= Cobb Center =

Cobb Center Mall
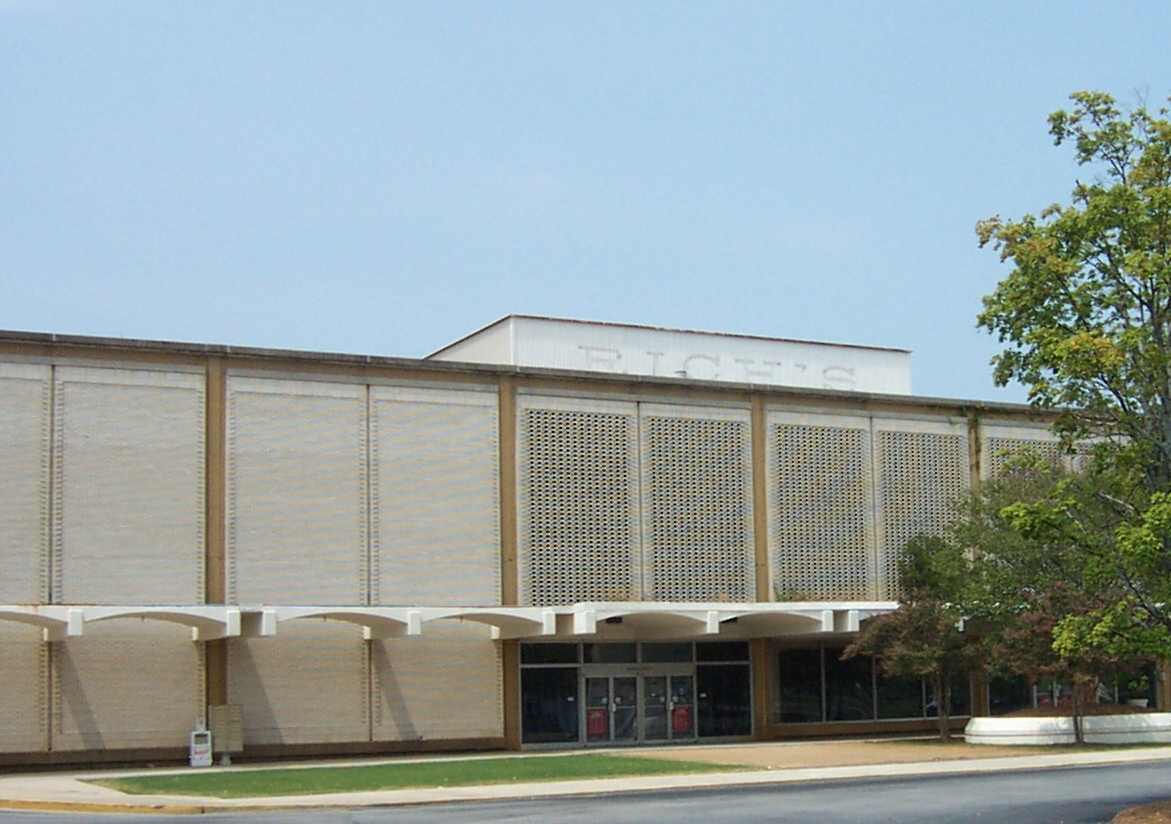
- Location: Smyrna, Georgia, United States
- Coordinates: 33°54′00″N 84°32′31″W
- Opened: August 15, 1963
- Closed: 1995
- Num. of anchor tenants: 2
- Floors: 1

Cobb Center Mall (originally Cobb County Shopping Center) was a shopping mall in Smyrna, Georgia, United States. It was the second mall built in Georgia, and opened on August 15, 1963.

== Early years ==
The mall was built in a post-World War II suburb of Atlanta by the parent company of Food Fair and featured nearly 50 stores including a Rich's department store (the fourth in the chain), Woolworths, Dunaway Drug (later Eckerd), Davis House restaurant (later Davis Brothers Cafeteria) and a Colonial supermarket. A six-screen movie theater, which later became King's Cinemas, was also opened on an outlot on the north side of the center. The mall was also originally an open-air center with covered walkways and the stores wrapped around the south and west side of the Rich's store, all facing it.

For the first ten years, the mall was successful and the two-story Rich's store was quickly expanded with a one-story north wing that greatly increased the total floor space. The mall was a major blow to downtown Marietta, Georgia to the north. When the mall first opened, nearly all of the major clothing stores in downtown Marietta also had branches at Cobb Center. It began to draw out its tenants, leaving the downtown mostly dead by the 1970s.

== Enclosing Cobb Center ==
Ten years after the mall opened, Cobb Center struggled after the opening of Cumberland Mall, a mall far superior in size and quantity stores compared to the much smaller open-air mall. Cumberland Mall opened in 1973 and featured all of the major Atlanta anchors including Rich's, Davison's, Sears and JCPenney. Cobb Center just had Rich's. The owners of Cobb Center in reaction to the new mall, fully enclosed the structure and added a new anchor, Grant City on the northwest corner of the mall.

=== Survival ===
The changes worked and the mall survived. There were two major factors to the success. The first was that Cumberland was the only nearby competition. Second, the Rich's at Cobb Center remained extremely popular. Rich's was enormously successful in the 1970s and this was one of only two locations that existed on the northwest side of Atlanta at the time. When Grant City closed in 1976, a small low-end chain with a store downtown named Kessler's took over the location.

== Downturn, renovation, and closure ==
Eventually, the mall was unable to continue to survive. The first blow came when Town Center Mall in Kennesaw, Georgia opened in 1986 in what had been a farming area. The mall also included Rich's. Town Center Mall was also much larger than Cumberland and was more convenient to the northern suburbs. The second blow was that the area around the mall was declining very sharply. The shopping base dwindled and so did the mall traffic. By then, Cobb Center looked very dated and small with its dark wood interior and very 1960s retro exterior.

Once again, in 1987, the mall was renovated for its 25th anniversary. This time, it was redesigned to the popular bright pastel look of the 1980s, skylights were improved and the mall was renamed "Four Seasons Mall" to attempt to remove the stigma of the mall that had been fading slowly for over a decade. As a short-term boost for the center, Howard's Restaurant, which had been a small bar and grill located across the street, located in the former Davis Brothers bringing business back to the center. Unfortunately, this renovation did not lead to expansion and many parts of the mall remained vacant, including the former Colonial/Big Star grocery store on the southwest corner, which closed at the mall somewhere in that period.

In the late 1980s, the mall continued to operate with many vacancies and no customers. What kept the mall alive was the Rich's and Kessler's, both which looked little different from the days they opened. With the upscale shoppers avoiding the center, Rich's was downscaled to a clearance store by the early 1990s and Kessler's closed in 1990 with no replacement. Howard's moved to a new location, and all that remained for tenants was a few stores including Woolworth's, Eckerd Drugs in the former Dunaway Drugs and Friedman's Jewelry. One of the wings to the mall had burned and was closed off as well. The mall was finally demolished in 1995 except for the Rich's, which lingered until it closed in February 2004.

== Cobb Center redevelopment ==
The former Rich's entrances to the mall were sealed except for the front entrance and a strip mall was attached to both sides of the Rich's store. The back parking lot of the mall was converted into a soccer park and the Rich's continued to operate there until it closed. The center was also renamed back to simply Cobb Center.

In December 2008, the Smyrna city council unanimously approved a rezoning which would allow for Imagine International Academy to move its school into the two-story part of the Rich's building, covering 120,000 square feet (11,000 m^{2}) of floor space. The classic façade will be destroyed and it will be made to look like a "modern school", to open in August for the 2009-2010 school year. Imagine International Academy opened for business as of 2010.

== Gallery ==
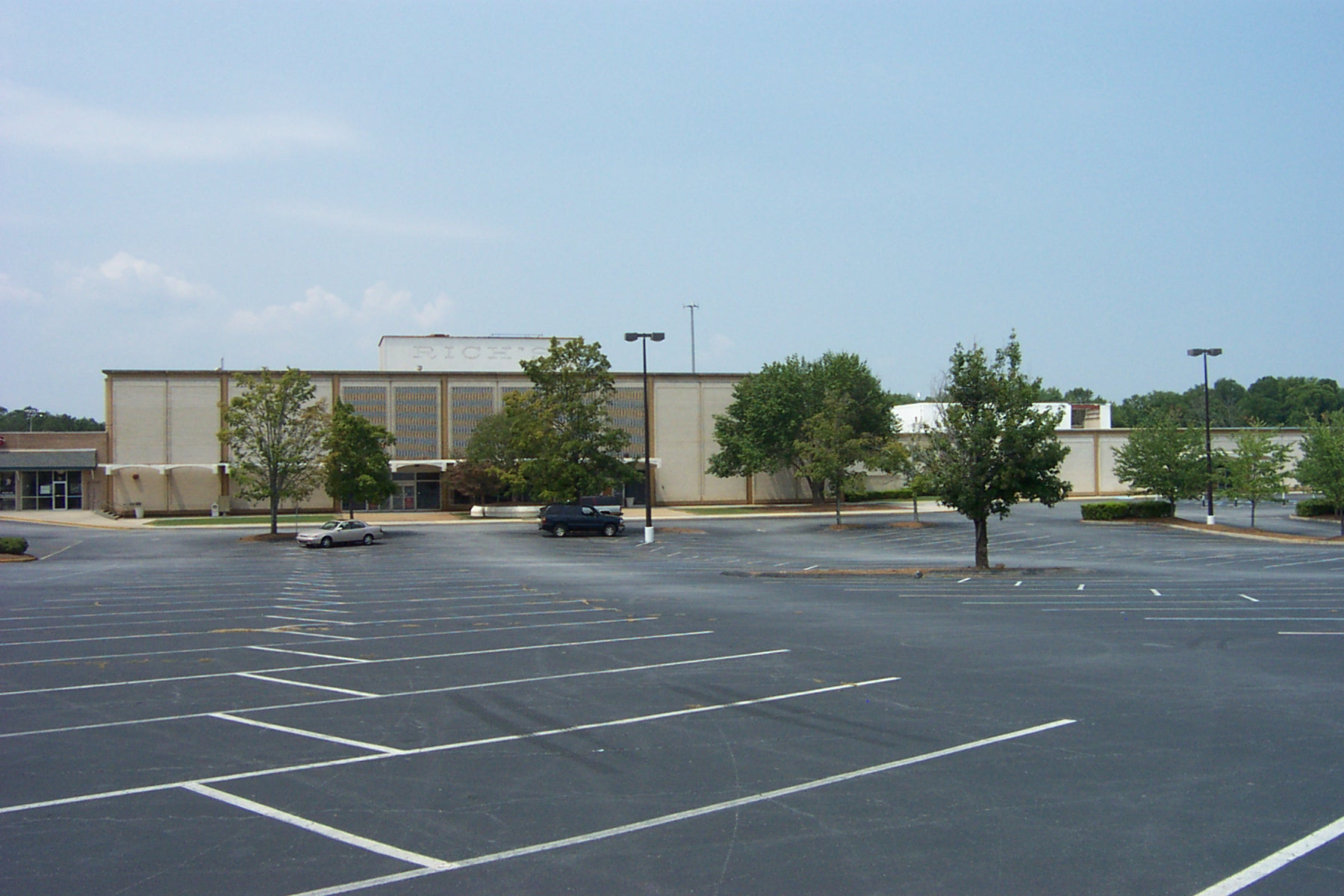
Front parking lot of former Rich's is now Imagine International Academy of Smyrna as of 2010. at Cobb Center Shopping center.

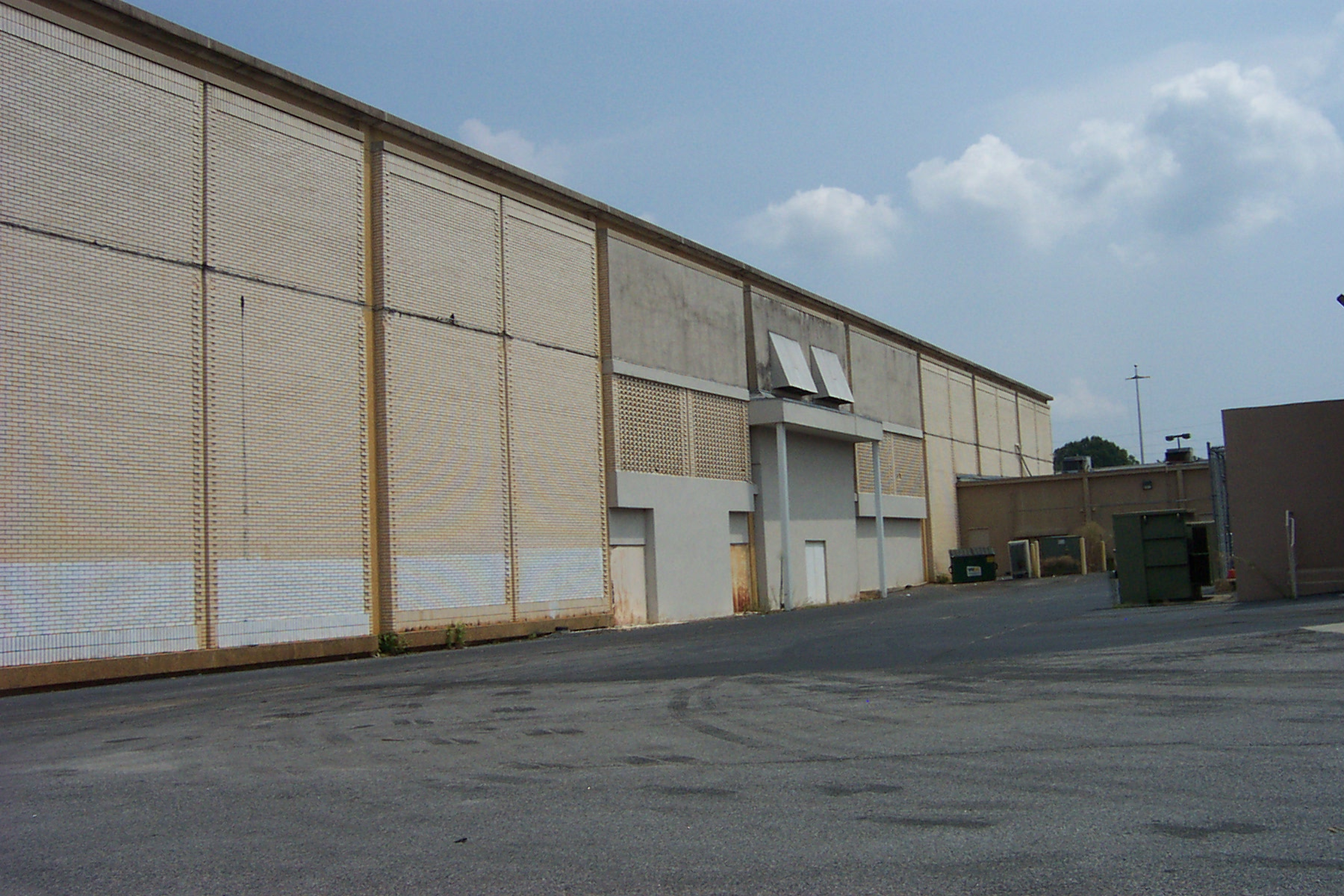
Former mall entrance to Rich's is now Imagine International Academy of Smyrna as of 2010. Note former roof line along brick.

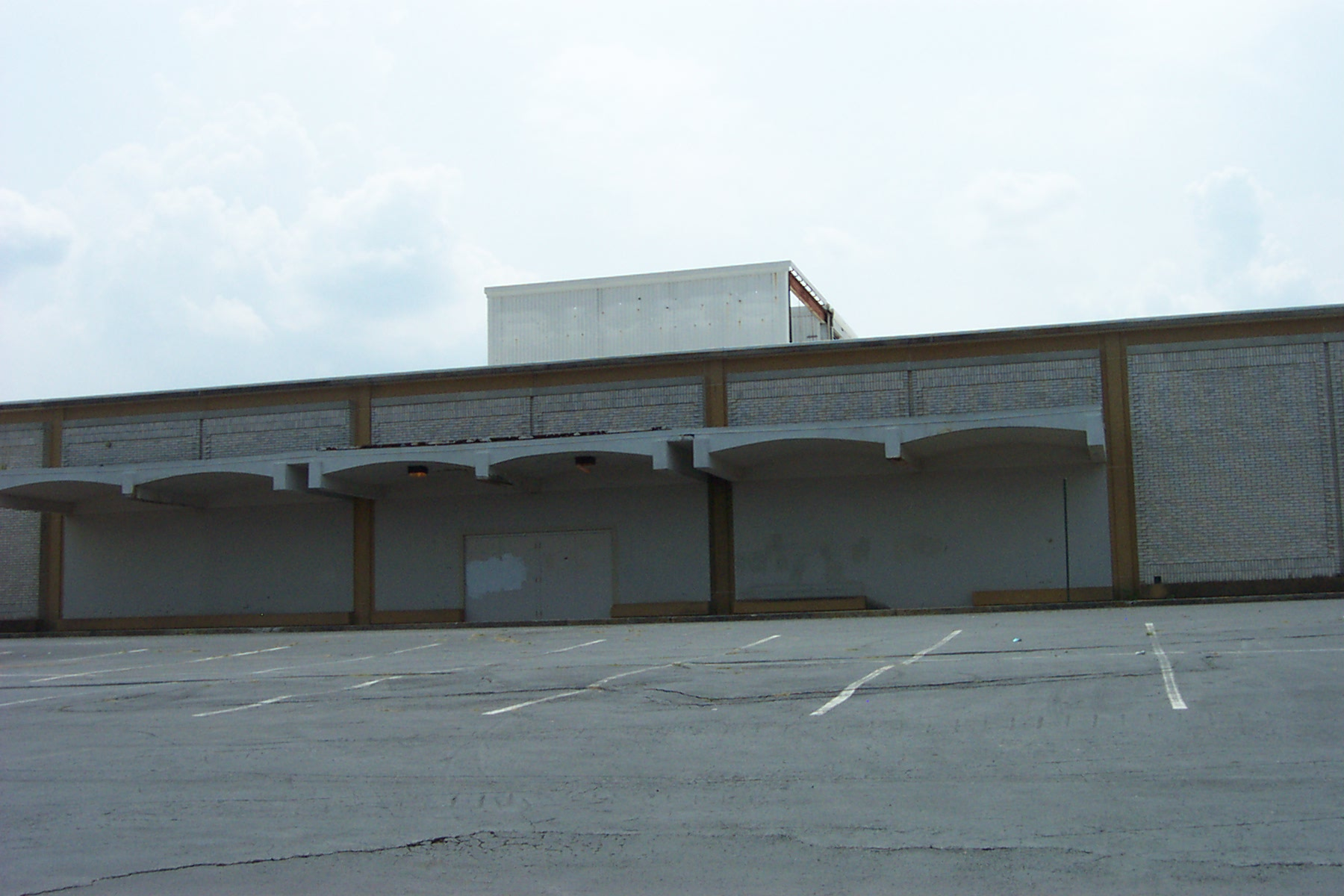
North entrance to Rich's is now Imagine International Academy of Smyrna as of 2010. One story expansion.
