= Cobb Galleria =

Office park in Cobb County, Georgia

Coordinates: 33.884160°N 84.466277°W

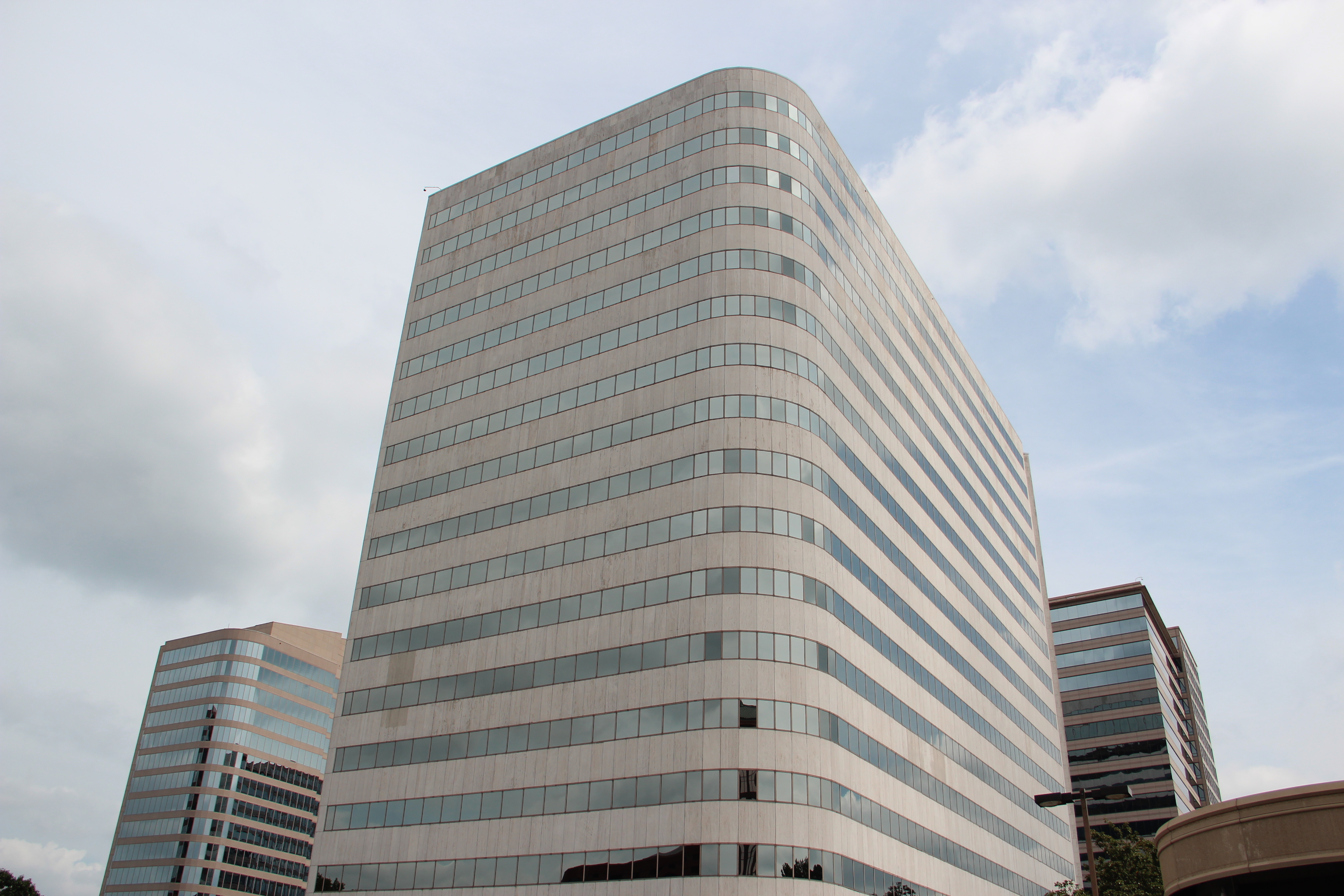
Office buildings in the Cobb Galleria

Cobb Galleria is a large office park with six skyscrapers located in the Cumberland/Vinings district of Cobb County in the U.S. state of Georgia. Its location is sandwiched between Marietta, Smyrna, Sandy Springs and the City of Atlanta. It is near many hotels and parks, the Cumberland Mall (accessible by a pedestrian bridge), the Cobb Galleria Centre, the Cobb Energy Performing Arts Center and the intersections of Interstate 75 and Interstate 285. It also adjoins other large business and residential districts, including the Vinings Overlook and Circle 75.
