= Town Center at Cobb =

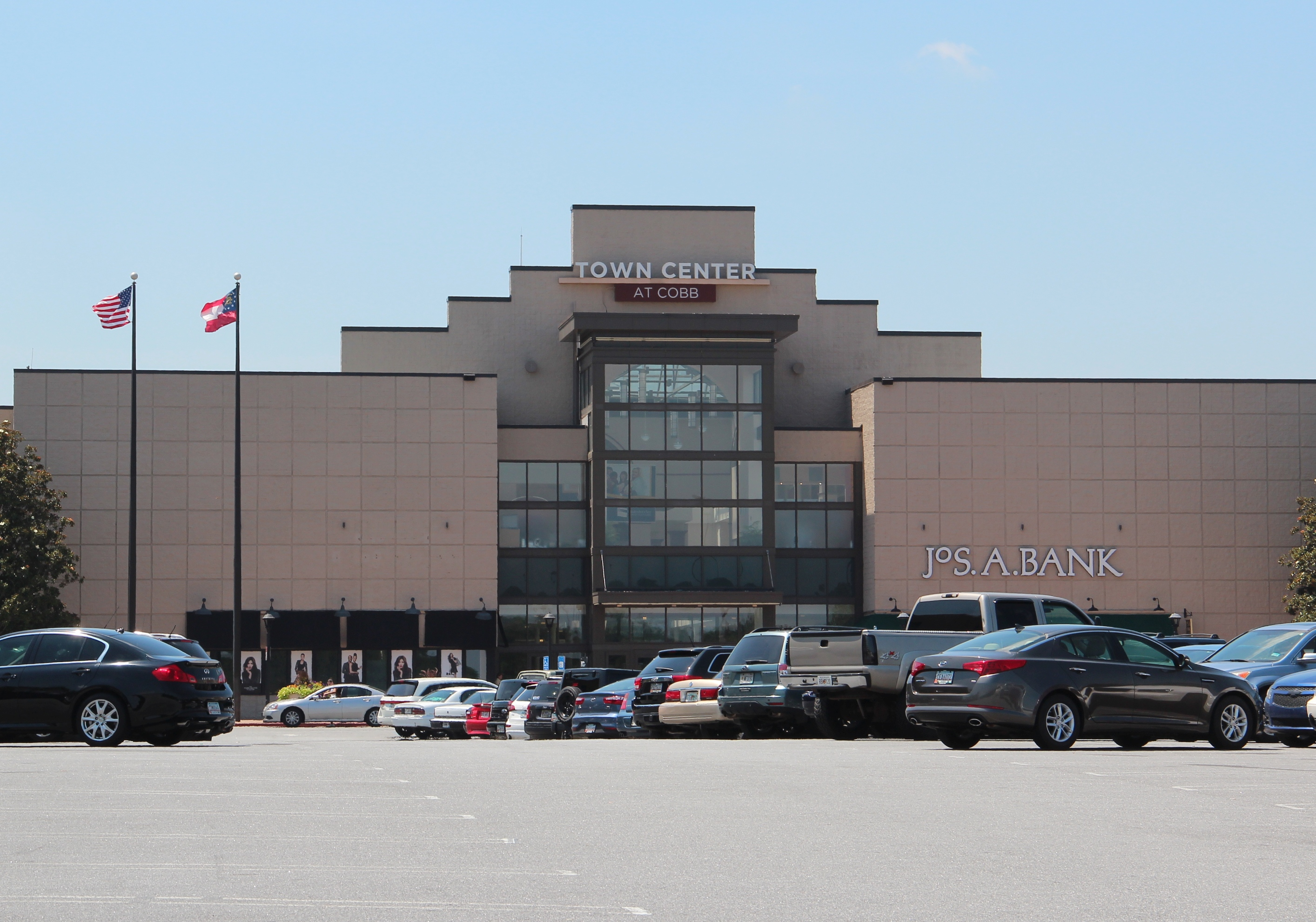
- Location: Cobb County, Georgia, U.S.
- Coordinates: 34.016846°N 84.564029°W
- Opened: February 28, 1986; 40 years ago
- Developer: Cadillac Fairview
- Manager: JLL Properties
- Owner: Jones Lang LaSalle
- Num. of stores: 144
- Num. of anchor tenants: 5 (3 open, 2 vacant)
- Floor area: 1,282,000 sq ft (119,100 m^{2})
- Floors: 2 (3 in Macy's Men and Furniture Gallery)
- Website: towncenteratcobb.com

Town Center at Cobb (often called Town Center Mall), is a super-regional shopping mall located in Kennesaw, Georgia, north of Atlanta. The anchor stores are two Macy's stores, and a JCPenney. There are two vacant anchor stores that were once Sears and Belk.

== History ==
Opened in late February 1986, the mall was originally anchored by Rich's, Macy's and Sears. The Mall was almost identical to Gwinnett Place Mall. The Macy's store was the first in Atlanta not to have originally been part of the Atlanta-based Davison's chain, which became Macy's during its opening. The largest mall in the state when it opened, a fourth anchor, Mervyn's, joined the mall later in 1986. Mervyn's also opened at Gwinnett Place Mall.

Town Center is part of a major retail hub in northern Cobb County along Barrett Parkway. It is located between parallel parts of I-75 and I-575, just north of the interstates' junction. The mall itself has seen significant changes over the years. In 1992, a new wing extending north from the east wing was finally added with Atlanta's first Birmingham-based Parisian. Parisian also opened at Phipps Plaza in 1992, Gwinnett Place Mall in 1993, and Northlake Mall in 1994. This brought the mall's store count up to 220 stores and number of anchor stores to five. At the time, no other mall in the state had five anchors except for North Point Mall, which opened in 1993.

Drawing away customers from the older Cumberland and Cobb Center Malls, the mall was first renovated in 1995 but never expanded aside from the Parisian addition. Store consolidations and retractions have varied the anchor line-up in recent years. First, in 1997, JCPenney took over the former location of Mervyn's, which pulled out of Georgia and Florida. Secondly, Rich's and Macy's merged, prompting the closure of the three-story Macy's which was an original anchor. Part of the Macy*s was refurbished and was used as a Macy's Furniture Gallery (originally a Rich's-Macy's Furniture Gallery) and now operates as Macy's Furniture Gallery, Macy's Furniture Clearance Center and Macy's Men's Store. Macy's now occupies the former Rich's location.

Occupancy rates remain high at the mall, though most major chain specialty stores are found in the mall. However, the mall is facing competition from all the big box stores on Barrett Parkway, including two "lifestyle centers" opened on each end of the county and more upscale malls such as Phipps Plaza and Lenox Square. On May 13, 2008, the mall announced a year-long renovation project. At that time, the property gained new, higher-end stores including Coach, Charlotte Russe, Swarovski and H&M. The project was finished in May 2009 along with a new food court design, family restrooms, children's play area, signage, and soft seating areas.

On February 7, 2017, Macy's announced Macy's Backstage will be opening inside Macy's in Spring 2017.

On May 29, 2020, it was announced Sears would be closing as part of a chainwide downsizing to close 28 stores nationwide. The store closed on August 9, 2020. There are now no more Sears locations in Georgia.

Deutsche Bank was the lead lender and trustee for a $200 million loan granted the mall in 2012. On February 2, 2021, the mall was put up for public auction on the Cobb County courthouse steps with an opening bid of $130,400,000. There were no offers tendered and the mall was foreclosed on.

The mall was purchased in 2023 by Kohan Retail Investments, a company known for buying struggling malls.

On January 24, 2025 it was announced that the Belk anchor store would close in February 18, 2025. That will leave just JCPenney’s and Macy’s after that.

On January 28, 2025 a notice appeared on all mall entrances from the property's owner, Kohan Retail Investments, stating the mall will be closed until further notice due to "unforeseen circumstances." It was later reported Georgia Power, the property's electrical service provider, had disconnected service to the property due to their "highly delinquent" bills. A Georgia Power spokesperson said, "We provided advance notice regarding this disconnection to mall management, as well as tenants, by delivering letters in person and placing signage onsite. We also made key community leaders aware." The mall reopened for business the following day.

In March 2025, just shy of 2 months after the temporary closure due to unpaid electric bills, property owner Kohan Retail Investments settled a $1 Million dollar outstanding property taxes case with Cobb County, Georgia to prevent the foreclosure and auctioning of the property.

== Anchors ==
=== Current anchors ===
- JCPenney (1997–present)
- Macy's (2 locations) (2005–present)

=== Former anchors ===
- Macy's (original location) (1986-2003)
- Mervyn's (1986-1997)
- Parisian (1992-2007)
- Rich's (1986-2005)
- Sears (1986-2020)
- Belk (2007-2025)
