= Macy's Great Tree =

Public Christmas tree in Atlanta, Georgia, United States

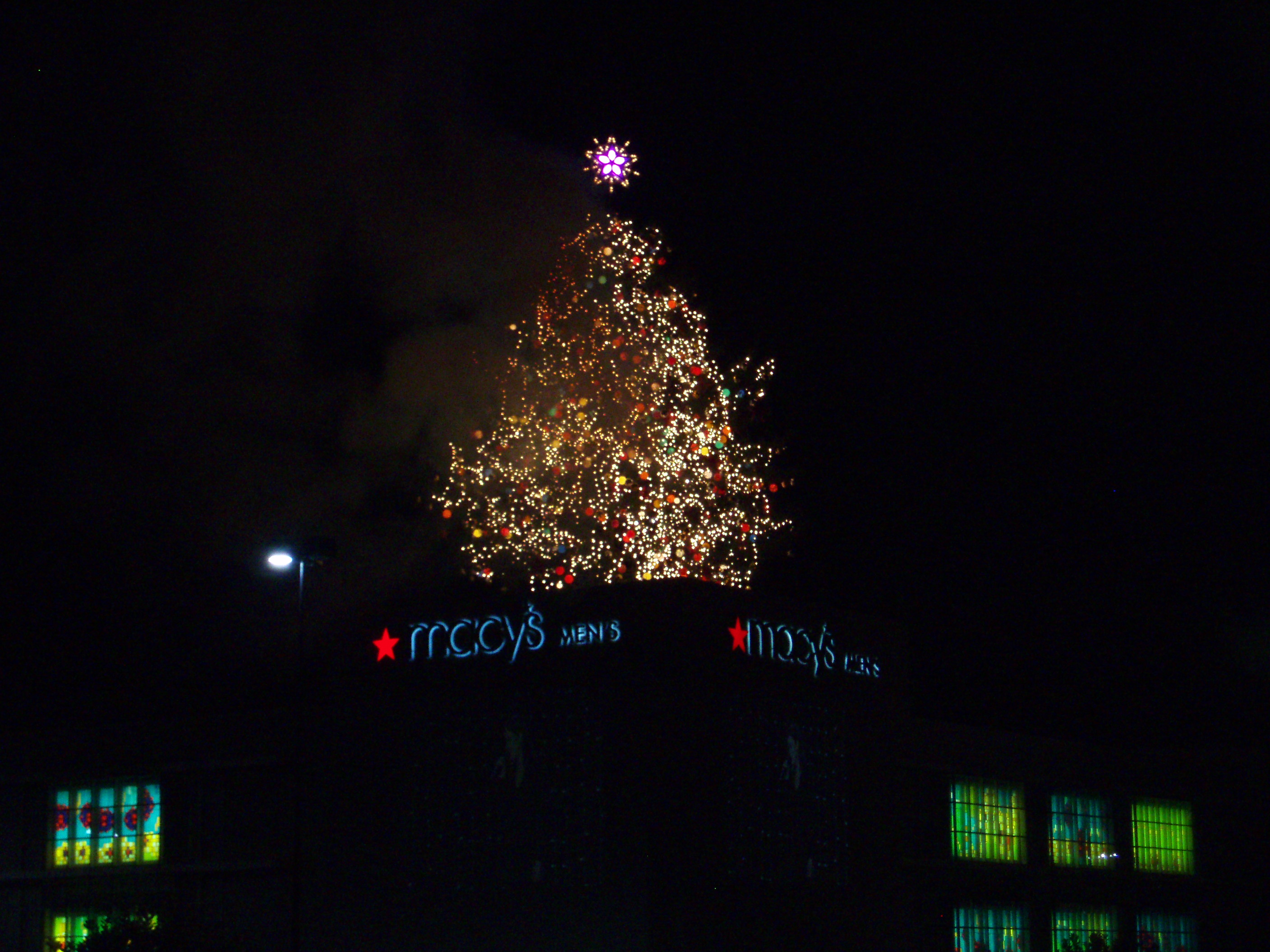
- The Christmas tree in 2010
- Status: Ended (2023)
- Frequency: Annually
- Venue: Lenox Square
- Locations: Atlanta, Georgia
- Coordinates: 33.84591°N 84.36187°W
- Country: United States
- Inaugurated: 1948; 78 years ago
- Founder: Rich's Department Store
- Most recent: 2022; 4 years ago

The Macy's Great Tree (previously the Rich's Great Tree and briefly the Great Tree at Macy's) was a large 70–90-foot (21–27 m) tall cut pine Christmas tree displayed by Rich's (and later Macy's) that was an Atlanta tradition since its start in 1948. The last time the tree was put up was in 2022.

In 2013, the tree was replaced by a much smaller artificial one in the parking lot, which was then moved back to the roof for 2014.

== History ==
Beginning in 1948, the Rich's department store put a large pine tree atop its flagship downtown Atlanta store, lighting it on Thanksgiving night. The idea was conceived by head of advertising Frank Pallotta. Later, the tree was perched atop the four-story "Crystal Bridge" that connected the original Rich's department store with a new building addition on the opposite side of Forsyth Street. With the tree on the roof of the complex, combined with its tall height, the Great Tree could be seen for tens of miles outside the downtown district of Atlanta. It was visible for decades, until Rich's downtown store closed in mid-1991 and the tree was moved to a smaller, less-imposing spot in Underground Atlanta. From there it was later moved to Lenox Square mall, but neither location provided as spectacular a view of the tree as when it stood on the Crystal Bridge.

As the tree became an Atlanta tradition, more was added to the display to create an attraction in its own right. This included Santa's Workshop, complete with reindeer on loan from the Stone Mountain Park Petting Zoo that parents and children would walk through on the way to visit with Santa Claus. Also, inside the store, was "Santa's Secret Shop". Off-limits to the adults, children entered an enclosed mini shopping area. All of this "spirit of Christmas" started at the street level with animated window displays such as angels playing violins in the windows.

The Rich's department store chain was sold to Federated Department Stores in 1975. After years of contraction, Federated closed Rich's main downtown store in the 1990s and moved the tree to nearby Underground Atlanta. In 2000, the tree was relocated once again to the rooftop of Rich's Lenox Square mall store, in the Buckhead (uptown) community, located north of the downtown and the midtown districts. Federated began a merger of the R.H. Macy's department stores with Rich's in the early 2000s, with the remaining Rich's stores being renamed Rich's-Macy's. On January 1, 2006, the Rich's name was dropped altogether in favor of the nationally known Macy's moniker. The 2005 holiday season was known as the last year of "Rich's Great Tree", even though the tradition continued as "The Great Tree at Macy's" (after two years as the Rich's-Macy's Great Tree).

After two years of incidents involving the tree (the 2011 tree snapped upon installation, and the crane removing the 2012 tree collapsed, causing damage to the store), Macy's announced in November 2013 that the Great Tree would be replaced with a smaller artificial tree and placed in the corner of the mall parking lot, officially ending 65 years of Atlanta tradition. Atlantans can expect the new tree to grow higher with years, as Macy's is planning to keep adding tree footage with the years to come as its budget allows, since they can acquire three-foot (nearly one-meter) sections locally from the Alpharetta-based manufacturer.

2020 brought changes caused by the COVID-19 pandemic: officials had set up the tree behind closed doors.

In December 2023 Macy's announced they ended the yearly tradition of the tree lighting.

In May 2025 it was announced that the annual tradition will move to Piedmont Park starting with the 2025 season. The tree will be visible from the Atlanta Beltline and will be known as 'Light up the Season'. The inaugural tree lightning will be held on November 23, 2025 .

== The original tree ==
Each year through 2012, the tree itself was an eastern white pine, usually around 65–75 feet (20–23 m) tall, and contained several miles of electrical wiring, thousands of stringed lights, hundreds of basketball-sized ornaments and mirror balls, and dozens of strobe lights for effect. It also had a huge lighted tree topper seven feet (two meters) in diameter, previously a snowflake, and now a color-changing LED star since becoming Macy's. For 2009, it also had 125 snowflake ornaments and 125 metallic red Macy's stars, similar to the décor used inside its stores for the Christmas shopping season. It required hundreds of gallons of water (well over a thousand liters) each day (depending on the weather and humidity), along with bottles of aspirin to keep the tree fresh (though it is unclear how effective aspirin actually is). It was secured so as to withstand wind gusts of up to 90 miles per hour (140 km/h).

The tree was selected over a year before it was actually intended to be cut and used, so that it could be used as the backup should something happen to the tree that was previously selected. It was generally picked from somewhere in north Georgia. The 2009 tree was planted in late 1983 after being used indoors as a family's first Christmas tree.

== The Pink Pig ==
The Pink Pig was an amusement park ride of sorts that was a miniature suspended monorail sized for children. Adults would be hard-pressed to fit inside the enclosed cars that the children sat in as the ride operated. The original ride "flew" from the ceiling of the toy department. The pig was then moved outside the building to a rooftop Christmas village that surrounded the Great Tree. The Pink Pig started outside under the tree, returned indoors to fly over the toy department before returning to its starting point. The original Pink Pig was named Priscilla. A second pig, named Percival was later added to meet the high demand to ride the pig. After completing their journey, riders received a sticker that said "I rode the Pink Pig".

The ride moved to the Festival of Trees event in the 1990s, and resided at the Atlanta History Center. The ride was brought back to Rich's in 2004 when it reappeared at the Rich's at Lenox Square mall, the new location for the Great Tree. The new version of the Pink Pig was a conventional Zamperla Rio Grande storyline train ride with a miniature pink pig locomotive pulling a set of pink child-sized passenger cars at ground level, instead of the original suspended monorail design. It had been speculated that the original monorail was retired because it could not be maintained as a viable and safe children's ride.

The ride went on hiatus in 2020 due to the COVID-19 pandemic, and in 2021 Macy's announced the ride was being retired.

== Fame of the Great Tree ==
The tree and the bridge were featured on the cover of Time magazine on the week of December 15, 1961.

During the time the Great Tree was at the downtown Rich's store, it was undeniably the biggest Christmas-time attraction in the southeastern United States. Parents from around the South brought their children to downtown Atlanta expressly to experience this attraction and have their picture taken with the Rich's store Santa Claus. Millions of children and their parents made the annual migration during its tenure. The Pink Pig was an immensely popular attraction in its own right. Decades after the original Pink Pig was retired, many Atlanta natives who rode the pig as children fondly reminisce about their rides in the pig. The ride inspired the 2004 book I Rode the Pink Pig: Atlanta's Favorite Christmas Tradition (ISBN 1588180999). Today, much memorabilia can be found in the homes of Atlantans.

== The Lighting of the Great Tree ==
Through 2014, the grand illumination ceremony occurred on Thanksgiving night, no matter the weather. Since the 1980s, it has been regularly aired on television station WSB-TV, which now shows it in high definition. Christmas carols are sung by various music celebrities and local groups, and at least one is usually chimed by a bell choir. The tree is lit near the very end of the hour on the highest note of "O Holy Night" (during the line "O Night Divine"), and remains lit every night at least through New Year's Eve. Since at least 2012, a fireworks display immediately follows the lighting.

For years the ceremony had been held from 7:00 to 8:00 PM, but for 2013 it was moved an hour earlier due to the store opening. For 2014, it was moved another hour earlier, so that it was not yet even completely dark during the lighting, with local sunset occurring at 5:30pm. For 2015, the store will open even earlier, which would force the lighting into the afternoon. For this reason, the 67-year Thanksgiving tradition was abandoned, pushing the lighting to the Sunday before.

Originally, four choirs sang from the north face of the Crystal Bridge, which connected all but the lower two levels of the downtown Rich's over Forsyth Street. Each of the four floors of choirs, ordered from bottom to top, sang during the program. Faux stained glass panels (still used by Macy's) were put in the bridge's windows on either side (left and right) of each choir, giving the ceremony an almost church-like effect. Street lights were turned off in the area below so there was no glare for the thousands of spectators that gathered every year regardless of the weather. The host/storyteller of those earlier days was Bob van Camp of WSB Atlanta radio and television, and once the organist at the Fox Theatre.

The ceremony, in those days, was based on the reading of the traditional birth of Christ, i.e. the "Christmas Story", unlike today's more generic "holiday" themes and music.

Over the years the crowds grew. The venue expanded to include the south side of the bridge. Thus, four more choirs were added. Although heard by everyone, the ceremony of choirs alternated between the bridge facings. For the conclusion of the ceremony, all of the bridge choirs (of both musical eras) were lighted on every floor, and leading towards the soloist's highest note in "O Holy Night", at which point the lights on the great tree burst alive to shine on downtown Atlanta.

Before rock and roll became the predominant form of popular music in the 1970s, the Christmas carols were sung in a traditional, even classical manner, but in more modern times, nearly all of them have tended to be performed in a gospel music style, including "O Holy Night". In earlier years, for example, "O Holy Night" was performed by an operatic soprano, while in 2006, it was performed by LeAnn Rimes. The 2009 concert included country music singer Josh Turner and gospel singer Mandisa (who sang the keynote), and dance crew SoReal Cru using remixed versions of classic Christmas songs from Merry Mixmas and other albums.

Beginning in 2015 the lighting of Macy's Great Tree, that year the "68th edition of the Great Tree", was changed from Thanksgiving night to the Sunday before Thanksgiving, at 7:00PM This returned the ceremony to its traditional time, well after sunset at the western edge of the Eastern time zone. When asked specifically about the reason for the move from Thursday to Sunday, a Macy's spokesperson claimed "It's what our customers want." However, the apparent reason behind the move is so that Macy's could start their Black Friday sale even earlier on Thanksgiving. From 2015 through 2019, the ceremony was held on the Sunday before Thanksgiving. In 2020, it was again moved, to the Thursday a week before Thanksgiving. The 2020 ceremony was restricted to a small invitation-only private event, due to COVID. The 2021 ceremony was also private, by invitation only. The 75th ceremony will take place Thursday, November 17, 2022.

== Other history ==
=== Transition from Rich's to Macy's ===
After an announcement was made in 2004, Rich's stores became Rich's-Macy's in early 2005, and for Christmas that year and the next, the Rich's Great Tree became the "Great Tree at Macy's". In 2007, the still-new name was dropped in favor of "Macy's Great Tree", after all Rich's stores became Macy's, eliminating the retailer after 140 years. The only visible reminders of Rich's are the Great Tree, and the façade of the original (1924) part of the Rich's building, now attached to the Sam Nunn Atlanta Federal Building via another four-story bridge where the Crystal Bridge was. (33.75309°N 84.39322°W)

=== Trees that snapped ===
In 2004, the tree from Snellville snapped about two-thirds of the way up while workers were attempting to use a crane to lift it from the ground to the roof. Since the tree was rather late in being set up to begin with (November 14 was only 11 days before Thanksgiving that year), a replacement tree (always selected in case of an emergency such as this) was being rushed in from nearby Lithia Springs. In 2003, it took eight workers three weeks to accomplish the massive decorating task. The tree also snapped in 1974, the year before Federated bought Rich's from the Rich family. In 2011, the tree from Douglasville cracked when being lifted off the flatbed truck, after being picked in the first contest to select the tree. Citing safety concerns, another tree from near the first was to be brought in, leaving barely over a week until Thanksgiving for the tree to be decorated.

=== Crane collapse ===
The day after New Year's Day 2013, the arm of the crane removing the tree buckled and collapsed, sending the trunk of the tree crashing partially through the roof and into the third-floor men's department. That portion of the store sustained extensive water damage due to broken fire sprinkler pipes. Nobody was injured, as it was being removed early in the morning, before the store opened. Workers had to cut the tree apart after removing lights and giant ornaments, which were still on the tree as it was being removed.

== See also ==
- General Grant Tree
- National Christmas Tree
- Rockefeller Center Christmas Tree
