= Cobb Convention Center-Atlanta =

Convention centre in Atlanta, Georgia, US

- Interactive map of Cobb Convention Center-Atlanta
- Former names: Cobb Galleria Centre (1994–2025)
- Location: 2 Galleria Parkway, Atlanta, GA 30339
- Coordinates: 33°53′00″N 84°27′59″W
- Owner: Cobb-Marietta Coliseum and Exhibit Hall Authority

Construction
- Opened: 1994

Website
- cobbgalleria.com

The Cobb Convention Center-Atlanta (formerly the Cobb Galleria Centre) is a meeting and convention center in the Cumberland/Galleria district of Cobb County, northwest of Atlanta, Georgia, in the United States. It is also located next to a cluster of mid-rise office buildings, Cumberland Mall, Truist Park, The Battery Atlanta and the Cobb Energy Performing Arts Centre. It has hosted over 20,000 events and 10 million guests. The venue operates under the direction of the Cobb-Marietta Coliseum and Exhibit Hall Authority and is located at the intersection of three major highways: Interstate 75, Interstate 285, and Cobb Parkway (U.S. 41) just northwest of the city.

The Galleria Specialty Shops, which pre-dated the convention center, was located downstairs, with meeting halls upstairs; the mall was permanently closed on May 31, 2025.

The center was renamed the Cobb Convention Center-Atlanta in October 2025.

== History ==
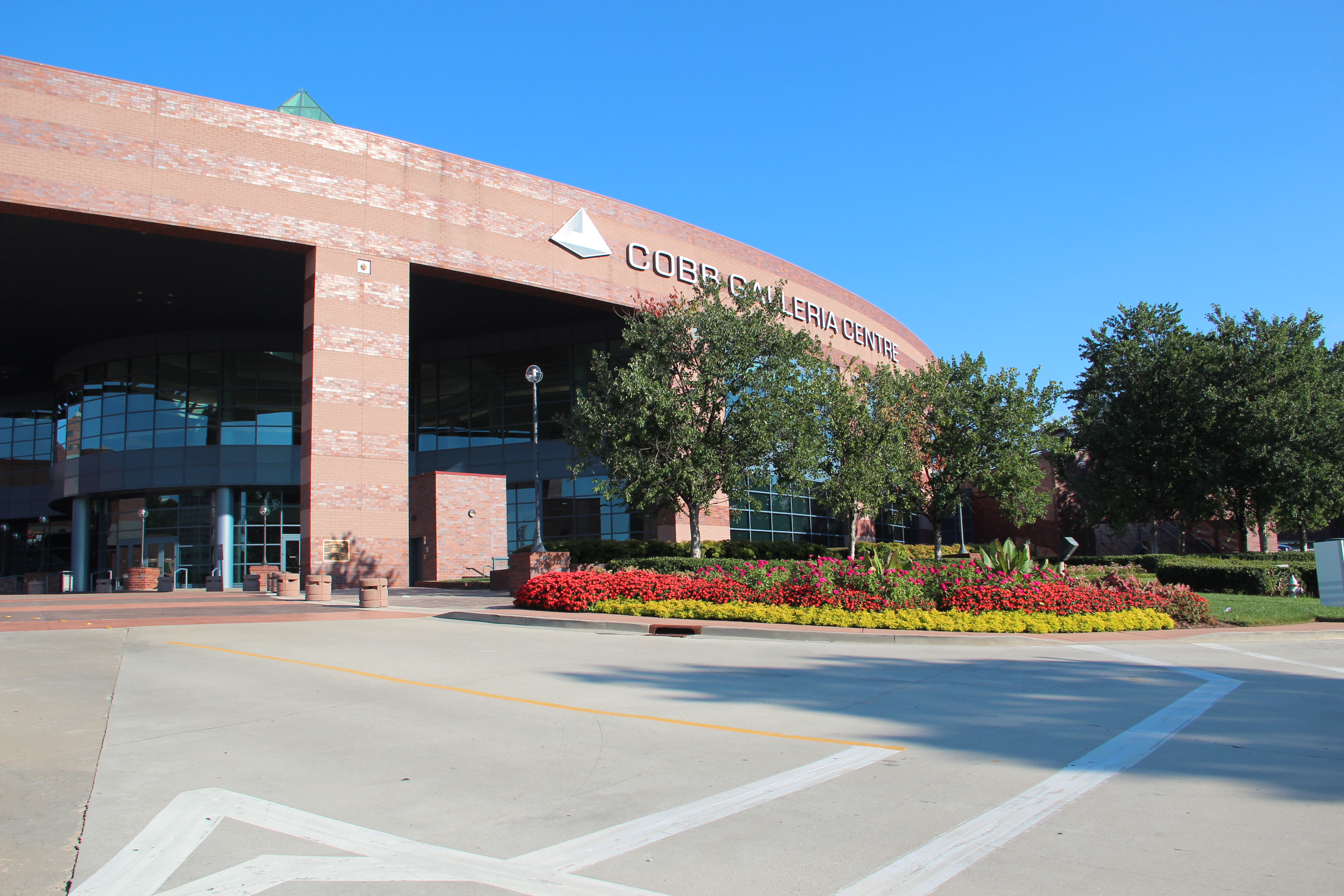
Cobb Galleria Centre, September 2016

Cobb Galleria Centre was constructed in 1994 by the Cobb-Marietta Coliseum and Exhibit Hall Authority to serve the need for a facility to accommodate small and mid-sized tradeshows, conventions, meetings and social events. With more than 320,000 total square feet, the facility features 144,000 square feet (13,400 m^{2}) of exhibit space, a 25,000-square-foot (2,300 m^{2}) ballroom, 20 meeting rooms and four executive boardrooms.

Located within the Galleria complex, an 88 acres (36 ha) upscale office/retail/hotel area, the Centre is connected to the Galleria Specialty Mall and the 522-room Renaissance Waverly Hotel. Accessible by a pedestrian sky bridge are the Sheraton Suites Galleria Hotel, Cumberland Mall, Truist Park and The Battery Atlanta.

The Authority has been able to re-invest in its asset through several acquisitions and construction initiatives, including building additional exhibit space and parking facilities, bringing food and beverage operations in-house and acquiring the Galleria Specialty Shops. The biggest initiative has been the construction of the state-of-the-art Cobb Energy Performing Arts Centre, which opened in 2007.

Stores include Murph's and Subway.

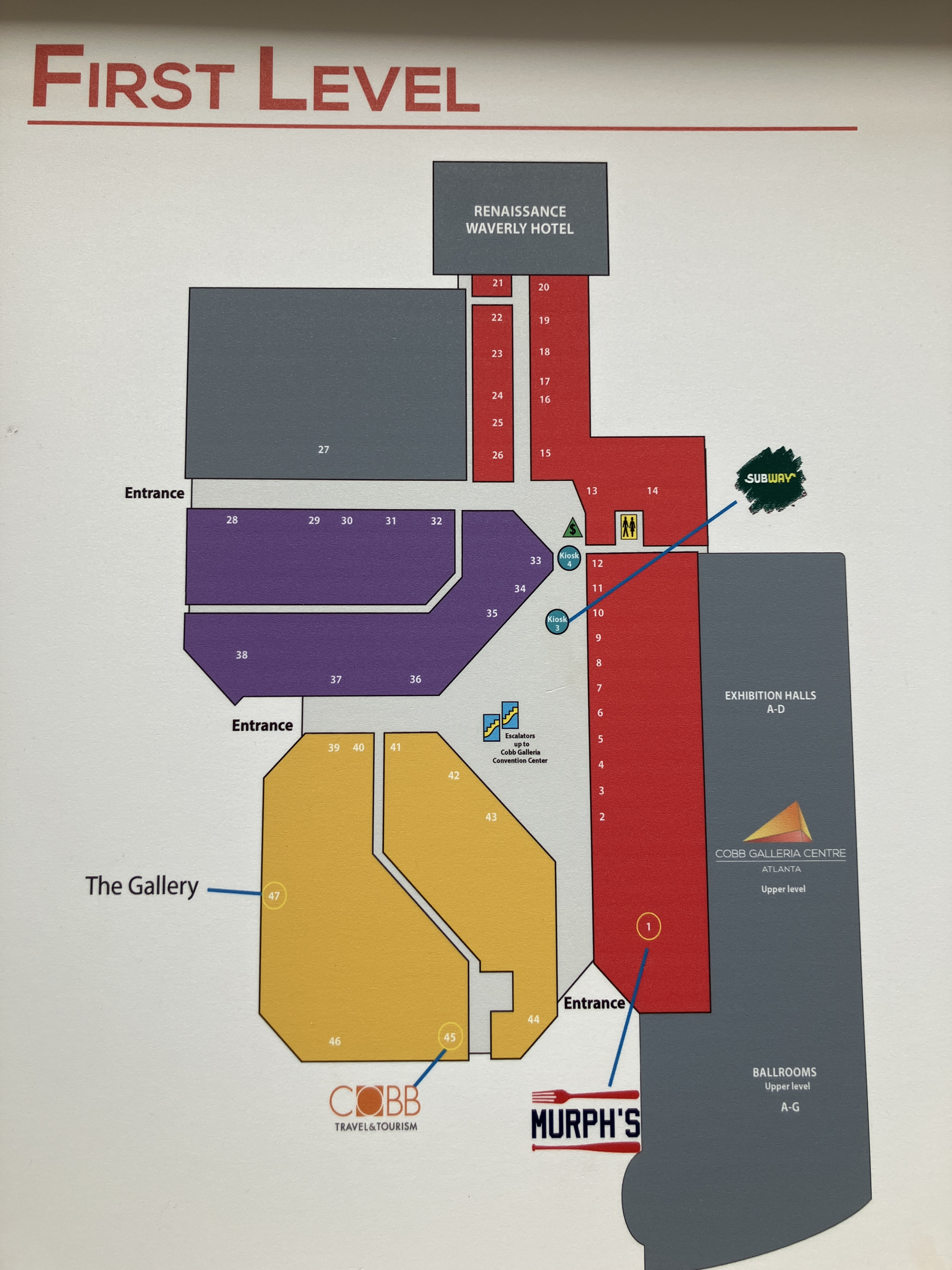
Map of the Cobb Galleria Centre.
