= Cumberland Mall (Georgia) =

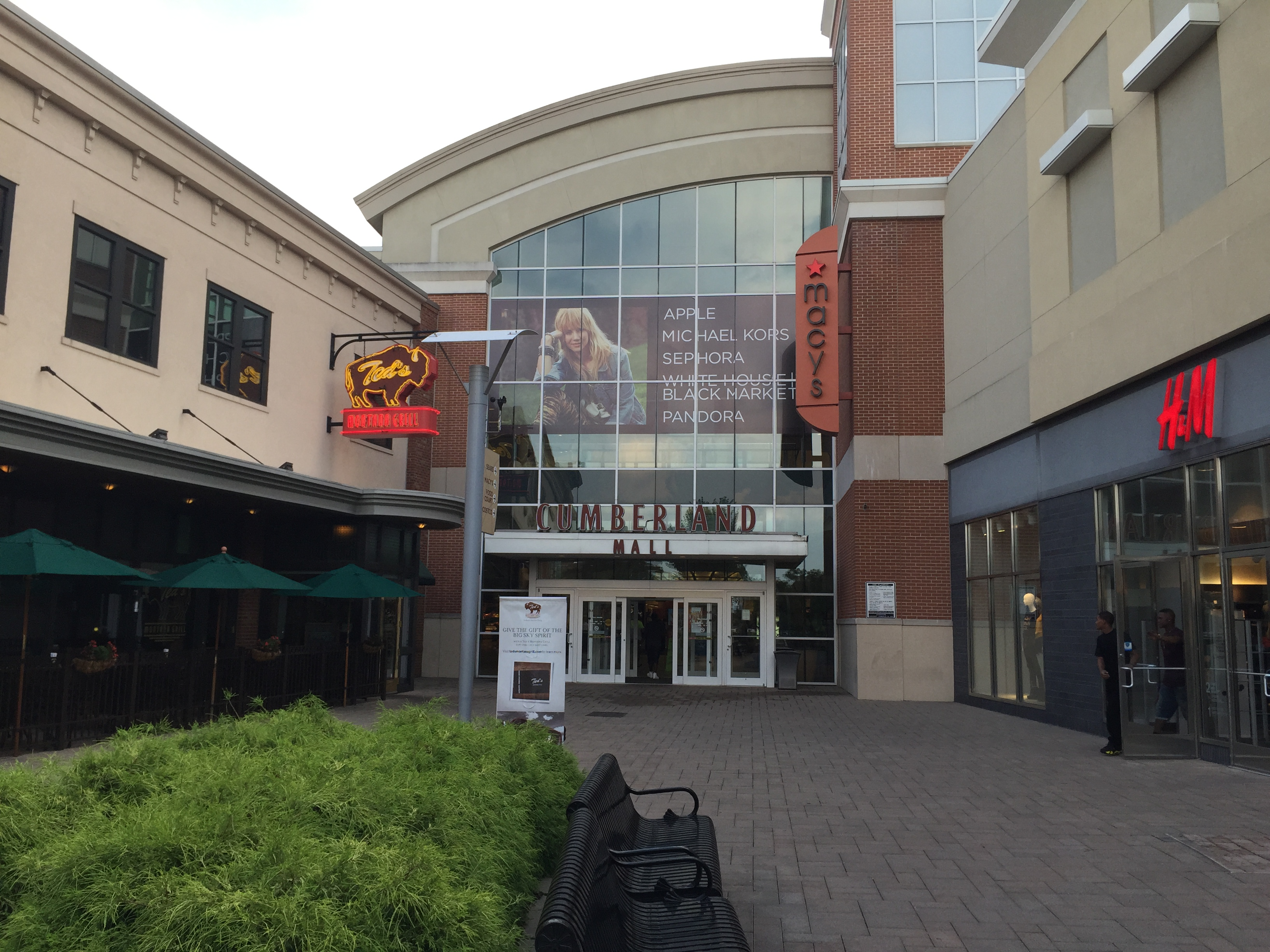
- Entrance to the mall in 2015
- Location: Cumberland, Georgia, United States
- Coordinates: 33°52′51″N 84°28′06″W
- Opened: August 8, 1973; 53 years ago
- Developer: Crow Carter Associates
- Manager: Ggp
- Owner: GGP (51%); CBRE Group (49%)
- Num. of stores: 134
- Num. of anchor tenants: 5
- Floor area: 1,040,000 sq ft (97,000 m^{2}).
- Floors: 2 (3 in Macy's)
- Parking: 5,600
- Public transit: Cumberland Transfer Center
- Website: www.cumberlandmall.com/en/

Cumberland Mall is a shopping mall in the Cumberland district of Metropolitan Atlanta near the suburbs of Smyrna and Vinings. It was the largest shopping mall in Georgia when it opened on August 8, 1973. The mall features the traditional retailers Macy's, Dick's Sporting Goods, Costco, in addition to Planet Fitness, and Round 1 Entertainment.

== History ==
Cumberland Mall in Atlanta was the first four-anchor mall built in Georgia, and only the second such mall in the entire Southeastern United States. It was developed by Crow Carter & Company. The original anchors to the mall were Rich's, Davison's, Sears and JCPenney.

Cumberland Mall remained one of the leading malls in the region for over a decade before Town Center Mall in Kennesaw opened in 1986. Cumberland Mall originally featured many distinct design elements to heighten the original mall experience, but as competition forced a major reshuffling of the mall, much of this was stripped away in the renovation of 1989. Some of the original tenants that were lost at this point were Magic Pan, McDonald's, Piccadilly Cafeteria and Cashin's Restaurant among others. The food court was added in a previous renovation, in late 1982 or early 1983.

In 2003, Cumberland Mall lost its first anchor, Rich's (formerly Davison's). The vacant store resulted in a major redevelopment plan. The redevelopment included the demolition of the old Rich's, which was replaced with a new mall entrance complete with an open-air wing. This mall has restaurants such as Buffalo Wild Wings, Maggiano's Little Italy, The Cheesecake Factory, P.F. Chang's China Bistro and Stoney River Legendary Steaks. Other changes included the demolition of the JCPenney, which planned to close its store, for the construction of a new Costco. The changes also included a complete interior renovation with new skylights and an expanded food court. These changes were planned to keep the mall competitive, even with only two traditional department stores remaining: Macy's (former Rich's) and Sears. All the renovations were completed in early 2007. In 2015, Sears Holdings spun off 235 of its properties, including the Sears at Cumberland Mall, into Seritage Growth Properties. On March 11, 2015, Tomorrow's News Today - Atlanta detailed Kroger's plans to take over the upper level of Sears and reopen it as a 93,000-square-foot grocery store by the summer of 2016.

On January 12, 2016, Kroger announced that it was no longer coming to Cumberland Mall after all.

On August 22, 2018, Sears announced that it would be closing in November 2018 as part of a plan to close 46 stores nationwide. After the store closed, Costco and Macy's are the remaining anchors left.

On June 8, 2020, Ted's Montana Grill closed due to COVID-19 financial restraints; shortly after, the only restaurants left after the closure of Ted's, include Buffalo Wild Wings, Maggiano's Little Italy, The Cheesecake Factory, P.F. Chang's Bistro, and Stoney River Legendary Steaks. In 2022, the space of the former Ted's Montana Grill is replaced with Canadian-based seafood restaurant The Captain's Boil.

On August 21, 2020, Dick's Sporting Goods and Golf Galaxy were added to the mall and replaced the upper level of the former Sears building, along with Planet Fitness, which opened on September 1, 2020.

The mall is connected to the Cobb Galleria Centre via a pedestrian walkway that bridges Cobb Parkway.

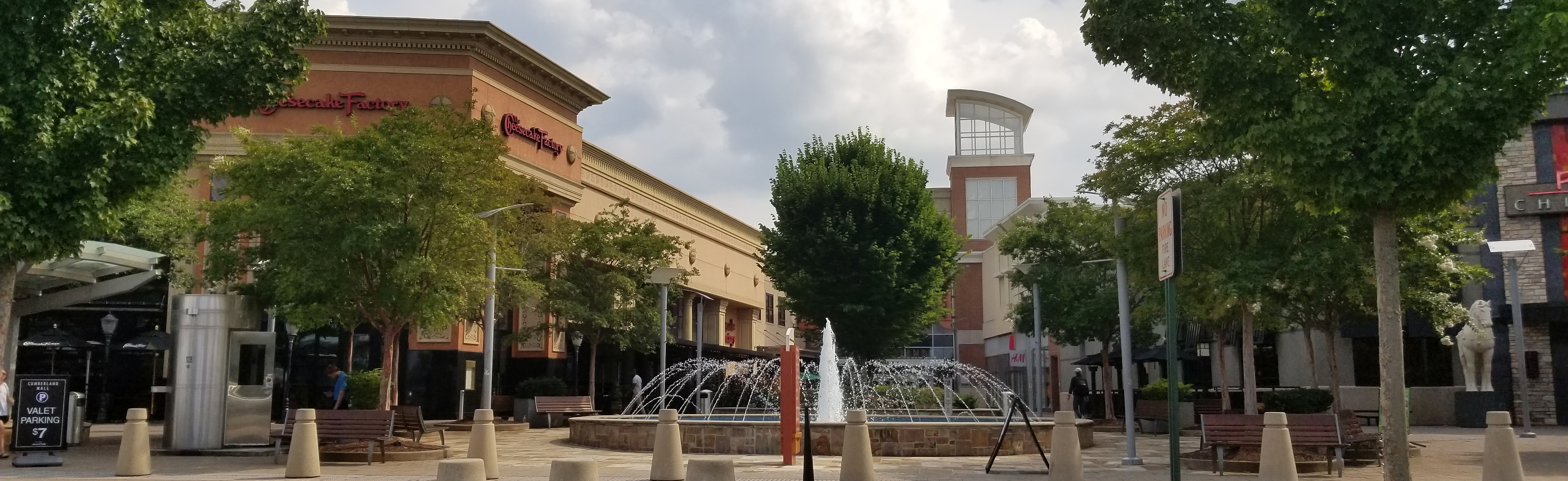
Cumberland Mall in 2018

=== Anchors ===
- Costco Wholesale (November 15, 2006 – present)
- Dick's Sporting Goods/Golf Galaxy (August 21, 2020 – present)
- Macy's (1986-2003, March 6, 2005-present)
- Planet Fitness (September 1, 2020 – present)
- Round One Entertainment (2021–present)

=== Former anchors ===
- Davison's (August 8, 1973 – 1986)
- JCPenney (August 8, 1973 – 2005)
- Rich's (August 8, 1973 – March 6, 2005)
- Sears (August 8, 1973 – November 25, 2018)

=== Cancelled anchors ===
- Kroger (2016)

== See also ==
- Cumberland (edge-city of Atlanta)
- Cobb Galleria
