= Cumberland, Georgia =

Unincorporated community in the Atlanta metropolitan area, Georgia, US

Cumberland
- Unincorporated area
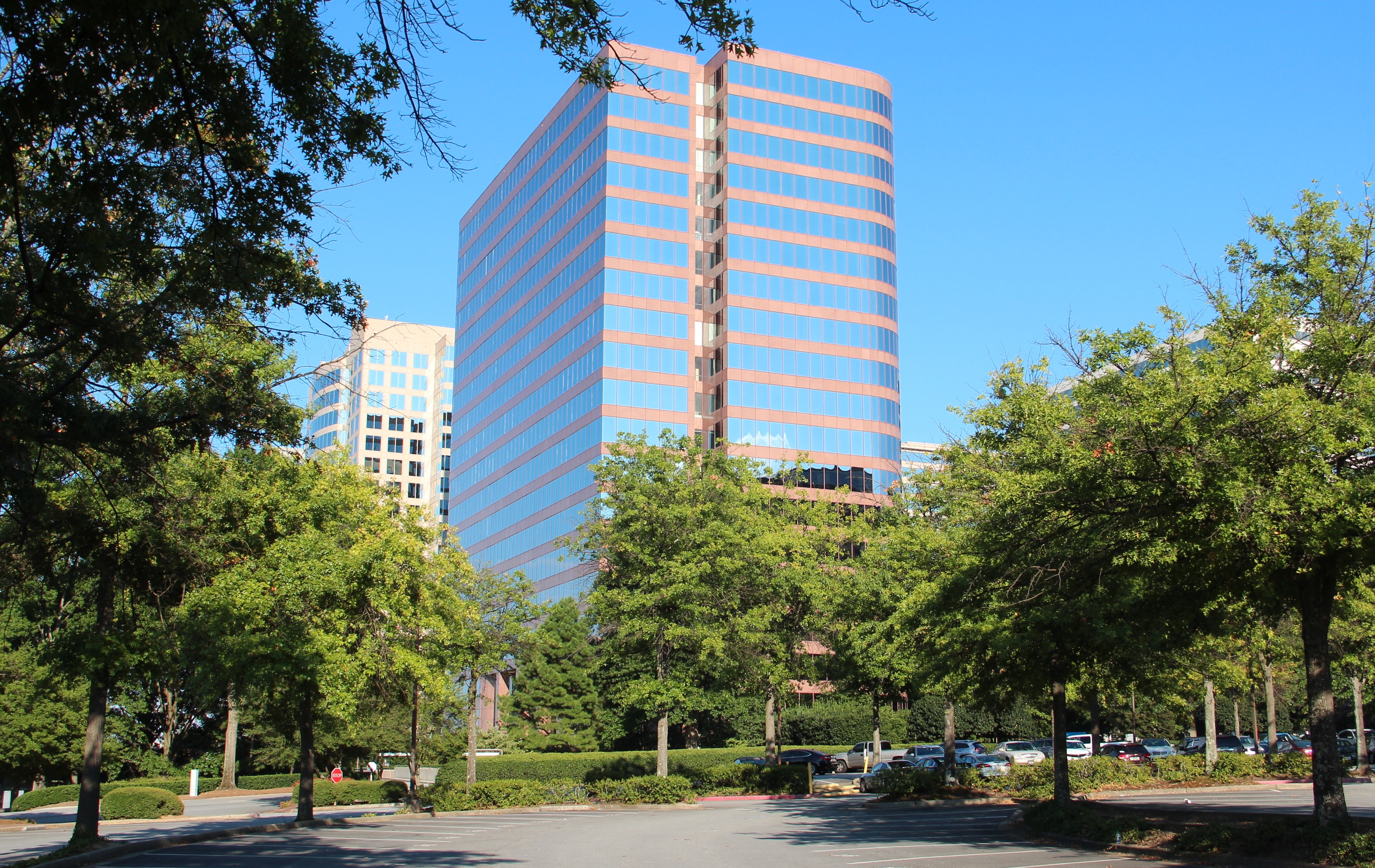
- Office buildings in Cumberland

- Location within Metro Atlanta
- Coordinates: 33.8761°N 84.4598°W
- Country: United States
- State: (Georgia (U.S. state)) Georgia
- County: Cobb
- Elevation: 738–1,050 ft (225–320 m)

Population (2007)
  - Total: 103,000 (approximately)
- Time zone: UTC-5 (EST)
  - Summer (DST): UTC-4 (EDT)
- Zip code: 30339

Cumberland is an edge city in Cobb County located in an unincorporated area of the northwest Atlanta metropolitan area, Georgia, United States. It is situated 10 miles (16 km) northwest of Downtown Atlanta. The Atlanta Braves of Major League Baseball (MLB) play their games at Truist Park in Cumberland.

== History ==
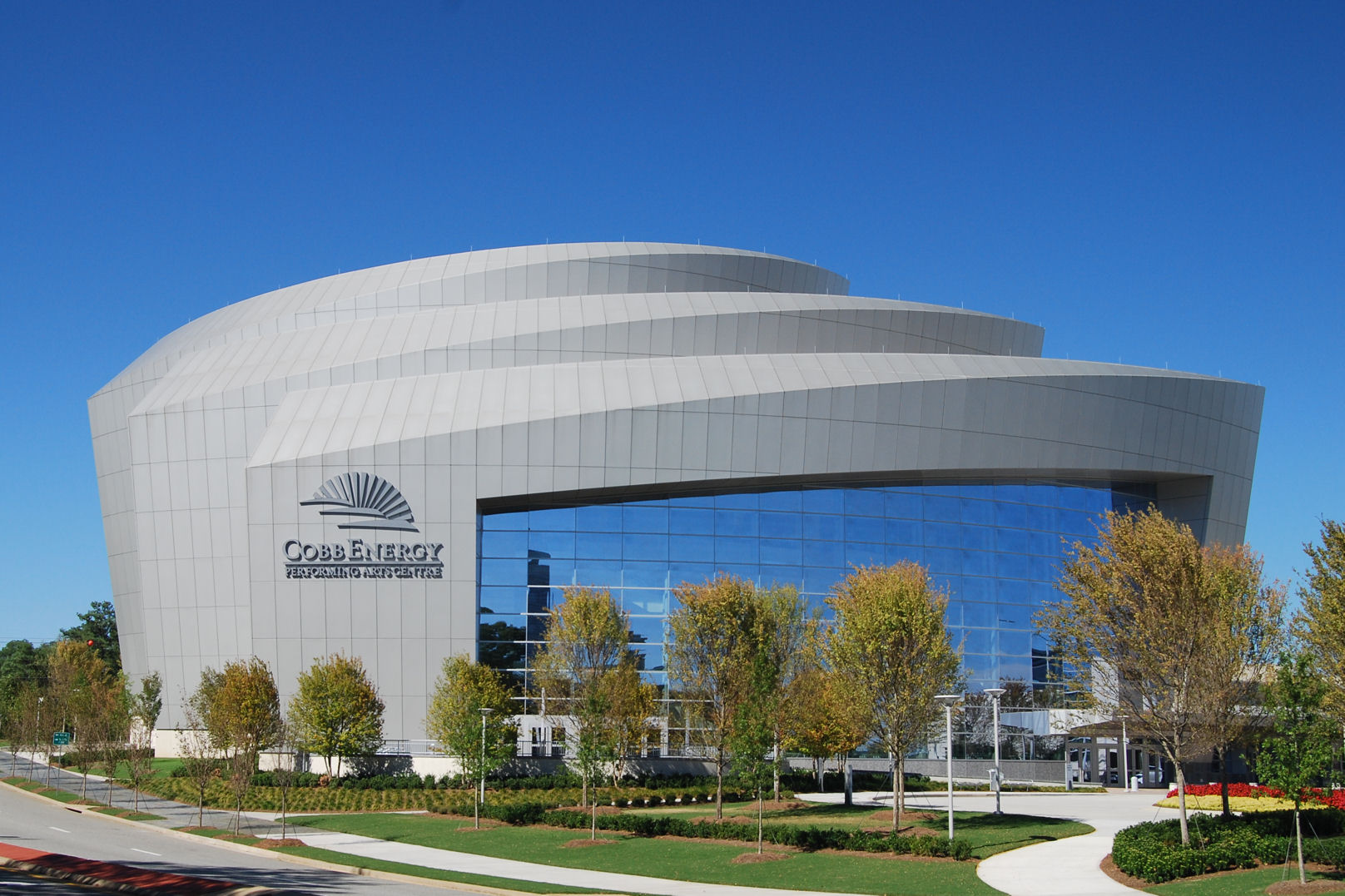
Cobb Energy Centre

Cumberland has changed immensely over the past 50 years. From 1927 to 1960, the area contained Camp Bert Adams, a Boy Scout reservation which still has a road bearing its name in the Vinings vicinity (the camp moved in 1960 to a site south of Covington). The area began seeing growth following World War II, but major development did not occur until Cumberland Mall opened as Georgia's largest and metro Atlanta's sixth enclosed regional mall in 1973. A decade later, the first office tower of Cobb Galleria was built on 86 acres (350,000 m^{2}) of prime space in what became the heart of the Cumberland district. This paved the way for several other towers, retail strips and hotels. In 1988, property owners formed the Cumberland Community Improvement District (Cumberland CID), the first in Georgia.

The CID, a self-taxing district, has raised millions and has completed several infrastructure improvements in the area since its inception. During the summer of 1994, the Cobb-Marietta Exhibit Hall and Coliseum Authority built the $48 million Cobb Galleria Centre by renovating the existing mall there, and it has become another success for the district. A few small shopping centers were constructed in the mid-1990s, and a Cumberland Mall expansion and renovation was completed in 2006. Construction was completed on the Cobb Energy Performing Arts Centre in late 2007, adding nightlife to the area. The Atlanta Opera, founded in 1979, moved its base to this location.

== Economy ==
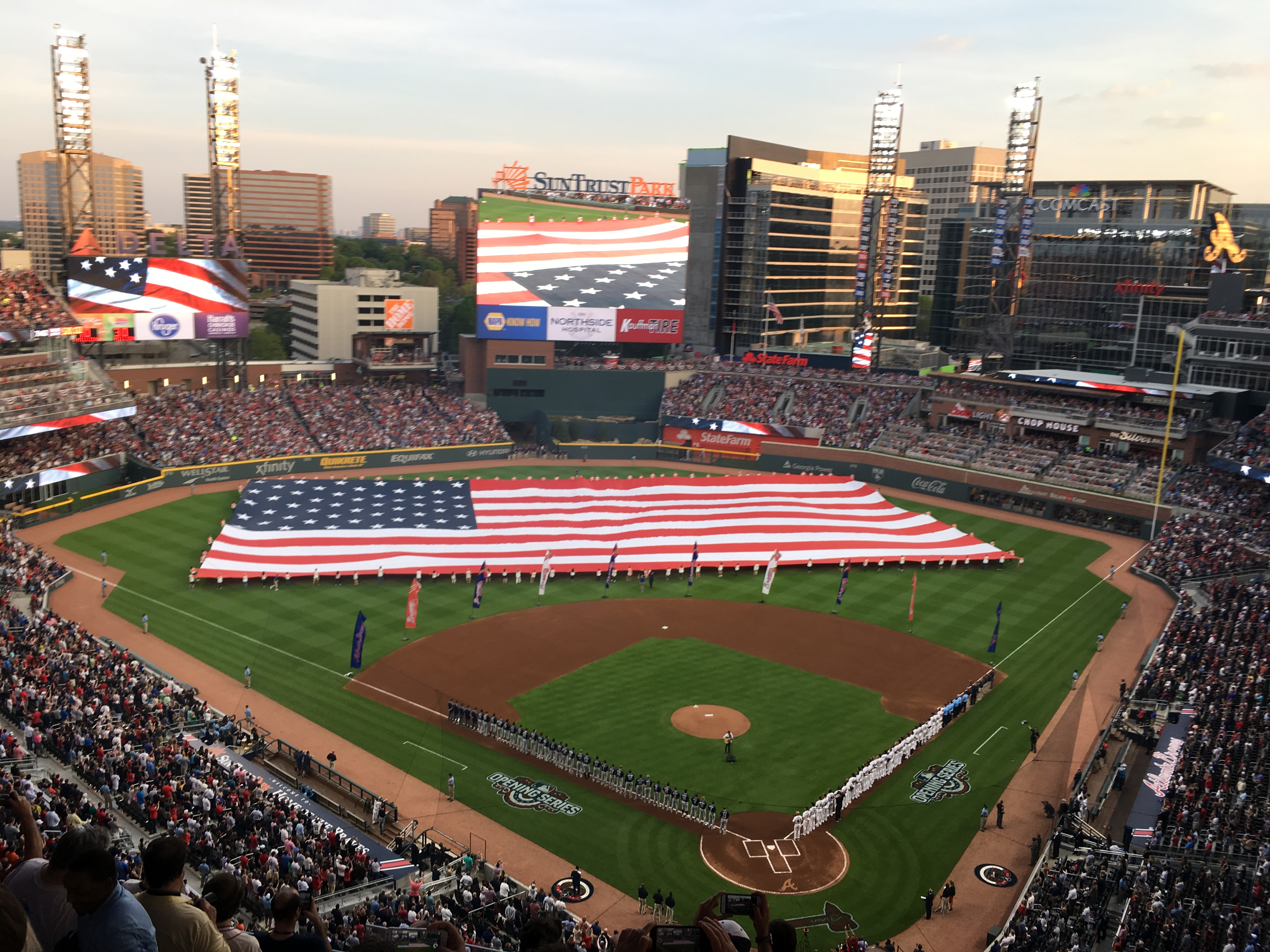
Truist Park with the Battery Atlanta high rises in the right background

Cumberland houses some 10 million ft^{2} (930,000 m^{2}) of retail, with its focal point being Cumberland Mall.

In 2017, the Atlanta Braves opened Truist Park and The Battery Atlanta, a mixed-use development surrounding the ballpark.

== Arts and culture ==
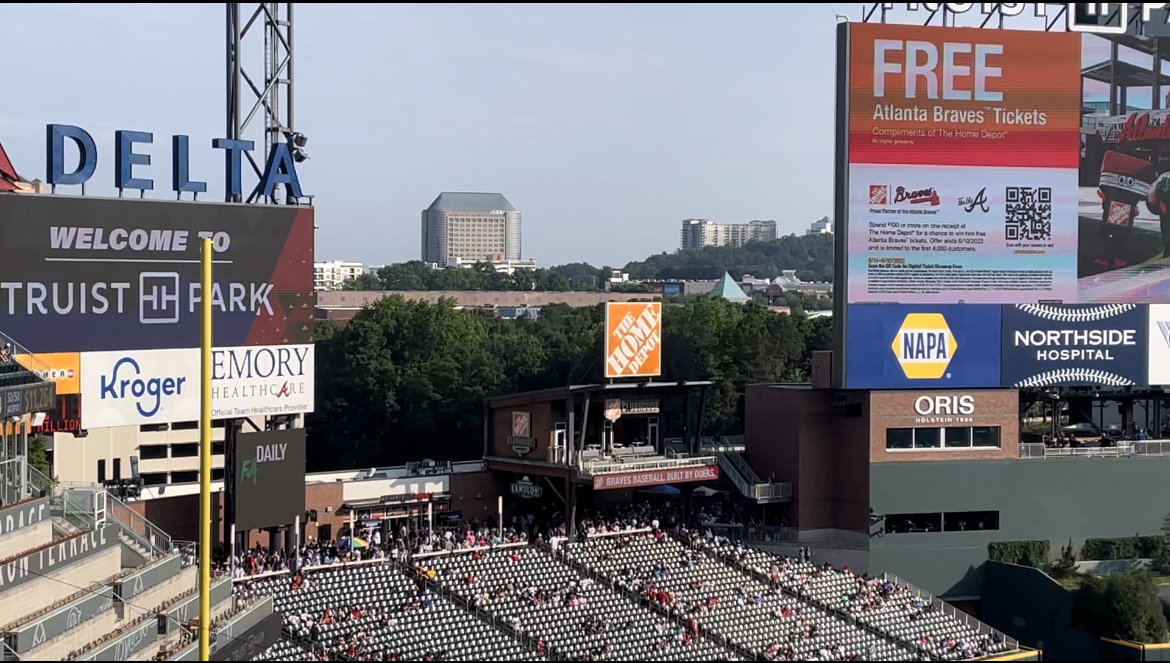
View of Cumberland from Truist Park. The Cumberland Mall and Cobb Galleria Centre can be seen in the distance

Attractions include:

- Chattahoochee River National Recreation Area
- Cobb Energy Performing Arts Centre
- Cobb Galleria Centre
- Cumberland Mall
- Truist Park
- The Battery Atlanta

== Infrastructure ==
=== Transportation ===
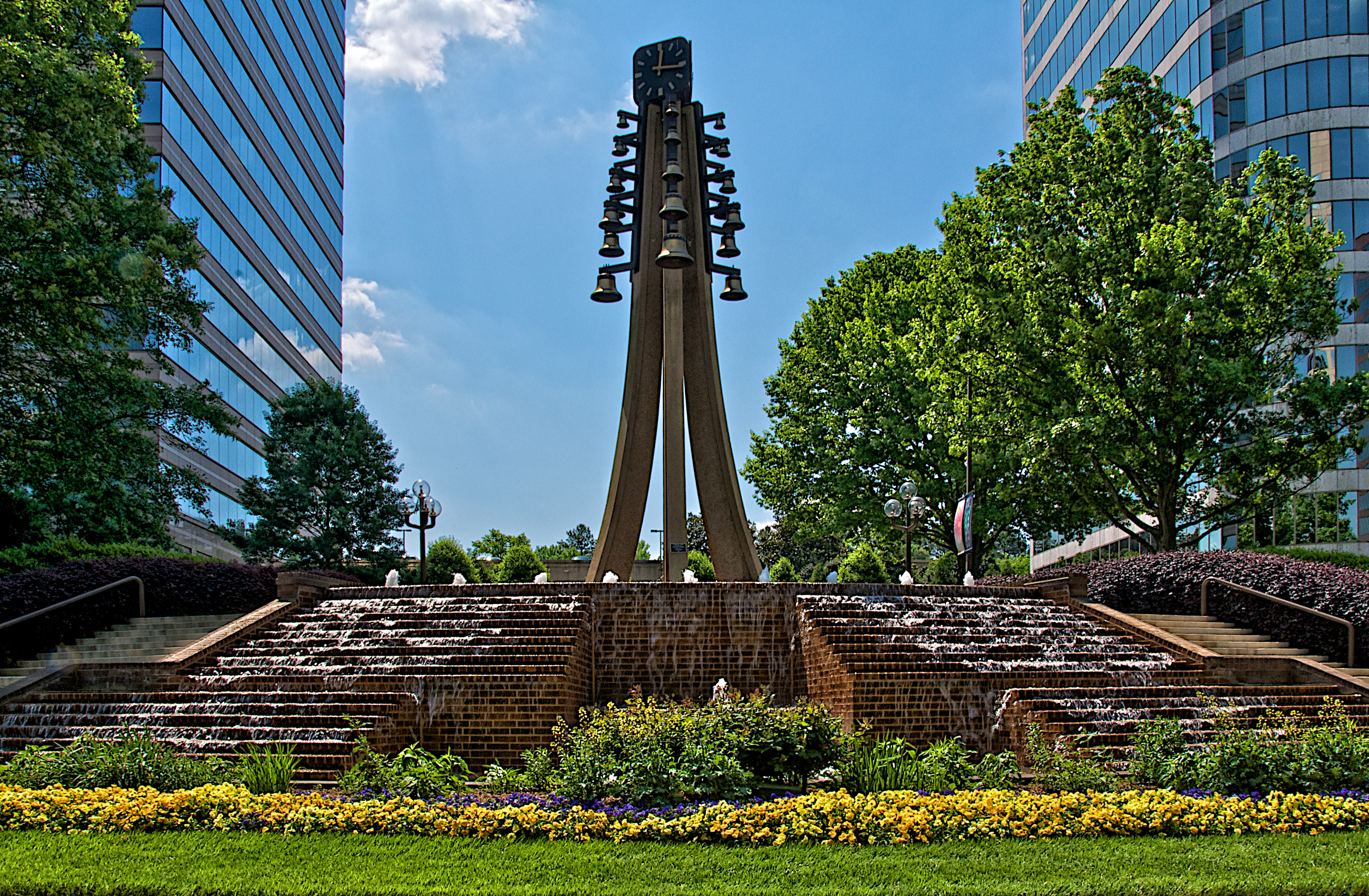
A monument in the Cobb Galleria office park

Highways include US Highway 41 (Cobb Parkway), I-75, and I-285.
