= Rich's (department store) =

Department store chain based in Atlanta, Georgia, United States (1867–2005)

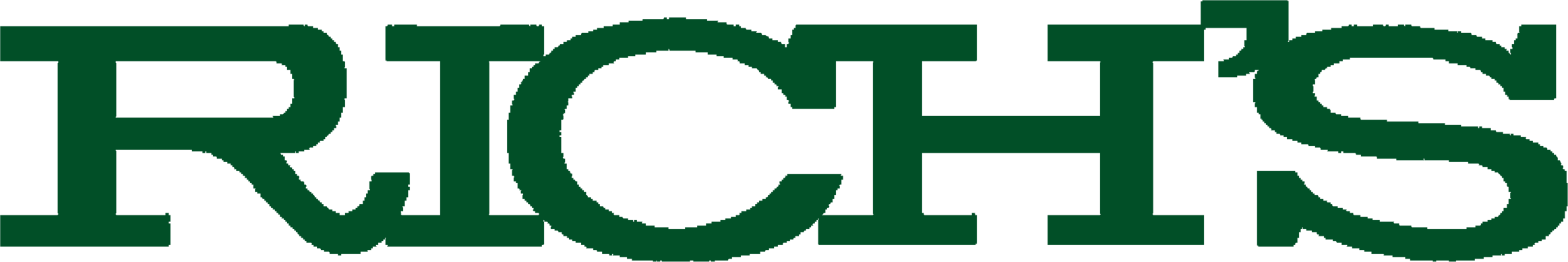

- Exterior of the former flagship store (2006)
- Formerly: Rich's–Macy's (2003–2005)
- Company type: Subsidiary
- Industry: Retail
- Genre: Department stores
- Founded: May 28, 1867; 159 years ago in Atlanta, Georgia
- Founder: Mauritius Reich
- Defunct: March 5, 2005; 21 years ago
- Fate: Acquisition by Federated Department Stores
- Successor: Macy's
- Headquarters: Atlanta, Georgia, United States
- Area served: Southern United States
- Products: Clothing; footwear; bedding; furniture; jewelry; beauty products; housewares
- Owner: Federated Department Stores (1976–2005)

Rich's was an American department store chain founded in 1867 by Mauritius Reich. It operated in the southern United States, and was headquartered in Atlanta, Georgia, until it was dissolved in favor of the Macy's brand in 2005.

== History ==
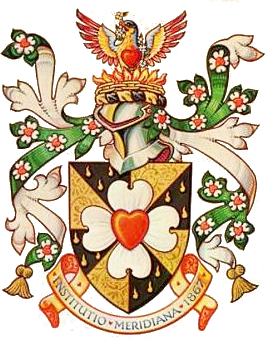

=== Beginnings ===
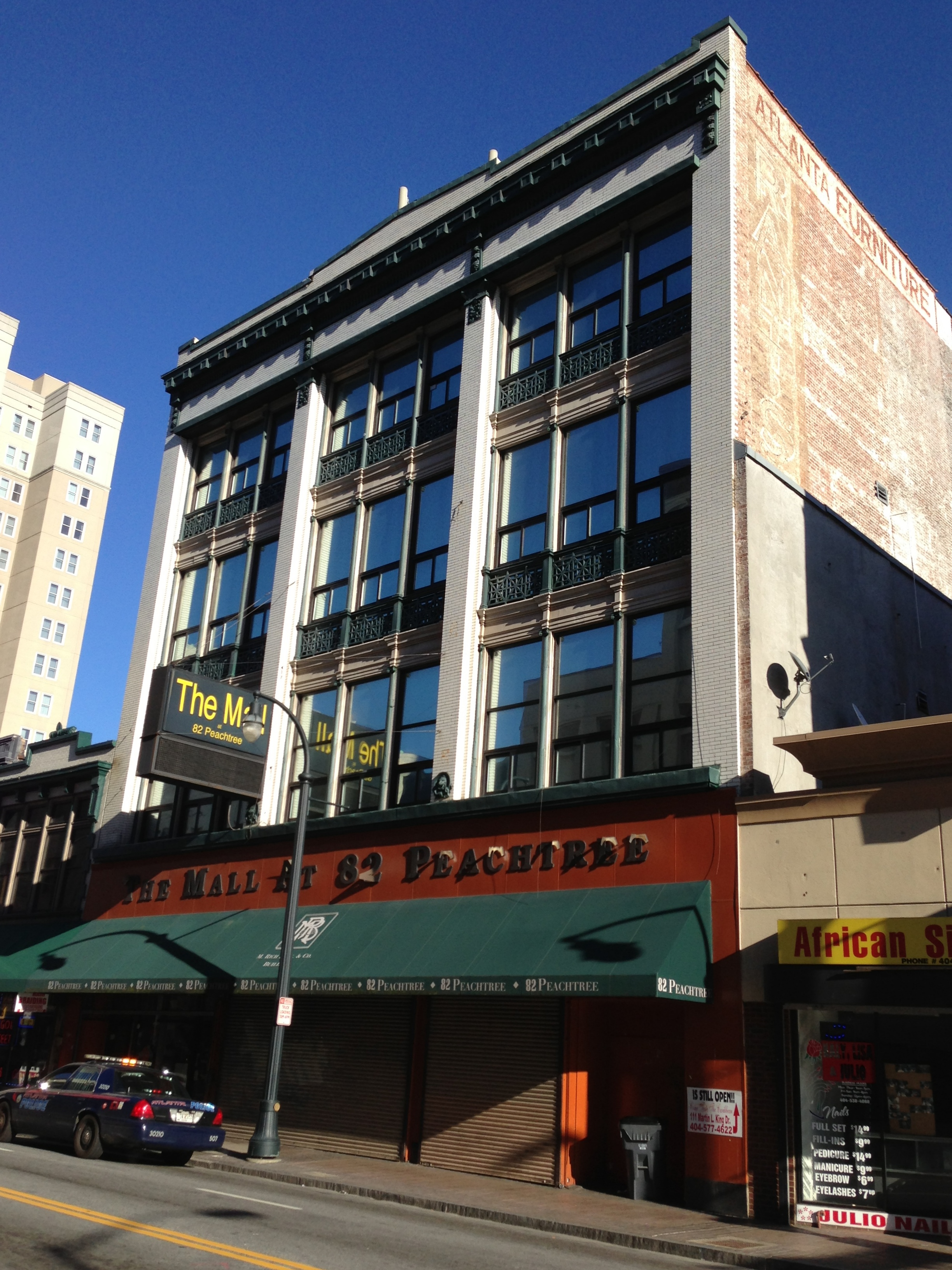
Rich's 1906 building, known as the M. Rich and Brothers and Company Building at 52-54-56 Whitehall, now 82 Peachtree St. SE, as seen in 2013.

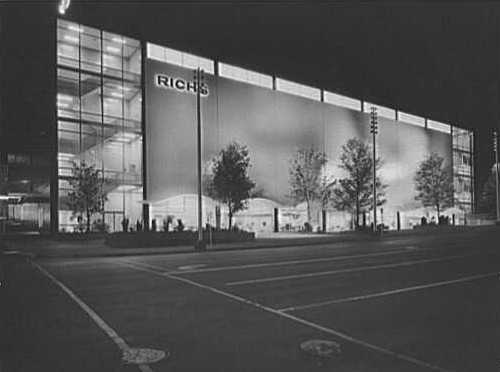
Rich's in Downtown Knoxville in 1955.

Rich's department store, Atlanta. Flagship store at 45 Broad Street which opened in 1924. Now part of the Sam Nunn Federal Center, and referred to as "The 1924 Building". From northeast facing southwest.

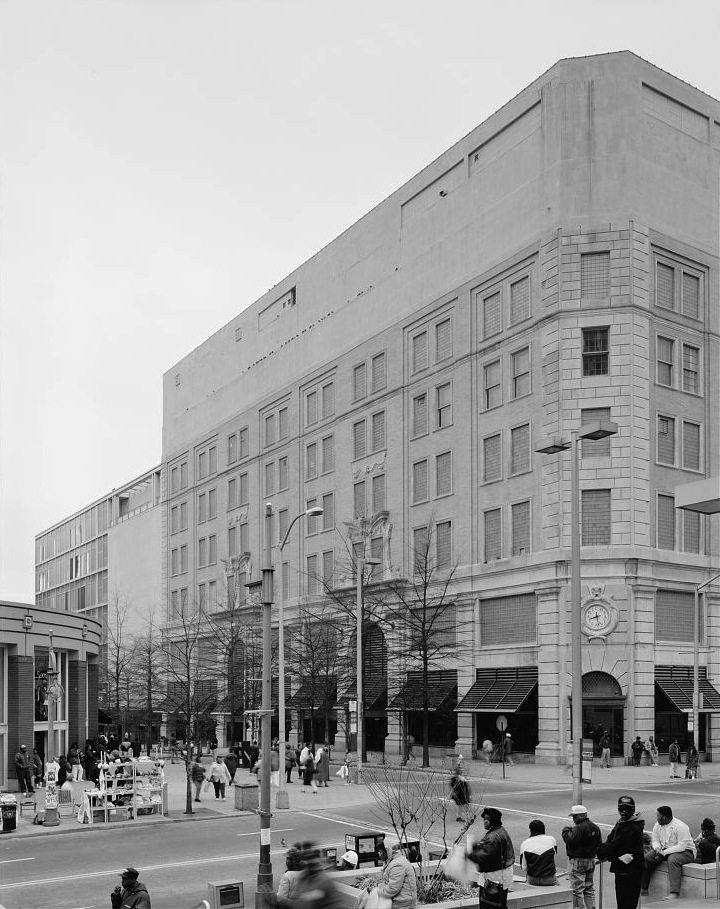
East side of 1924 store, from northeast looking southwest

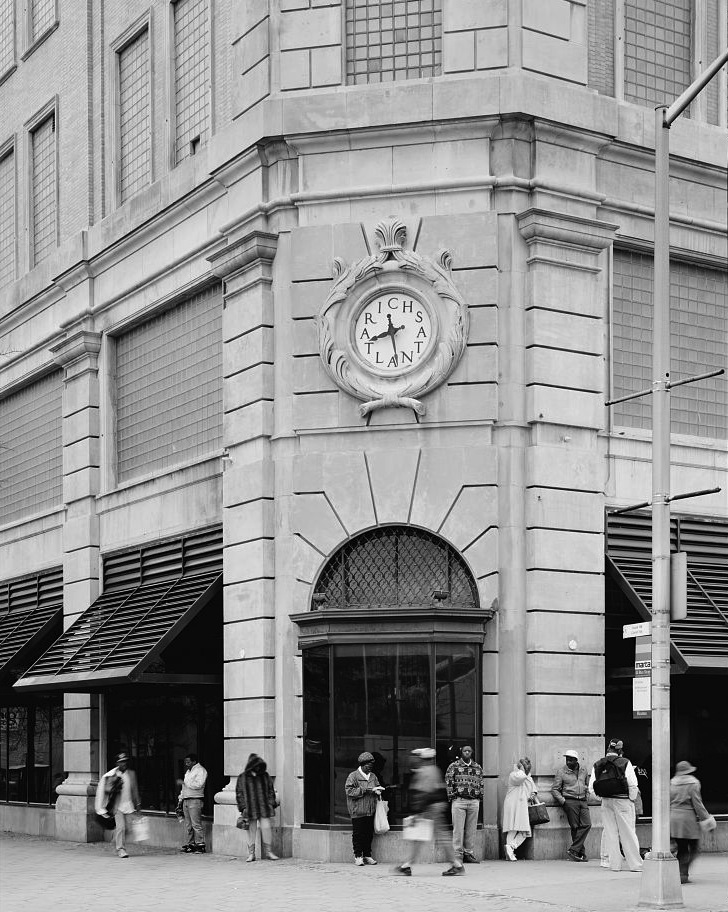
Closeup of northeast corner of 1924 store, from northeast looking southwest

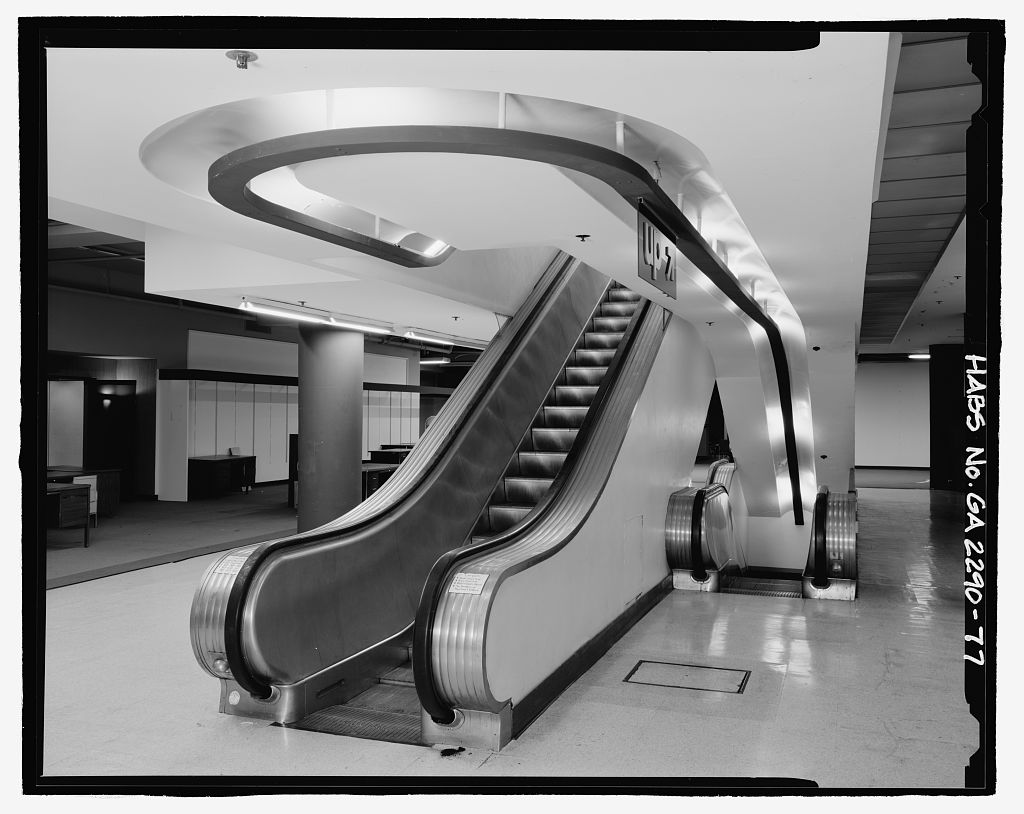
Rich's department store, Atlanta. North escalator, 5th floor furniture department. 1946-1948 "Store for Homes".

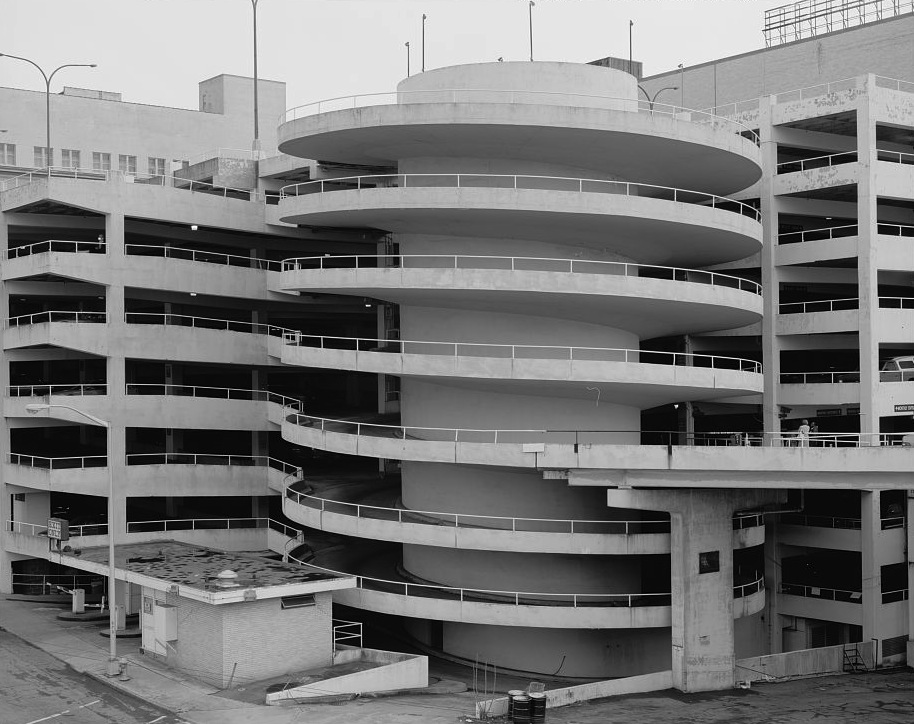
Rich's department store, Atlanta GA. View of parking deck with spiral exit ramp detail, from northwest facing southeast.

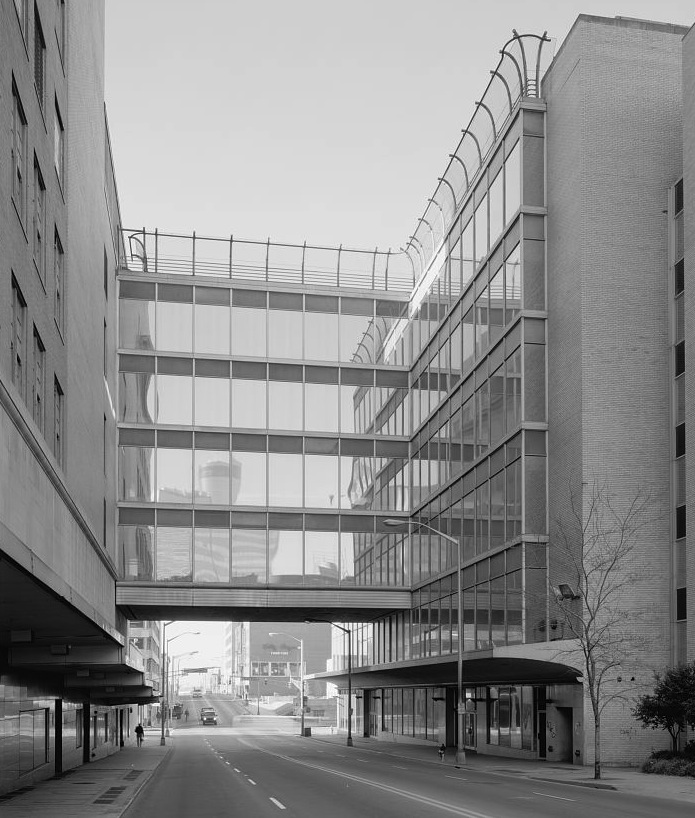
Rich's department store, Atlanta. The "Crystal Bridge" over Forsyth Street, connecting the 1924 "Store for Fashion" building to the 1946/1948 "Store for Homes" building, from north facing south.

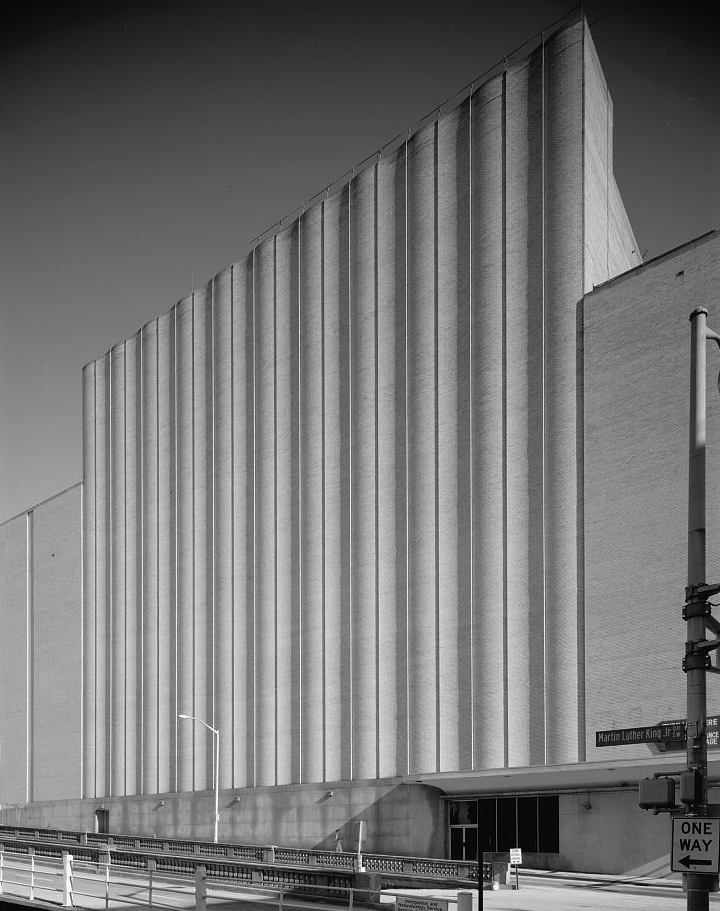
Rich's department store, Atlanta. South side of 1946-1948 "Store for Homes" and 1958 service building, from southeast facing northwest.

The retailer began in Atlanta as M. Rich & Co., a dry goods store, on 28 May 1867, at 36 Whitehall Street. The sole proprietor was Mauritius Reich (Anglicized to Morris Rich), a Hungarian Jewish immigrant. It was renamed M. Rich & Bro. in 1877, when Morris and brother Emanuel formed a partnership. In 1884, when the third brother Daniel was admitted into the partnership, the name became M. Rich & Bros. With business success came a need for expansion, and the store was moved to ever larger locations: in July 1875 to 35 Whitehall; in September 1875 to 43 Whitehall; in October 1875 to 65 Whitehall, at the corner of Hunter (now M.L. King Blvd.); and in September 1882 to 54-56 Whitehall.

By 1877, Rich's was considered one of the "Big Five" stores in town, in the league of Chamberlain, Boyton, & Co.; Ryan's; Keeley's; and Dougherty's; and later, of the J.M. High Company.

In 1901, Rich's became a true department store when they divided like merchandise into separated sections. The company was incorporated as M. Rich & Bros. Co. In 1906, the adjacent M. Kutz & Co. building at 52 Whitehall was acquired. Both it and 54-56 Whitehall were torn down. Rich's closed its furniture annex and moved its dry goods to that building, until a new building could be built on the site of 52-54-56 Whitehall. In April 1907, the new 'emporium' opened for business. That building is still standing, known as the M. Rich and Brothers and Company Building at its current address of 82 Peachtree St. SE.

In 1924 Rich's moved into its last flagship store at 45 Broad St. SE, between Alabama and Hunter streets, which it would occupy until closing in 1991. That building, now a part of the Sam Nunn Atlanta Federal Center complex, was added to eight times during its department store life. It is an example of Palazzo style architecture, a favorite theme associated with department stores constructed in the early twentieth century. The 1946/1948 Store for Homes addition, to the southeast of the 1924 building across Forsyth Street, was one of Atlanta's earliest examples of International Style architecture.

In 1929, the company was reorganized and the retail portion of the business became simply Rich's, while a new, separate venture named M. Rich & Bros. Co. would operate as a real estate company.

Daniel's son Walter Rich succeeded his uncle Morris as Rich's president from 1926 to 1947. The grandson of Morris Rich, Richard H. Rich, took over the store in 1949. Under the leadership of Richard Rich, affectionately known as Dick Rich, Rich's began expansion in the 1950s. Rich's moved outside the Atlanta area for its first new store in 1955 when a store in Knoxville, Tennessee opened. Rich's opened its first suburban store at Lenox Square in 1959, Georgia's first shopping mall. The open-air mall shared space with the other major Atlanta department store, Davison's. That same year Rich's also opened a store at Belvedere Plaza Shopping Center, a large two-level strip mall in Belvedere Park near Decatur. Rich's sold its Knoxville store to Miller's when profits declined, and refocused on its Georgia stores.

=== Holiday traditions ===
Two holiday traditions associated with Rich's were the Great Tree and the Pink Pig Flyer. Starting in 1948, the Great Tree, conceptualized by executive Frank Pallotta, was a massive pine, set on top of the multi-level glass "Crystal Bridge" connecting the main downtown Atlanta store which housed the "Store for Fashion" with the "Store For Homes" across Forsyth Street. After the closure of the downtown store in 1991, the Great Tree and the annual Thanksgiving evening tree-lighting festivities, moved to nearby Underground Atlanta. After several years of poor attendance, the Tree was moved to the top of the Men's Store at the Lenox Square location. This placed the tree on the corner of the mall closest to the prominent intersection of Peachtree and Lenox Roads. The tree lighting ceremony traditionally featured country and pop music performers from Georgia, such as Kenny Rogers, several choirs from local churches, and a rendition of "O Holy Night" with the tree being lit by a child during the high note of the line "O night divine."

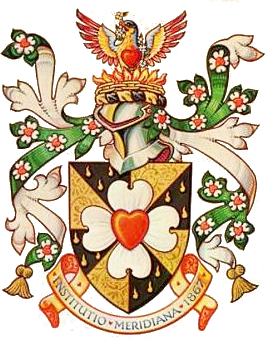
Coat of arms of Rich's department store

The Pink Pig (installed in 1956, and known originally as The Snowball Express) was a child-scaled monorail which was suspended from the ceiling of a portion of the Plaza level of the Store for Homes. Riders had a bird's-eye view of the toy department below. In 1965, it was moved to the roof of the store where a second monorail was added and the duo became known as the Pink Pig Flyers (receiving the names of Priscilla and Percival in the 1970s). The front car of the trains had pig faces and the last cars had curly tails. For many years after the closure of the downtown store, the Pink Pigs were set up at the Festival of Trees at the Georgia World Congress Center. Macy's Lenox Square continued the holiday tradition using a redesigned child-sized train (rather than a monorail) set up on the top level of the Lenox Road Parking Deck. The train ride took riders through a storybook tale of Priscilla Pig. The Pink Pig Flyer did not operate during the 2020 season due to the COVID-19 Pandemic. In September 2021 Macy's announced it would retire the Pink Pig Flyer. The original Pink Pig Flyers monorail cars are at the Atlanta History Center where they are occasionally displayed.

Note: Some sources incorrectly present the origination of the monorail ride as having been in 1953. When researching for his book, Rich's: A Southern Institution, author Jeff Clemmons verified the premier date was in 1956.

=== Dear Store ===
In 1967, Atlanta Constitution columnist Celestine Sibley wrote Dear Store: An Affectionate Portrait of Rich's. In it, she mentioned notable acts by Rich's staff and management, including the cashing of scrip payments made by the City of Atlanta to its schoolteachers during a financial crisis, accepting returns of worn nylons during World War II shortages, and the efforts of their personal shopper service, "Penelope Penn," to find the perfect gift for thousands of customers who wrote to them. The title of the book comes from a letter in which a child offers to trade his younger sister for a toy that he wants.

The book also relates the story of Coretta Scott King shopping at Rich's for a coat to wear in Norway at the ceremony for husband Martin Luther King Jr.'s Nobel Peace Prize. The salesperson advised Mrs. King not to buy a fur, because it would compare unfavorably to the extravagant furs worn by the Scandinavian attendees, instead selecting a conservative cloth coat for the occasion.

=== Expansion ===
Rich's most aggressive expansion was during the 1960s and 1970s. Four more stores opened in the Atlanta area in the 1960s, two of those enormous three-story full-line stores. While this expansion resulted in continued success of the chain, it chipped away at the business of the downtown store. By this time, Rich's was the leading regional department store in the country, though it remained largely unknown by the general public outside of Georgia. This would soon change, however.

Throughout the 1970s, four more Rich's locations opened in Georgia including one in Augusta, the first in the state outside of Atlanta. Rich's also began an aggressive expansion with stores in Alabama and South Carolina. Also, there were plans much later in the early 1990s to expand Rich's into Charlotte, but these were scrapped. Of all the stores out of state, stores opened in Greenville, Columbia and Birmingham (with two, adding a third in 1986) created stiffer competition in those cities against regional chains Pizitz, Loveman's and Parisian.

=== Federated ===
The sale to Federated in 1976 ended over 100 years of ownership by the Rich family. Aside from the Great Tree, most of the traditions of Rich's and the departments (including the bakery) were stripped away by the early 1990s. Loyalty to the chain, however, remained very strong even after the downtown flagship store was closed in 1991.

In 1994, the parent company of Rich's bought out Macy's, which was historically Atlanta's rival chain under the Davison's banner. The following year, Rich's was merged with Lazarus in the midwest and Goldsmith's in Memphis. Through the merged division, the chain grew in a corporate sense as it was operated from Atlanta, but the Lazarus and Goldsmith's stores continued to operate under their regional names. The merger with Goldsmith's occurred in 1988 and Lazarus in 1995. Lazarus was one of Federated's founding store chains.

=== Closures of Davison's/Macy's stores ===
When Rich's and Macy's both were owned by the same company, this resulted in the overlapping of the two chains all selling the same products. Initially, both stores remained open with Macy's losing its higher-end merchandise and becoming distinctly downmarket when compared with Rich's. The decision was made in 2003 to close all of the former Davison's/Macy's stores in Atlanta (no new Macy's stores had been built in Atlanta since Town Center at Cobb in 1986) and co-brand Rich's as Rich's-Macy's. The only original Macy's/Davison's store to remain open is Northlake Mall - originally the downtown Atlanta store was to remain open, but a sudden change of direction by Macy's corporate closed the last major retailer in downtown Atlanta. The cobranded name change was intended to slowly phase out the chain instead of a sudden change so as to reduce the backlash over the elimination of an Atlanta institution that was one of the institutions that defined the city, similar to Marshall Field's in Chicago.

The same year that Rich's and Macy's merged, the downtown Macy's (Davison's flagship store) was closed. Also in the merger, the Lenox Square Macy's and Perimeter Mall Macy's (both former Davison's) reopened as Bloomingdale's. The Perimeter Mall Macy's closed in March 2012, reopening as a branch of the Von Maur chain. The Greenbriar Mall Macy's closed in April 2021. The Cumberland Mall, Lenox Square, Northlake Mall, and Town Center Macy's remain open as of 2022. When the Cobb Center Mall store closed in 2004, the furniture clearance center was relocated to Town Center.

In 1995, the downtown Atlanta Rich's 1924 store became part of the Sam Nunn Atlanta Federal Center. It is known as "The 1924 Building". The Store For Homes, the "Crystal Bridge," and a concrete parking deck with a locally-famous spiral down ramp were razed, and replaced by a high-rise, a small building containing a McDonald's and other retail space, and a more substantial connector between the high-rise and the original 1924 Rich's building. The top floor of the 1924 building, a later addition of concrete and glass block not in the style of the original, was removed. An addition in the style of the original was built on the corner of Forsyth and Old Alabama Streets, which had been a park and previously the location of the offices of The Atlanta Journal before its merger with The Atlanta Constitution.

=== Name changes ===
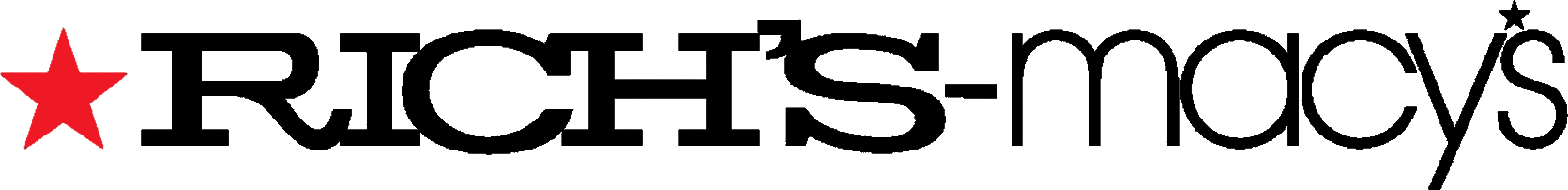
Rich's-Macy's transition logo

After 138 years, Rich's (later as Rich's-Macy's) brand disappeared on March 6, 2005. Other historical retail nameplates "Goldsmith-Macy's" and "Lazarus-Macy's" were eliminated, with the stores rebranded as Macy's. Atlanta-area stores are in the Macy's Southeast Region with Atlanta East & Atlanta West Districts. A signature event of the store, Rich's Great Tree, continued as an annual Thanksgiving event in Atlanta at the Lenox location as Macy's Great Tree until 2022. Some buildings which once housed Rich's stores continue to operate under the Macy's banner. Some former Rich's buildings are no longer in use, as the malls which housed them have shuttered. The Richway discount store chain, founded in 1968, was sold, and in 1988 became a part of Target Stores.

=== The Rich Family ===
Morris, Emanuel, and Daniel Rich are buried at Oakland Cemetery in east Atlanta. Walter Rich and Dick Rich are buried at Westview Cemetery in southwest Atlanta. Many of the Rich family descendants reside in the Atlanta area.

== Rich's Flagship Store 1924–1991 ==
The original building opened on March 24, 1924 was added onto eight times. The complex would eventually encompass two full city blocks bounded by Broad, Alabama, Spring, and Hunter (now Martin Luther King, Jr. Dr.), eventually reaching 12,500,000 sq ft (1,161,288 m^{2}) of total floor area by 1966 before reducing selling space to as little as 300,000 sq ft (27,871 m^{2}) in the mid-1980s. The Main Store's architectural style reflects the appearance of an Italian palazzo, a favorite theme associated with department stores built in the early twentieth century.

Year	Additions	Cost	Added sq ft	Total sq ft
1924	Original building			180,000
1935	1.5-story rooftop addition by architect Philip Trammell Shutze, and two more elevators	$350,000		
1937	Redesigned 3rd floor into a fashion floor with 13 specialty shops; added employee recreation area on the roof	$100,000		
Dec 1939-Sep 1940	Large five-story addition to the original building designed by Hentz, Adler & Schutze. The addition added 15,000 feet to each floor, making Rich's the largest retail store in the South.: Escalators by the Otis Elevator Company connecting the first three floors.; New shipping rooms, a new tunnel under Forsyth Street, and a new warehouse across the street	$1,000,000.	75,000	
1946-48	Store for Homes, one of Atlanta's earliest examples of International Style architecture. The new light-grey brick and granite six-story building, was designed by the Atlanta firm Toombs & Creighton, interiors by Eleanor Le Maire (New York). First floor and plaza opened in 1947, prior to the grand opening was March 29, 1948: 4-story, glass- enclosed Crystal Bridge above Forsyth Street connecting Main and Home buildings	Ca. $5,500,000		
August, 1949	1,000-car capacity, 4-story garage over Forsyth St. viaduct	$600,000		
1949 approx.	*Nursery for children on 2nd floor: Message desk on 2nd floor of Crystal Bridge			
1951	6-story Store for Men (new building): 2 new (segregated) cafeterias, one for white employees (350 seats) and one for black employees (with lockers and restrooms); New snack bar, new pharmacy			
1957	Rich's bought the rest of the block where their main store was.	$2,000,000		
Fall 1958	*3-story Service Building designed by Stevens & Wilkinson.: Its top floor (at Spring St. viaduct level) was used as a 400-500-car parking lot.; New escalators, enlarged soda bar, new cafeteria for black customers			
1961	6-level self-parking garage for 6,500 cars (expanded in 1962), and a tire center.			1,117,382 (Jan 1962)
1964 and 1966	Expansions to the 1958 Service Building			
1966	6-floor addition to Main Store adding 130,000 square feet of selling space		130,000	1,247,382

== See also ==
- List of department stores converted to Macy's
