= Kessler's =

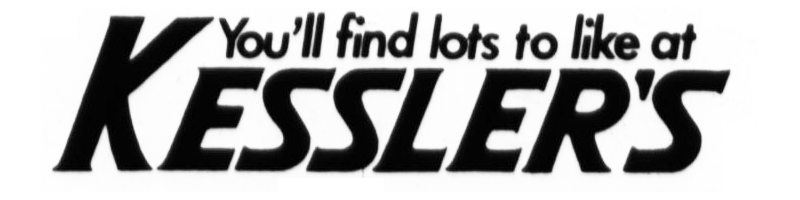
Kessler's logo from 1975

Kessler's was a family-owned lower-end department store chain in Georgia. The chain included a main store in downtown Atlanta and seven other locations: Smyrna, Rome, Newnan, West Point, Decatur, West Atlanta, and Canton.

The first Kessler's department store opened in Macon in 1914. In 1932, the family moved to Atlanta, where Hyman and Walter H. Kessler opened a store in downtown the following year. The Kessler family closed all stores in 1998. The downtown Atlanta store has since been converted into condominiums.
