= Cobb Energy Performing Arts Centre =

Concert hall in Atlanta, Georgia

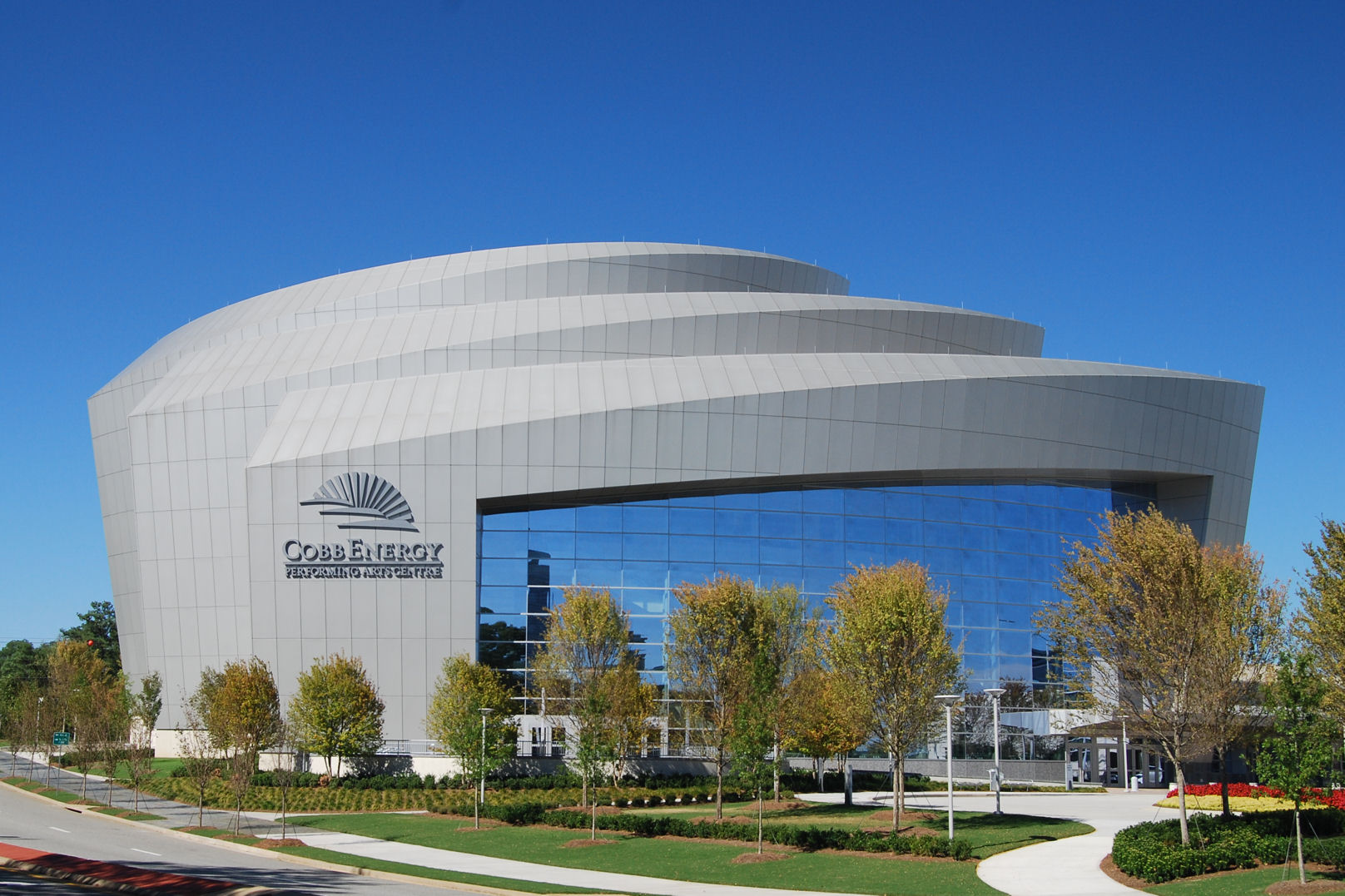
- The Cobb Energy Performing Arts Centre in 2007.
- Interactive map of Cobb Energy Performing Arts Centre
- Address: 2800 Cobb Galleria Parkway; Atlanta, Georgia; United States
- Coordinates: 33.883803°N 84.458063°W
- Owner: Cobb-Marietta Coliseum & Exhibit Hall Authority
- Operator: Cobb-Marietta Coliseum & Exhibit Hall Authority
- Capacity: 2,750
- Type: Performing arts center
- Parking: 1,000 spaces

Construction
- Opened: September 15, 2007
- Architects: Smallwood, Reynolds, Stewart, Stewart & Associates

Website
- cobbenergycentre.com

Cobb Energy Performing Arts Centre is a performing arts venue located in the Cumberland/Galleria edge city, in northwest Atlanta, Georgia, United States. The $145 million facility celebrated its grand opening September 15, 2007, with a concert by Michael Feinstein and Linda Eder.

Located in Cobb County near Vinings, the venue is owned and operated by the Cobb-Marietta Coliseum & Exhibit Hall Authority, and took over two years to build. The naming rights for the facility were acquired for $20 million by Cobb Energy Management Corp. Real estate developer John A. Williams' personal donation of $10 million led to the theater itself being named in his honor.

== Design and construction ==
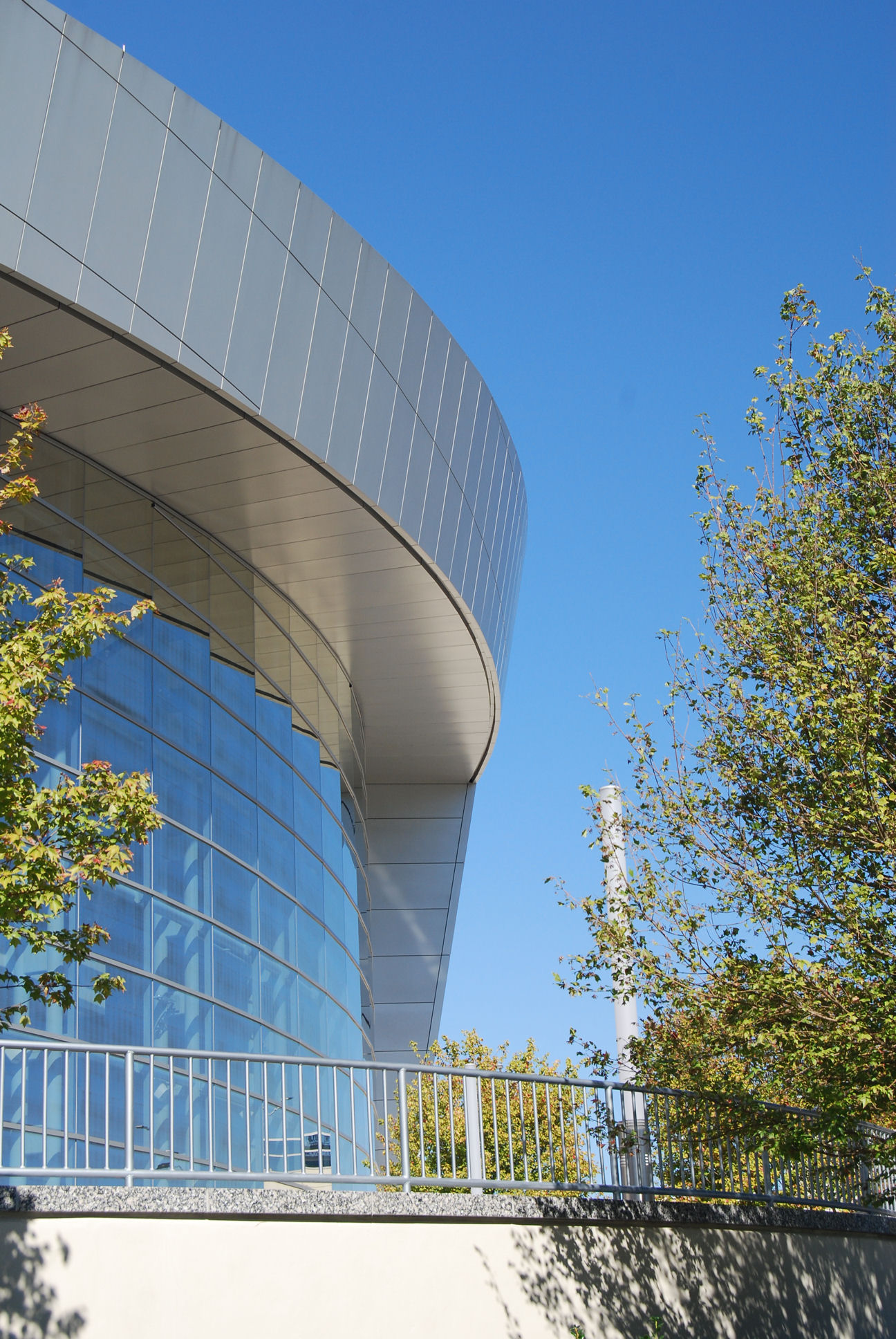
Facade

Cobb Energy Centre is located at the east corner of Akers Mill Road and Cobb Galleria Parkway, overlooking I-75 just south of the I-285 highway interchange (the Cobb Cloverleaf). It was designed by architects Smallwood, Reynolds, Stewart, Stewart & Associates, and built by general contractor Hardin Construction.

The asymmetrical top of the building rises above the multi-story glass facade that allows views of the grand alabaster staircase and lobbies beyond when lit at night. The rising waves were meant to soften the transition to the fly tower required over the stage. Just inside the entrance, visitors are greeted by the commissioned mural The Nine Muses by Jimmy O'Neal. The chandeliers in the main lobby and those in the ballroom are the Nastro designed by Tobia Scarpa and made by Andromedamurano. The interior throughout the Centre makes extensive use of traditional theater colors such red and gold as well as dark wood finishes. The Cobb Energy Performing Arts Centre was completed within schedule and budget.

== Performance and other venues ==
=== John A. Williams Theatre ===
This 2,750-seat theater at the core of the centre was designed to accommodate both acoustic and amplified performances with the specific intent of attracting touring companies of Broadway shows.

Within the theatre itself, seating is distributed on three levels — orchestra, mezzanine and grand tier — and fourteen balcony boxes. The most distant seat in the upper level (Grand Tier) is only 160 feet (49 m) from the stage. Metallic-mesh triangular screens undulate across the ceiling to hide catwalks. The stage features a hydraulic lift for the 30-foot (9 m) deep orchestra pit large enough for 84 musicians. The theatre is surrounded by a 2 ft (61 cm) thick concrete wall on the perimeter for acoustic isolation.

The centre's first resident company is the Atlanta Opera, which relocated from the cavernous Atlanta Civic Center in downtown Atlanta. The Opera's first production in the new facility was Puccini's Turandot.

=== Ballroom ===
The facility includes a 10,000 sq ft (930 m^{2}) ballroom available for event rental.

=== Other facilities ===
The adjoining parking deck has 1,000 spaces. It also has access to CobbLinc, which may move its Cumberland Transfer Station over I-75 adjacent to the center if the Northwest Corridor HOV/BRT is built. (Currently there is just HOV-only half-access at this point, for Akers Mill Road to 75 southbound and from 75 northbound.) The parking deck for the "bus rapid transit" station would be next to the centre.

== Events ==
The centre is home to the ArtsBridge Foundation, The Atlanta Opera and Atlanta Ballet. In addition, the venue has hosted numerous other concerts and events, including Kraftwerk, Fifth Harmony, Tori Amos, Demi Lovato, Alice Cooper, ABBA, Incognito, Melissa Etheridge, Bill Maher, Harry Connick Jr., B.A.P, Norah Jones, Dave Koz, Eddie Izzard, Ebi, Taeyang, Monsta X, and (G)I-dle.

The building also appeared in the first-season finale of the television show The Walking Dead, its exterior being used to represent the Centers for Disease Control and Prevention.

Cobb Energy Centre has hosted the SMITE World Championship. The most recent edition was played January 7–11, 2016 and included 10 teams from around the world competing for a US$1,000,000 grand prize. The upcoming edition, packaged as part of the new Hi-Rez Studios Expo, is scheduled for January 5–8, 2017, and will be held alongside the SMITE Xbox World Championship and the Paladins 150K Invitational. Cobb Center hosted the ELeague Season 1 semi-finals and finals on July 29–30, 2016.

== In popular culture ==
The centre was used as the conference center for the KEN talk in the 2014 film Dumb and Dumber To.

It was also used as the Center for Disease Control in AMC's The Walking Dead.

It was mentioned as a location that the Barden Bella's had performed at in Pitch Perfect

Scenes were filmed in the theatre for the 2012 film Parental Guidance.

Scenes were filmed there for the film Dumplin' on Netflix.

== Gallery ==
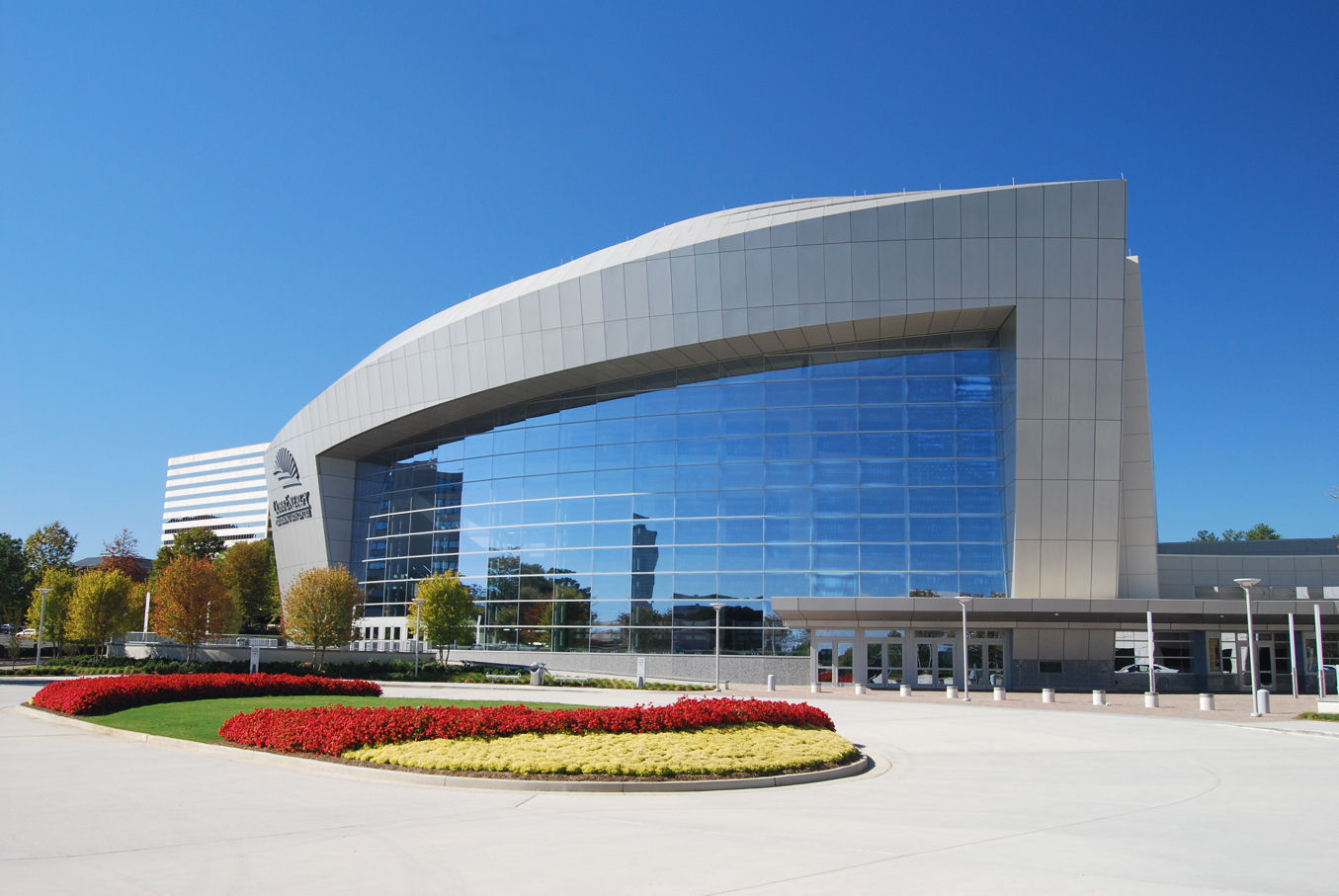

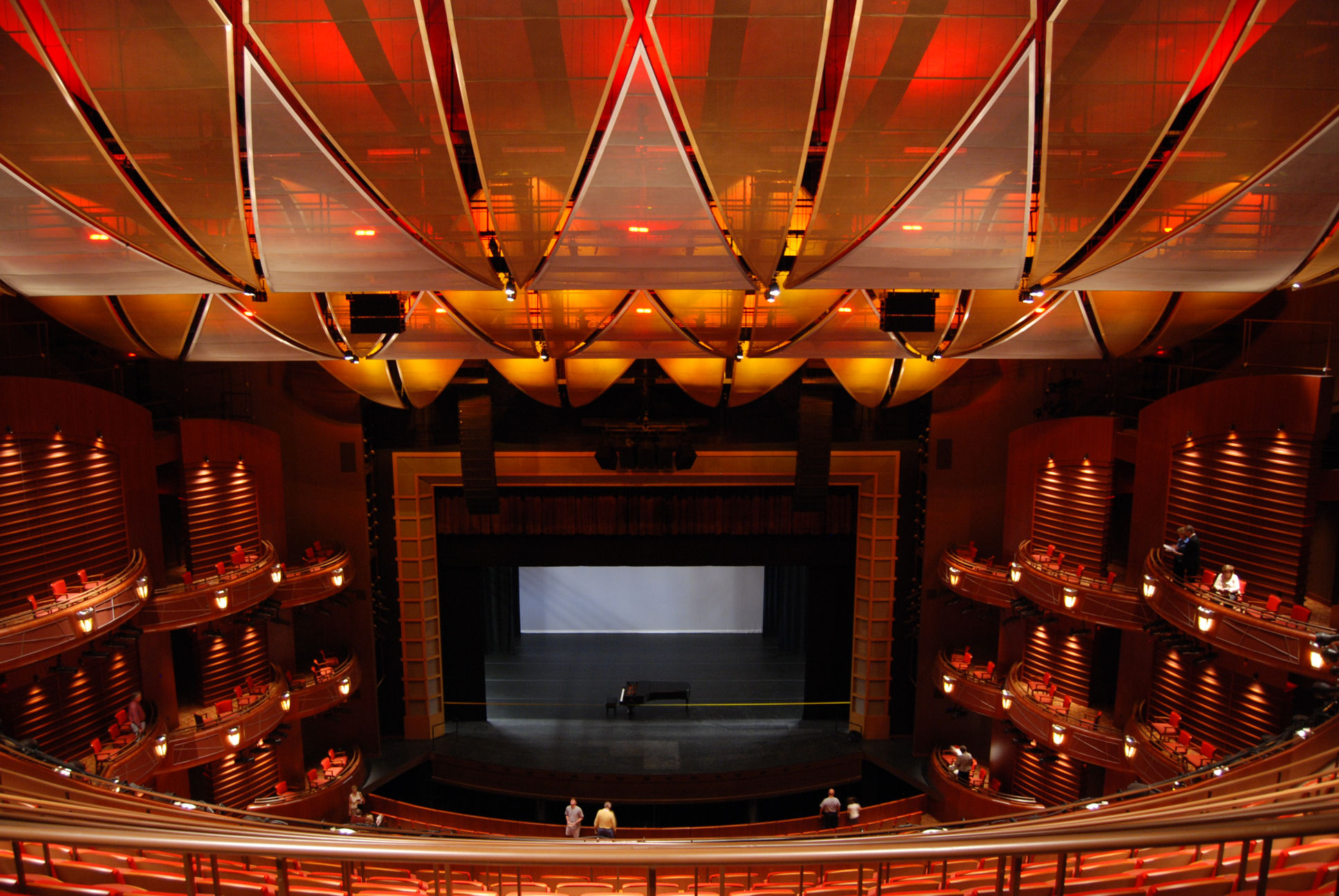

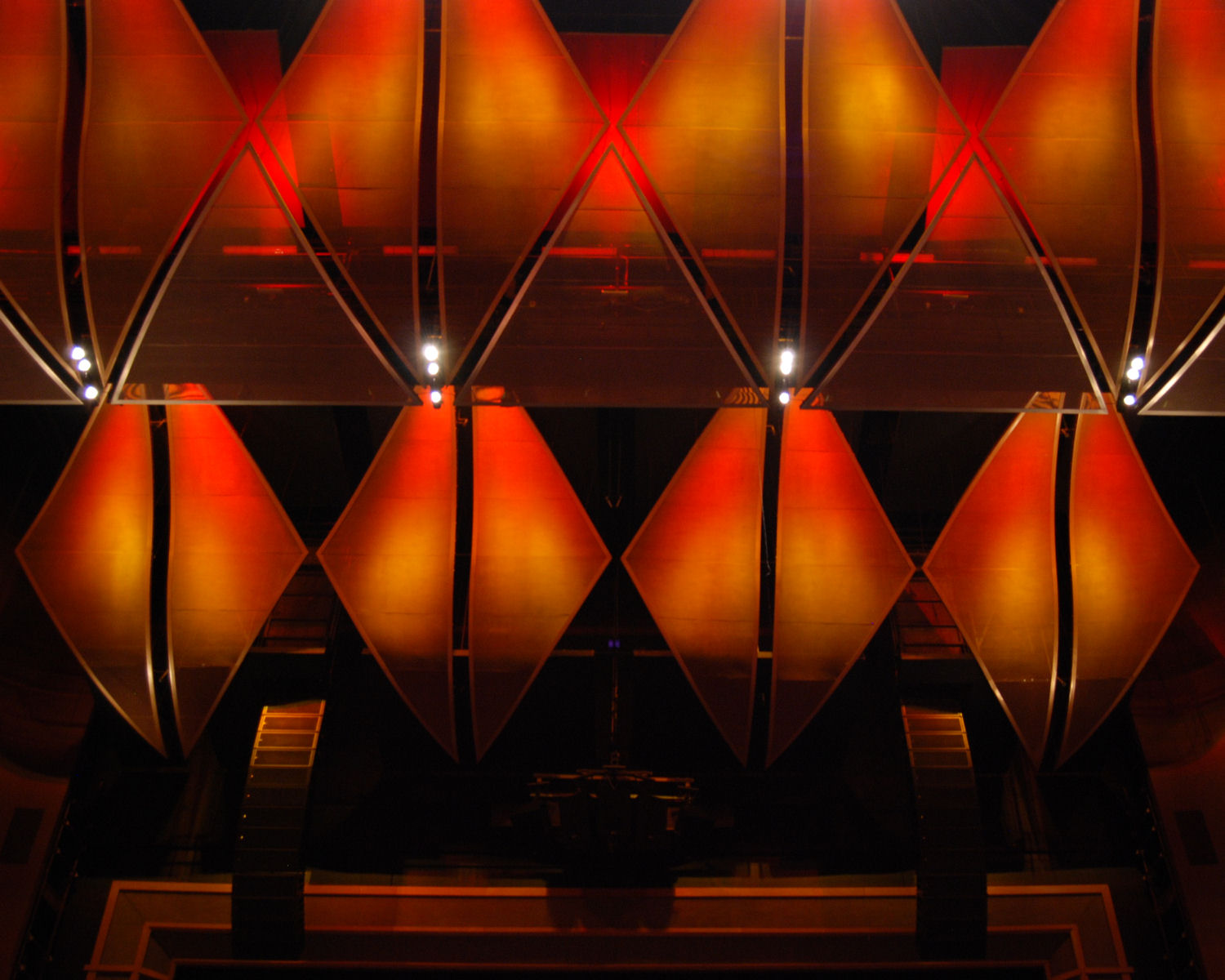

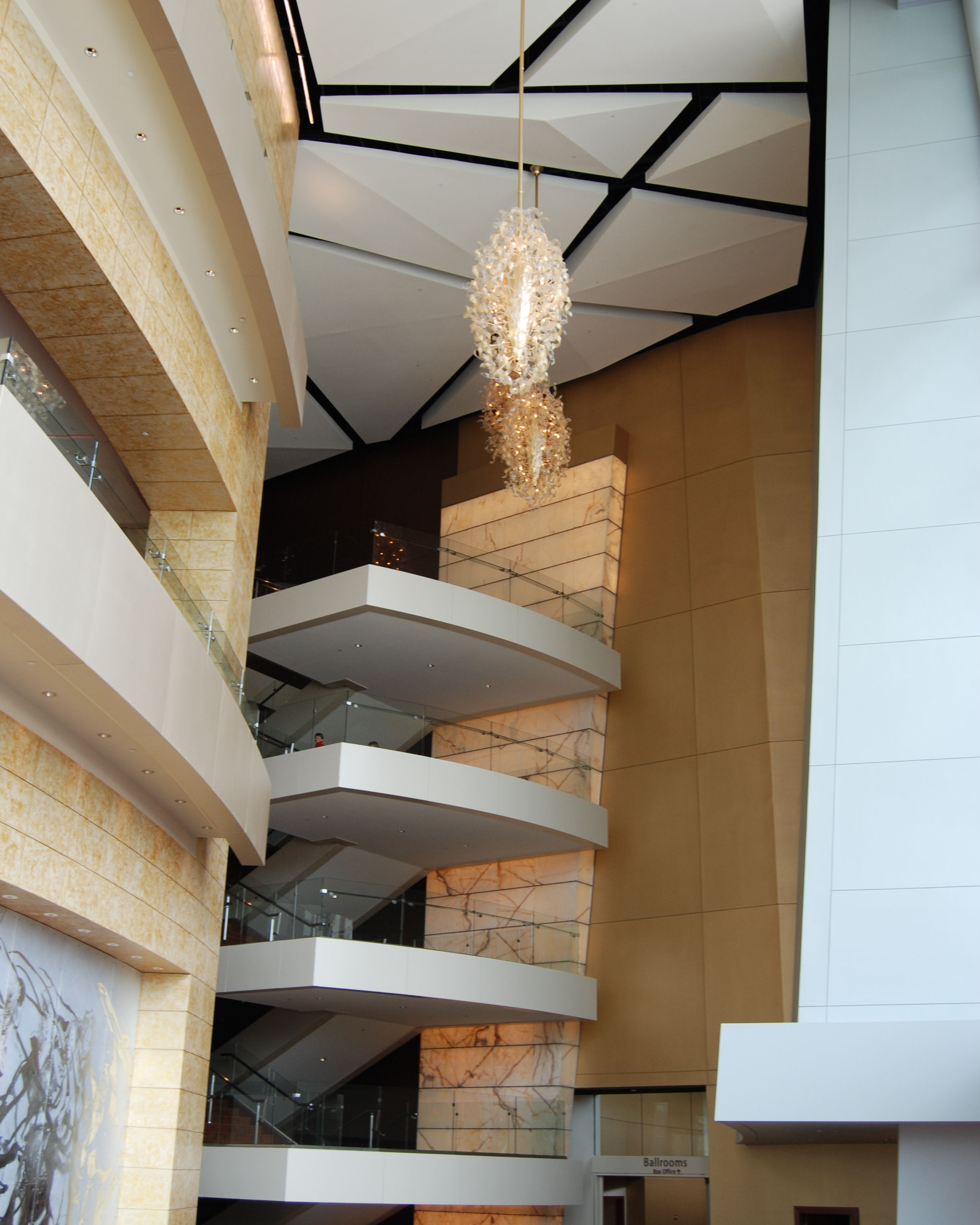
