= Arts Center station (MARTA) =

MARTA rail station

N5 Arts Center
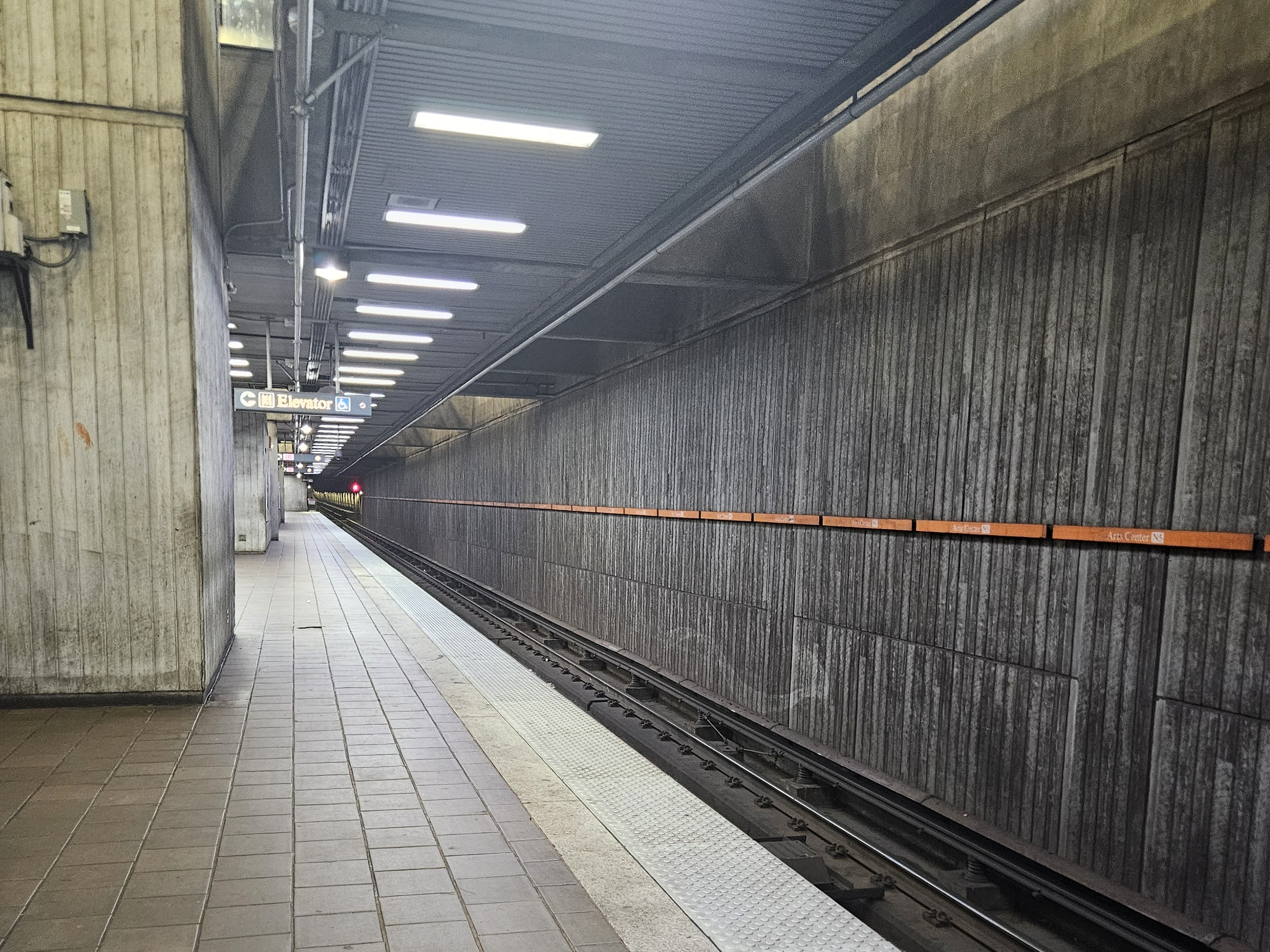
- The southbound platform in 2025

General information
- Location: 1255 West Peachtree Street; Atlanta, Georgia
- Coordinates: 33.789705°N 84.387789°W
- Owner: MARTA
- Platforms: 1 island platform
- Tracks: 2
- Connections: MARTA Bus: 27, 37, 40, 94, 110; CobbLinc; Ride Gwinnett; GRTA; Atlantic Station Shuttle

Construction
- Structure type: Underground
- Parking: 33 daily parking spaces
- Accessible: Yes
- Architect: Muldawer-Patterson, Jenkins Fleming

Other information
- Station code: N5

History
- Opened: December 18, 1982; 43 years ago

Passengers
- 2013: 6,605 (avg. weekday) ▼0.54%

Services
Preceding station	MARTA	Following station
Midtown toward Airport	Red Line	Lindbergh Center toward North Springs
Midtown toward Airport	Gold Line	Lindbergh Center toward Doraville
Location

Arts Center station is an underground subway station that serves the Red and Gold lines of the Metropolitan Atlanta Rapid Transit Authority (MARTA) rail system. It is the northernmost of three MARTA stations that serve Midtown Atlanta, the others being Midtown and North Avenue. North of this station, Lindbergh Center, the tracks emerge out from the subway as it approaches the above ground station.

Arts Center is an underground station with four levels: the platform level, the mezzanine level with fare gates facing onto West Peachtree Street, bus bays for bus feeder routes, and the upper level which is located across the street from the Woodruff Arts Center. This is the seventh-busiest station in the MARTA system, handling an average of 6,605 entries per weekday.

Arts Center is MARTA rail's primary connecting point to Peachtree station, Atlanta's current Amtrak intercity rail station, located approximately one mile to the north. MARTA's Route 110 bus to Buckhead provides direct service from Arts Center to Peachtree station and points north.

== Station layout ==
U	Bridge Level	Parking Lot
G	Street Level	Entrance/Exit, bus loops
M	Mezzanine	Fare barriers
P Platform level	Southbound	← Red Line, Gold Line toward Airport (Midtown)
P Platform level	Island platform, doors will open on the left
P Platform level	Northbound	Gold Line toward Doraville (Lindbergh Center) → Red Line toward North Springs (Lindbergh Center) →

== History ==
The Arts Center Station was opened on December 18, 1982, the same day as the Midtown Station. It served as the northern terminus for both the Gold and Red Lines(at that time called the Northeast-South Line and North-South Line, respectively) until December 15, 1984, when the Brookhaven/Oglethorpe and Lindbergh Center Stations became the new Gold and Red Lines northern terminus, respectively until future expansion expanded the lines yet again.

Just north of the Arts Center Station is a stub provision for the unbuilt Northwest Line, which was originally intended to run to Cobb County, but when Cobb County failed to pass a referendum for the 1% sales tax necessary to participate in MARTA, the line was truncated to a two-station spur serving the Brookwood neighborhood and Northside Drive. Eventually, the proposed branch was cancelled in favor of expanding the Red Line (then the North-South line) past the Buckhead station to Sandy Springs, and Dunwoody.

== Attractions ==
- High Museum of Art
- Museum of Design Atlanta
- Breman Jewish Heritage Museum
- Woodruff Arts Center
- Center for Puppetry Arts
- Center Stage Atlanta
- Piedmont Park
- Atlantic Station
- Colony Square
- One Atlantic Center
- Savannah College of Art and Design, Atlanta Campus

== Bus service ==
MARTA buses provide service to Atlantic Station, Buckhead-Lenox-Phipps Plaza, Midtown, Underground Atlanta, Emory University Hospital Midtown and Piedmont Hospital through these routes:

- Route 27 - Cheshire Bridge Road
- Route 37 - Defoors Ferry Road
- Route 40 - Peachtree Street / Downtown
- Route 94 - Northside Drive
- Route 110 - Peachtree Road / Buckhead

The station has free shuttle buses to Atlantic Station and the Atlanta Amtrak station. It is also served by CobbLinc, Ride Gwinnett, and GRTA Xpress commuter buses.
