= Midtown station (MARTA) =

MARTA rail station

N4 Midtown
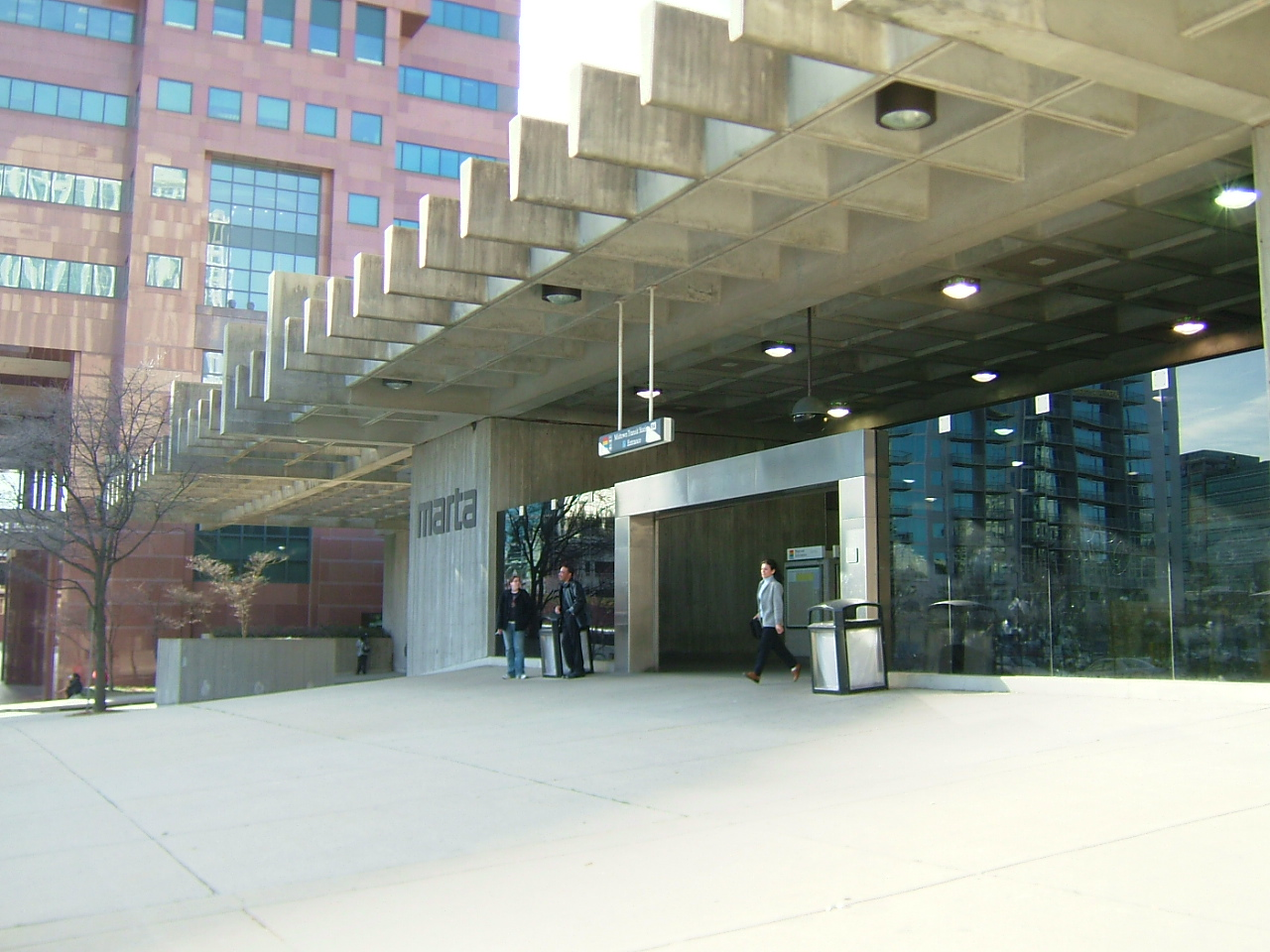

General information
- Location: 41 Tenth Street NE; Atlanta, Georgia 30309
- Coordinates: 33.781121°N 84.386345°W
- Platforms: 2 side platforms
- Tracks: 2
- Connections: MARTA Bus: 11, 12, 14; CobbLinc; Ride Gwinnett; GRTA

Construction
- Structure type: Underground
- Parking: Limited daily handicapped parking
- Cycle facilities: 3 bike racks
- Accessible: Yes
- Architect: Daniel, Mann, Johnson & Mendenhall (DMJM) / Charles F. McAfee

Other information
- Station code: N4

History
- Opened: December 18, 1982; 43 years ago

Passengers
- 2013: 5,664 (avg. weekday) ▼10%

Services
Preceding station	MARTA	Following station
North Avenue toward Airport	Red Line	Arts Center toward North Springs
North Avenue toward Airport	Gold Line	Arts Center toward Doraville
Location

Midtown is an underground subway station in Atlanta, Georgia, serving the Red and Gold lines of the Metropolitan Atlanta Rapid Transit Authority (MARTA) rail system. Located in Midtown Atlanta, 5,644 daily fares were collected at the gates as of 2013.

It provides access to the Midtown business and financial district, The Federal Reserve Bank of Atlanta, Margaret Mitchell House, Georgia Tech, and Piedmont Park. It provides connecting bus service to Cumberland Mall, Georgia Tech, Emory University, Emory Decatur Hospital, Grady Memorial Hospital, The District at Howell Mill, Atlanta Medical Center, Ansley Mall, Lindbergh Center, Atlanta Botanical Garden, and Turner Broadcasting headquarters.

== Station layout ==
G	Street Level	Entrance/Exit, station house
P Platform level	Side platform, doors will open on the right
P Platform level	Southbound	← Red Line, Gold Line toward Airport (North Avenue)
P Platform level	Northbound	Gold Line toward Doraville (Arts Center) → Red Line toward North Springs (Arts Center) →
P Platform level	Side platform, doors will open on the right

== Bus routes ==
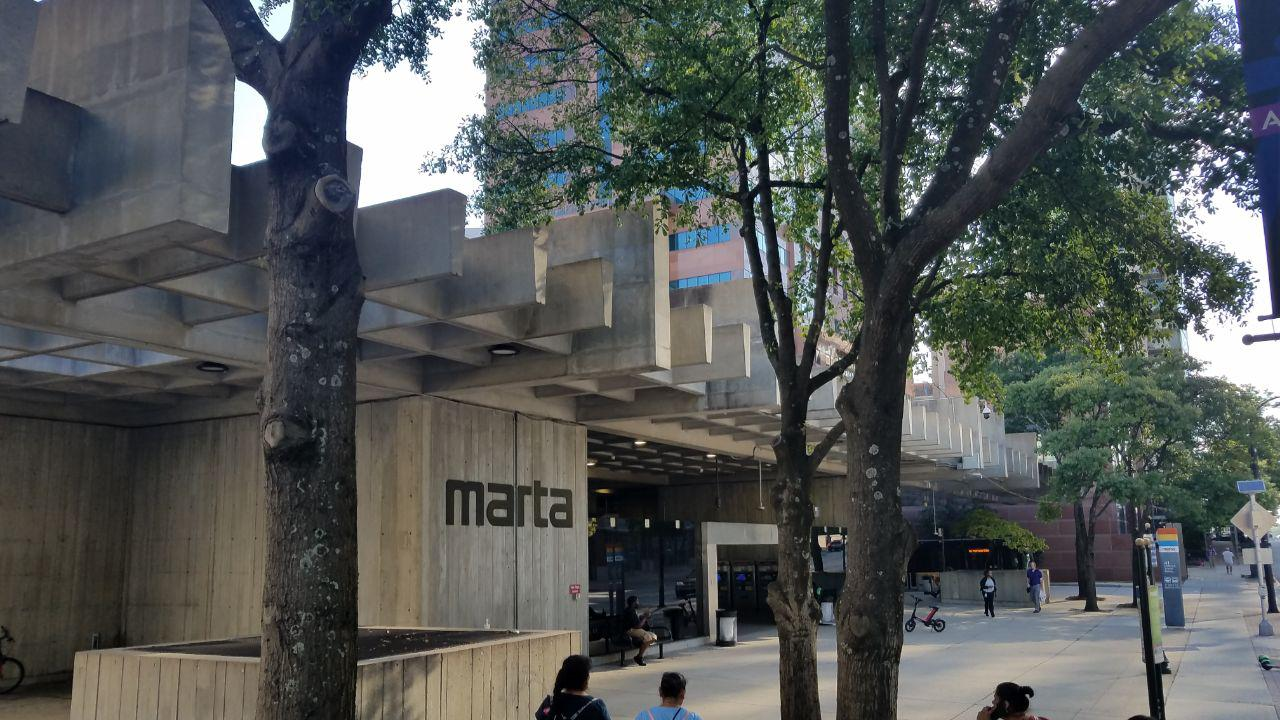
Midtown station

The station is served by the following MARTA bus routes:

- Route 11 - Defoor Avenue / Virginia Highland
- Route 12 - Howell Mill Road / Cumberland Mall
- Route 14 - Blandtown / Hightower Road

== Connection to other transit systems ==
- CobbLinc
- Ride Gwinnett
- Georgia Regional Transportation Authority
