= Gwinnett Place =

Gwinnett Place may refer to the following places in Gwinnett, the major suburban county of northeast metro Atlanta:

- Gwinnett Place Mall
- Gwinnett Place Community Improvement District, the community improvement district covering the Gwinnett Place business district which formed around the mall

== See also ==
- Gwinnett Place Transit Center, a bus station
