= C-TRAN =

C-TRAN or C-Tran refers to any of four different public transit systems in the United States:

- C-TRAN (Georgia) in Clayton County, Georgia (Atlanta area)
- C TRAN (New York) in Chemung County (Elmira)
- C-TRAN (North Carolina) in Wake County, North Carolina (Research Triangle)
- C-Tran (Washington) in Clark County, Washington (Vancouver)
