= NASCAR Thunder (retail chain) =

Defunct chain of NASCAR clothing and collectables

- Industry: Racing collectables retailer
- Founded: May 11, 1996; 30 years ago in Duluth, Georgia, US
- Defunct: March 2001; 25 years ago
- Fate: Liquidation (business decision)
- Number of locations: 11 (February 2001)
- Area served: Southeastern and Southwestern United States
- Products: die-cast toys, racing collectables
- Parent: MTV Networks (Viacom)

NASCAR Thunder was a retail chain of NASCAR collectables (die-cast toys and clothing). The chain was owned and operated by the MTV Networks subsidiary of Viacom and had 11 stores throughout the Southeastern and Southwestern United States.

NASCAR Thunder opened in May 1996 as a subsidiary of The Nashville Network (TNN), then a subsidiary of Gaylord Entertainment Company. The first store was located at the Gwinnett Place Mall in Duluth, Georgia, a suburb of Atlanta. Over the years, the chain opened more stores, including another location in Atlanta, along with additional stores in Winston-Salem, North Carolina, Knoxville, Tennessee, Jacksonville, Florida, Dallas, Texas and several other cities. Some stores also had meet and greets with several NASCAR drivers, including Darrell Waltrip, Richard Petty, and his son Kyle Petty, among others.

In 2000, CBS, which bought TNN three years prior, merged with Viacom, who announced on February 21, 2001, that it would close all 11 of its stores, citing an economic downturn as well as the company declaring the chain not profitable. The announcement came just three days after the death of NASCAR legend Dale Earnhardt during a crash at the 2001 Daytona 500 and three months after TNN and CBS lost the broadcast rights to NASCAR.
