= Atlanta Symphony Hall =

Concert hall in Atlanta, Georgia, US

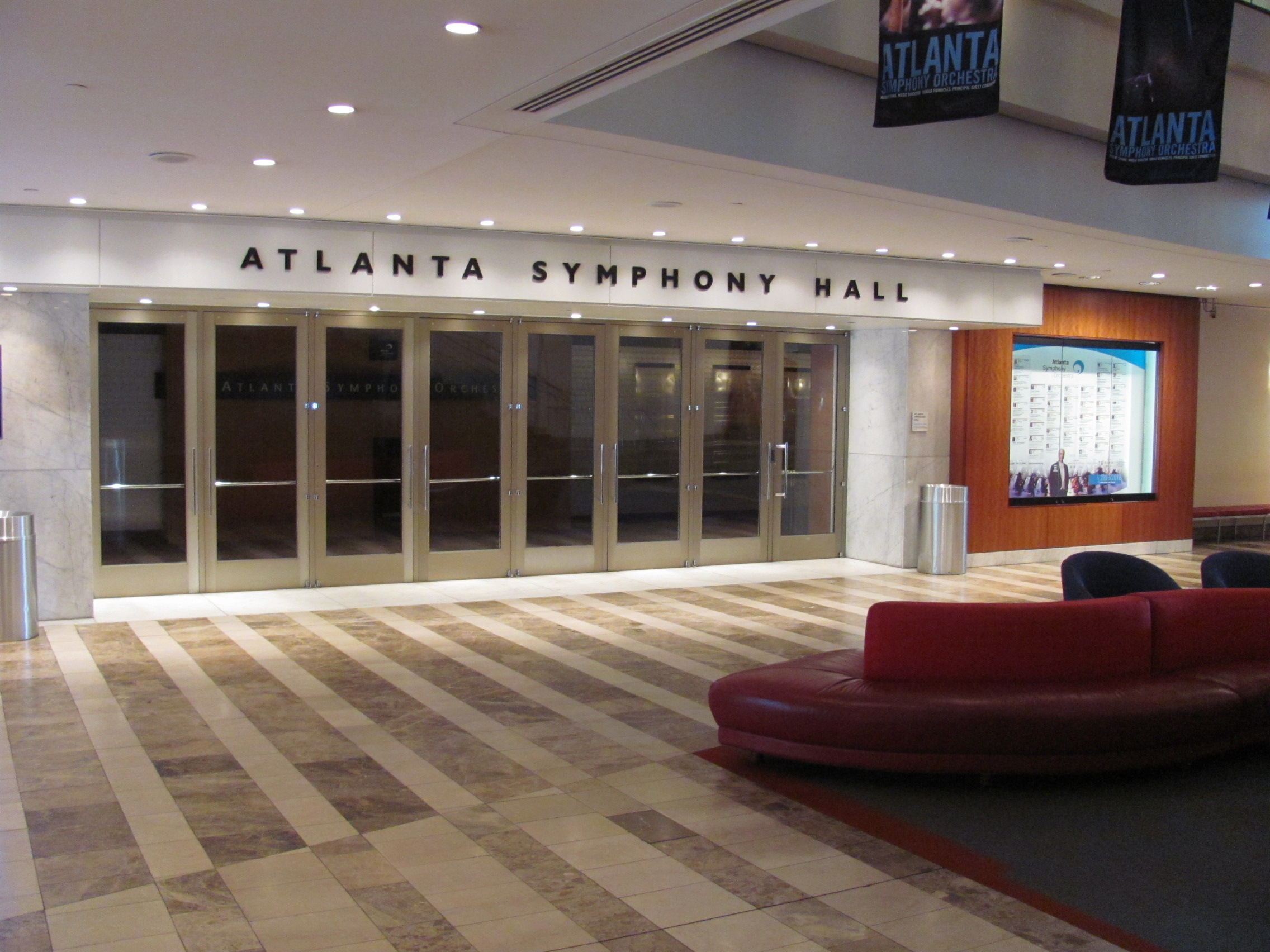
- Atlanta Symphony Hall lobby
- Interactive map of Atlanta Symphony Hall
- Address: 1280 Peachtree Street; Atlanta, Georgia; United States
- Coordinates: 33.78925°N 84.38515°W
- Owner: Woodruff Arts Center
- Capacity: 1,762
- Type: concert hall

Website
- woodruffcenter.org

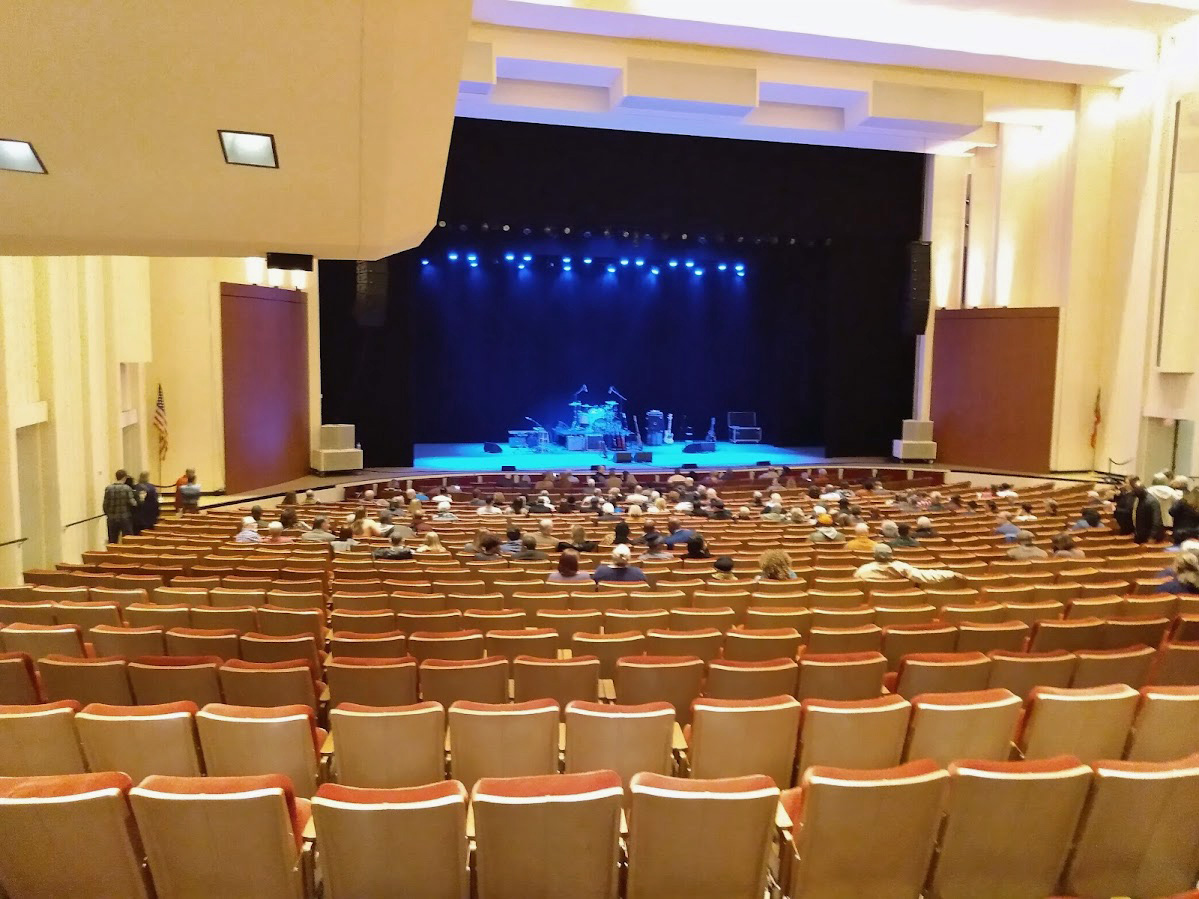
Inside

Atlanta Symphony Hall is a concert hall serving as home venue to the Atlanta Symphony Orchestra. It is located within the Woodruff Arts Center at 1280 Peachtree Street in Atlanta, Georgia, United States. In addition to the symphony orchestra, it also hosts concerts by the Atlanta Pops Orchestra and sometimes pop/rock recording artists.

The venue has a total capacity of 1,762 seats on three levels: 1,074 in the orchestra section, 349 in the lower balcony and 339 in the upper balcony. There are also spaces for 12 wheelchairs and 12 companion seats, as well as 82 additional seats in the orchestra pit, depending on the stage set-up. The first Atlanta Symphony Orchestra recording (a Robert Shaw Christmas album) was made there in 1975. Some improvements to seating and air conditioning were approved in advance of the 1996 Summer Olympics in Atlanta.

Not known for its acoustic excellence, a newer hall in a different location (Atlanta Symphony Center) was proposed in the early 2005, but this project was later abandoned, due to a lack of funding. However, there are plans in place to renovate the existing hall in order to bring it up to standard.

The hall also offers wireless audio aids for audience members who are hearing impaired.

== See also ==
- The proposed Atlanta Symphony Center
