= Opus Place =

No. 2 Opus Place
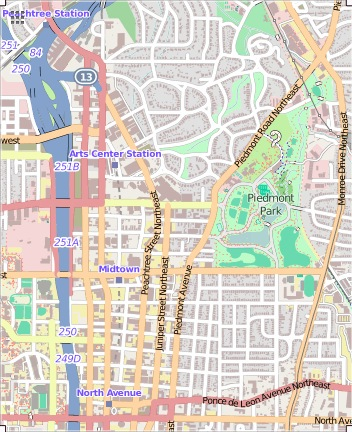
- Location within Atlanta Midtown Location within Atlanta Location within Georgia Location within the United States
- Former names: 98 14th Street

General information
- Status: Under construction
- Location: 98 14th Street, Atlanta, Georgia, United States
- Coordinates: 33°47′13″N 84°23′9″W
- Groundbreaking: December 14, 2017
- Owner: Olympia Heights Management

Design and construction
- Architecture firm: Perkins and Will

Opus Place is a cancelled development in Atlanta, Georgia, United States. Located in Midtown Atlanta, the development was currently expected to consist of a large residential high-rise, called No. 2 Opus Place, and possibly a smaller tower. Upon its completion, No. 2 Opus Place would be among the tallest buildings in Atlanta and the tallest residential building in the city. The project was first developed in 2014, but underwent a significant alteration in 2016.

== History ==
In February 2014, a group of New York City-based developers proposed a large construction project in Midtown Atlanta that would consist of three skyscrapers across from the Four Seasons Hotel Atlanta, on what had formerly been the site for the proposed Atlanta Symphony Center. An attorney for the developers said Bernardo Fort Brescia and his architectural firm Arquitectonica would serve as designers for the project, which would include 1,300 residential units, 90,000 square feet (8,400 m^{2}) of retail space, and over 300 hotel rooms. In May 2014, the 4-acre (1.6-hectare) site was purchased from the Woodruff Arts Center for a reported $22 million. At this time, the project was known as 98 14th Street, and it was expected to be constructed in phases and completed by 2020. The tallest of the three skyscrapers would be 720 feet (220 m), just 3 feet (0.91 m) shorter than the Westin Peachtree Plaza Hotel, making it the sixth-tallest building in the city.

In July 2016, Olympia Heights Management (OHM, which had been one of the original developers for the project) and architectural firm Perkins and Will presented radically altered plans for the site. As now envisioned, the project would consist of two skyscrapers, the larger of which would be 920 feet (280 m), making it the second-tallest skyscraper in the city. The first phase would see the creation of this taller skyscraper, with an expected completion some time in 2019. The developers at this time announced that construction would begin by the end of the year. In October 2016, permits were filed for construction to begin at the site, with construction costs for the first tower estimated at over $300 million. The next month, the project was renamed Opus Place, with the first tower called No. 2 Opus Place. In early 2017, the overall height of the tower was reduced from 74 to 53 stories after a hotel pulled out of the project. Even with the height reduction, the building would still have been the tallest residential building in the city, topping out at 730 feet (220 m). In March 2017, developers announced that construction would start in October that year, with architect Richard Meier creating the building's master plan. Prices for residences in the building were announced at being between $700,000 and $12 million, with prices averaging around $1.6 million. While initially scheduled for October, the development held its official groundbreaking ceremony on December 14, 2017. By April 2018, the building had sold nearly 20% of its available residences.

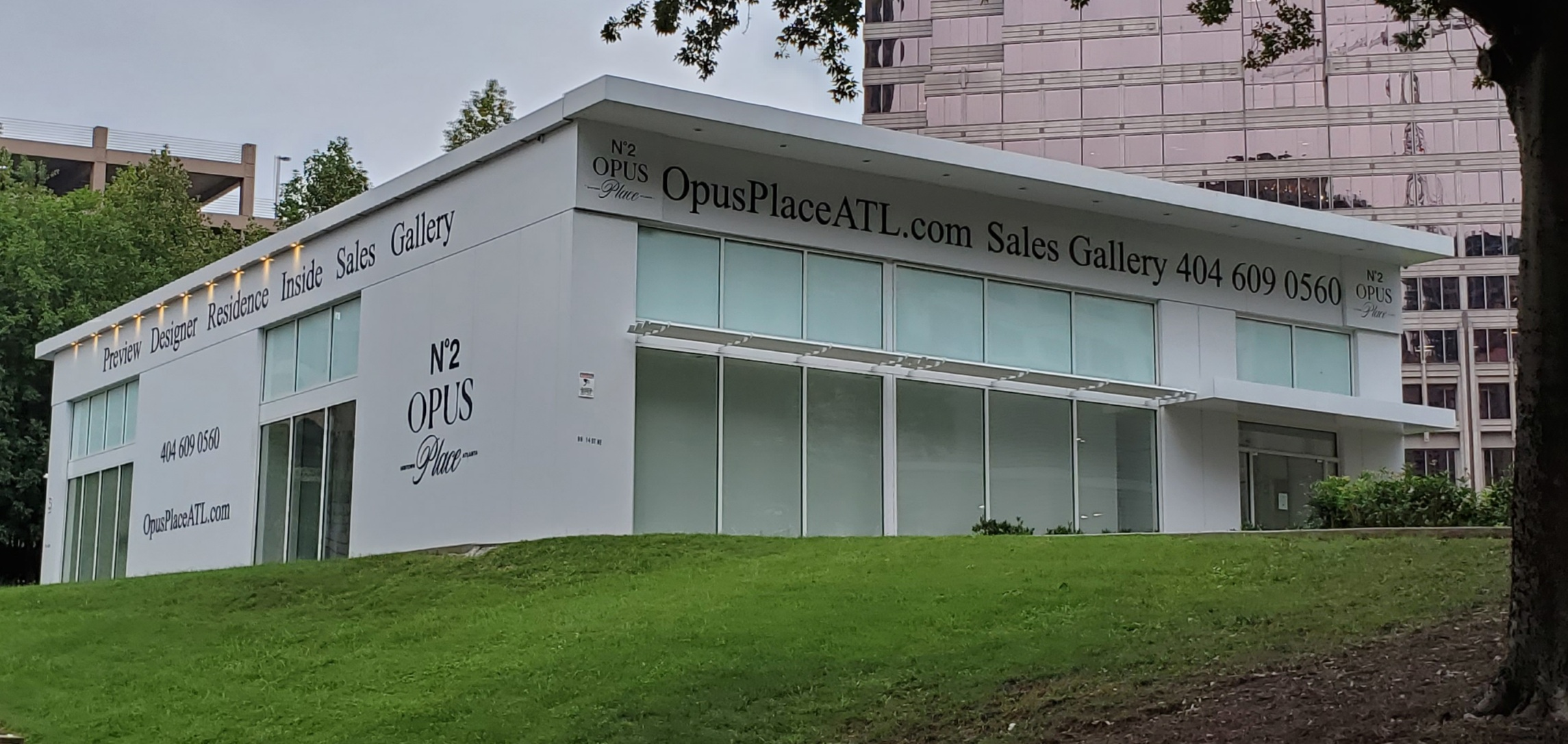
Sales gallery for No. 2 Opus Place (2020)

In May 2018, developers projected that, following grading and excavation at the site, construction of the tower itself would "start full force" by September or October of that year, with completion by mid-2020. However, by October, construction was projected to start in early 2019, with completion in early 2021. That same month, developers announced a change in plans that would see 214,000 square feet (19,900 m^{2}) of office space occupying the bottom 17 floors of the building. In August 2019, developers again altered the construction schedule, claiming that construction would commence in November of that year, top out in January 2022, and open that October. In January 2020, OHM announced that they would be selling about 2.2 acres (0.89 hectares) of the land surrounding No. 2 Opus Place with the real estate firm Cushman & Wakefield, leading to further questions regarding the future of the project.

It was announced in October 2023 that Newport, the real estate developers behind the Opus Place development, had been foreclosed upon by its lender, BridgeInvest. A month later in November, the property was sold at auction to an undisclosed buyer.

As of July 2024, the sales gallery stands, but no development has occurred. The fate of the land is unclear.

As of March 2025, The Midtown Improvement District (MID) Board of Directors has announced the pending acquisition of the four-acre land site at 98 14th Street. Announcement Here
