= North Avenue station (MARTA) =

MARTA rail station

N3 North Avenue
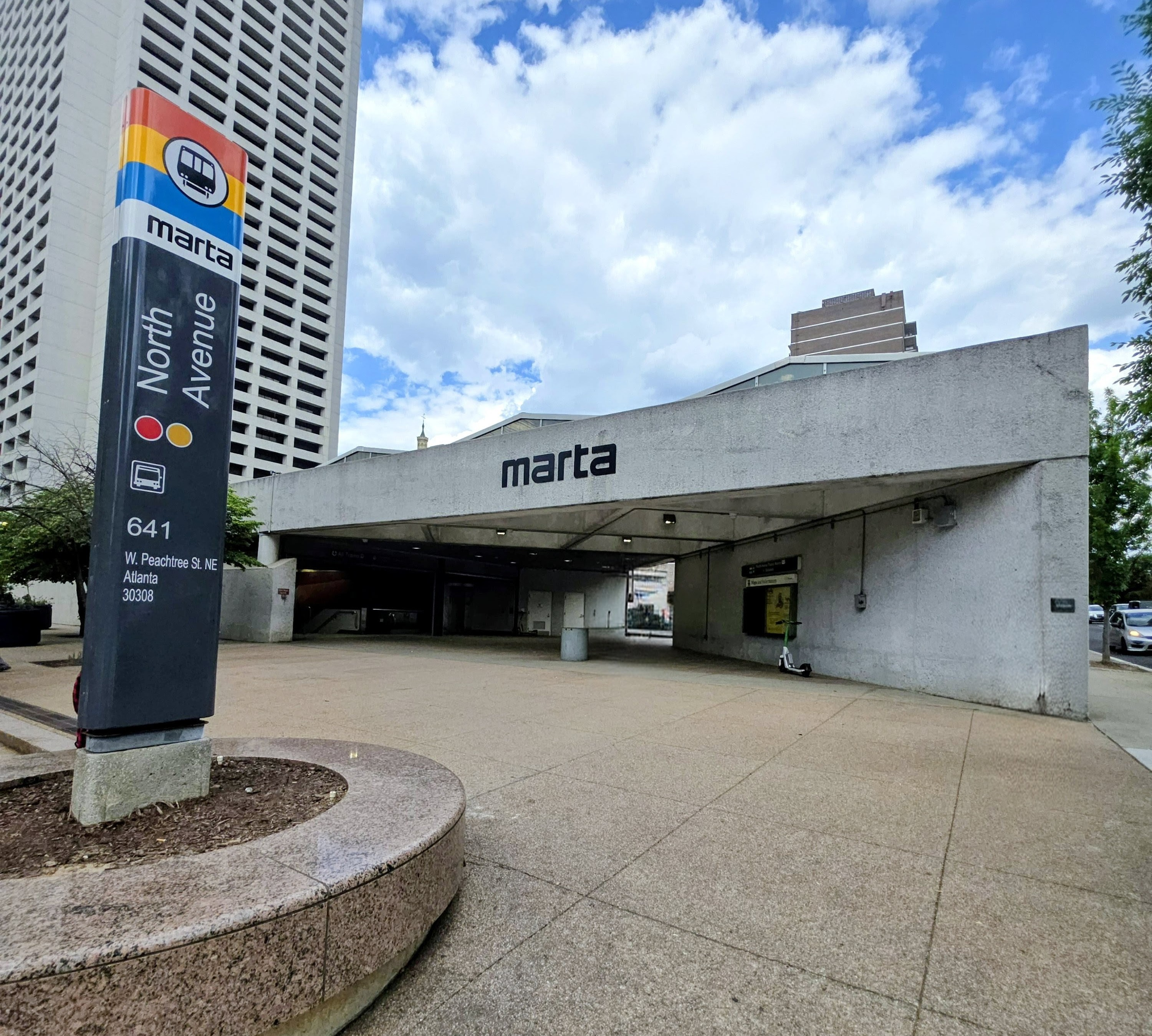
- North Avenue in 2026

General information
- Location: 713 West Peachtree Street NW; Atlanta, Georgia 30308
- Coordinates: 33.771712°N 84.386699°W
- Platforms: 2 side platforms
- Tracks: 2
- Connections: MARTA Bus: 2, 50, 51, 102, 899; CobbLinc; Ride Gwinnett; GRTA

Construction
- Structure type: Underground
- Accessible: Yes
- Architect: Henri Jova

Other information
- Station code: N3

History
- Opened: December 4, 1981; 44 years ago

Passengers
- 2013: 5,045 (avg. weekday) 0%

Services
Preceding station	MARTA	Following station
Civic Center toward Airport	Red Line	Midtown toward North Springs
Civic Center toward Airport	Gold Line	Midtown toward Doraville
Location

North Avenue is an underground subway station in southern Midtown Atlanta, GA, serving the Red and Gold lines of the Metropolitan Atlanta Rapid Transit Authority (MARTA) rail system. The station is named after the nearby North Avenue. The walls are made of white tile and painted with a mural of green hills, a blue sky, and clouds. The murals were designed by Gordon Anderson while he was a Professor of Art at Georgia State University. It is among the busiest stations in the system with an average of 15,000 boardings per weekday. The station has a direct entrance to Tower Square and is actually located in the skyscraper's basement.

It provides access to the Baltimore Block, Bank of America Plaza, Center for the Visually Impaired, Bobby Dodd Stadium, Emory University Hospital Midtown, Georgia Institute of Technology, Shakespeare Tavern, The Varsity, Rufus M. Rose House, The Fox Theatre, and the Georgian Terrace Hotel. It also provides connecting bus service to The Carter Center, the communities of Edgewood and Inman Park, Fulton County Sheriffs Headquarters and Jail, Coca-Cola headquarters, Bauder College, Fernbank Museum of Natural History, Piedmont Park and Ferst Center for the Arts.

== Station layout ==
G	Street Level	Entrance/Exit, station house
M	Mezzanine	Fare barriers, entrance to Tower Square and 3rd Street
P Platform level	Side platform, doors will open on the right
P Platform level	Southbound	← Red Line, Gold Line toward Airport (Civic Center)
P Platform level	Northbound	Gold Line toward Doraville (Midtown) → Red Line toward North Springs (Midtown) →
P Platform level	Side platform, doors will open on the right

== Bus routes ==
The station is served by the following MARTA bus routes:

- Route 2 - Ponce De Leon Avenue / Druid Hills
- Route 50 - Donald Lee Hollowell Parkway
- Route 51 - Joseph E. Boone Boulevard
- Route 102 - North Avenue / Little Five Points
- Route 899 - Old Fourth Ward

== Connection to other transit systems ==
- CobbLinc
- Ride Gwinnett
- Georgia Regional Transportation Authority
