= Atlanta Symphony Center =

Proposed concert hall in Atlanta, Georgia

Coordinates: 33°47′12.98″N 84°23′10.45″W

Symphony Center was a proposed concert hall in Atlanta, Georgia that would have been the new home of the Atlanta Symphony Orchestra. The site for the new structure was to be in Midtown on 14th Street just south of the current Symphony Hall in the Woodruff Arts Center. Architect Santiago Calatrava was selected to design the facility and delivered a design that would serve as a "postcard" for the city. The design was unveiled in 2005, but was cancelled in 2008 due to funding issues. The ASO now plans to build a new hall at the Woodruff Arts Center, at 15th Street and Peachtree Street.

In May 2014, the Woodruff Arts Center sold the property to a group of New York City-based developers, and it is currently the site of the Opus Place development.

As of March 2025, The Midtown Improvement District (MID) Board of Directors has announced the pending acquisition of the four-acre land site at 98 14th Street. Announcement Here

== See also ==
- List of concert halls
