= William Breman Jewish Heritage & Holocaust Museum =

The Breman
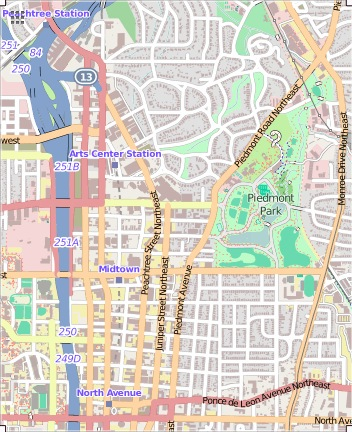
- Location within Atlanta William Breman Jewish Heritage & Holocaust Museum (Atlanta) William Breman Jewish Heritage & Holocaust Museum (Georgia) William Breman Jewish Heritage & Holocaust Museum (the United States)
- Former name: The Breman Museum, William Breman Jewish Heritage Museum
- Established: 1996
- Location: 1440 Spring Street NW, Atlanta, United States
- Coordinates: 33.793955°N 84.388626°W
- Type: Holocaust museum Jewish Museum
- Director: Leslie Gordon
- Public transit access: Arts Center
- Website: www.thebreman.org

The William Breman Jewish Heritage Museum, colloquially known as The Breman, is a cultural center in Atlanta dedicated to Jewish history, culture and arts with special emphasis on Georgia and the Holocaust. The Breman, which opened in 1996, is the largest museum of its kind in the Southeast, and it is located at the corner of 18th Street and Spring Street, across the street from the Center for Puppetry Arts, in Midtown. The museum is named for Atlanta businessman William Breman, a philanthropist active in the Jewish community of Atlanta.

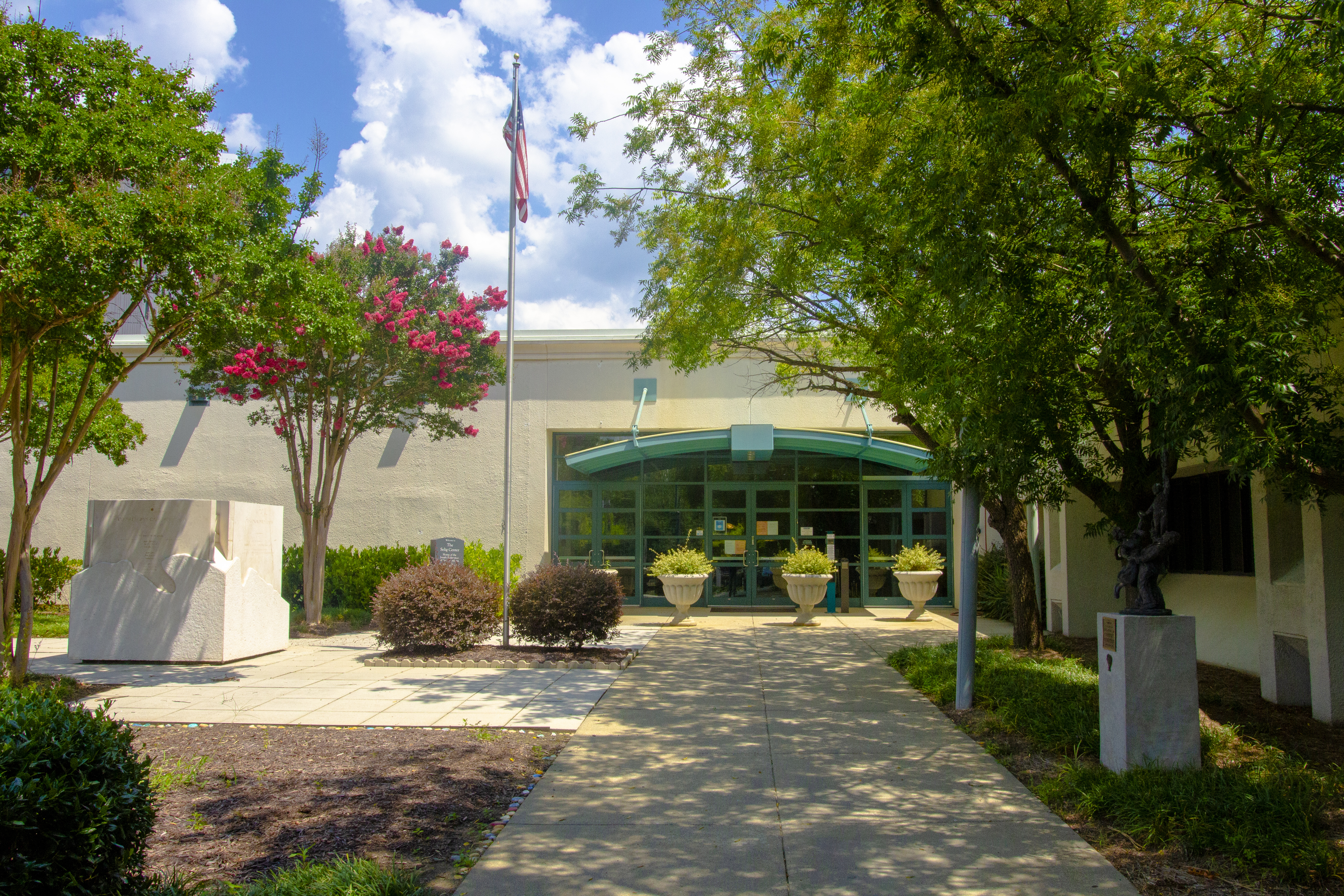
The Breman Museum connects all people to Jewish history, culture and arts.

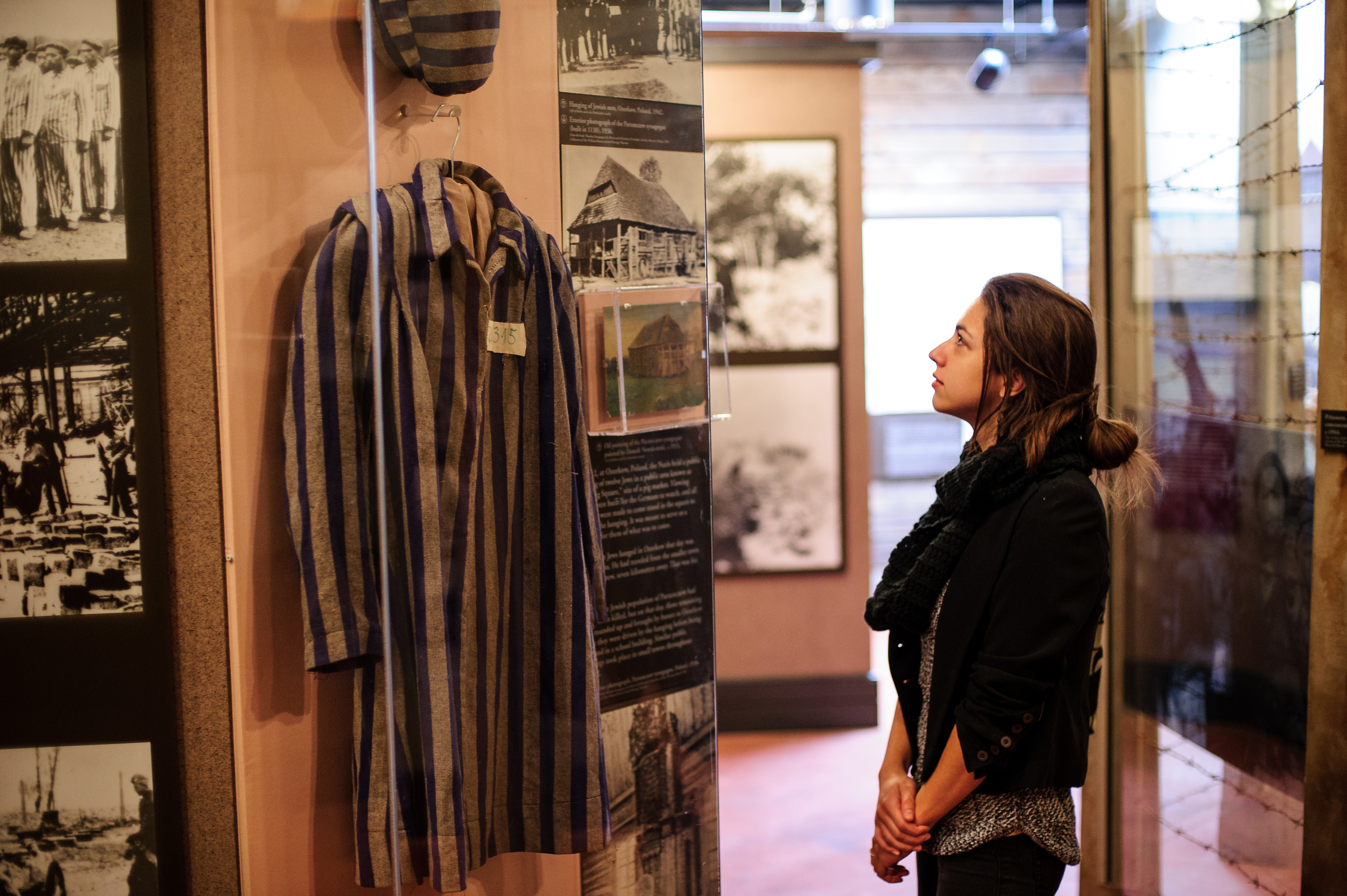
Visitor in Holocaust Exhibition at The Breman Museum.

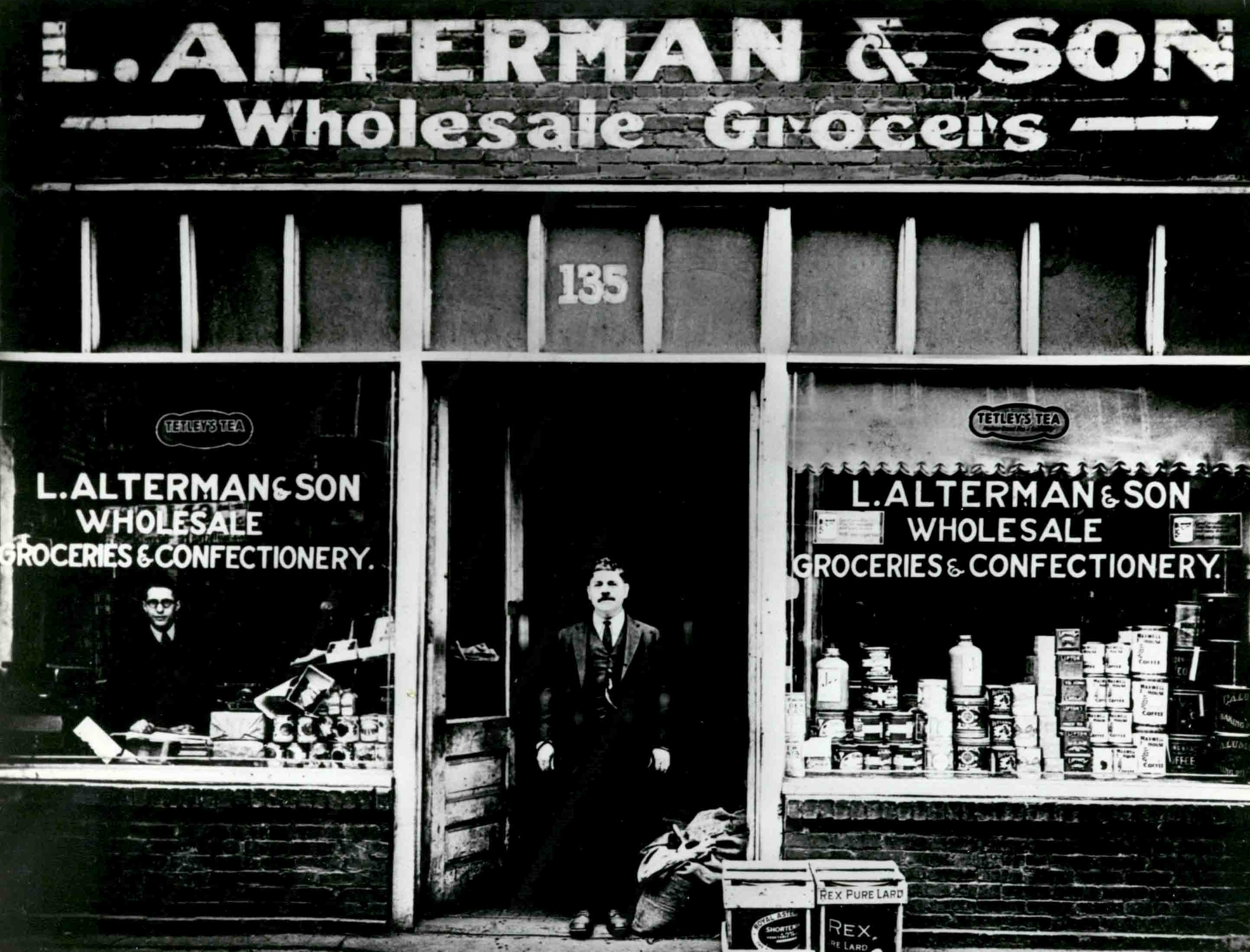
The Ida Pearle and Joseph Cuba Archives for Southern Jewish History at The Breman Museum has over 50,000 photographs, documents, oral histories and objects representing Southern Jewish History. The largest collection of its kind.

== Exhibitions ==
The museum has several exhibitions, permanent and traveling, which educate visitors about Jewish values, customs and traditions. Through multimedia works such as film, music, and visual arts, exhibits explore universal themes, such as personal responsibility, community building, and cross-cultural understanding.

The museum's permanent exhibition is Absence of Humanity: The Holocaust Years, 1933-1945.

Past exhibitions have featured words and pictures by Maurice Sendak, author of Where the Wild Things Are, an exploration of the Golden Age of Comic Books, 1938–1950, and the story of Rich's department store, Return to Rich's: The Story Behind The Store.

== Research and collections ==
Also housed at the Breman Museum are the Ida Pearle and Joseph Cuba Archives for Southern Jewish History, Savannah Jewish Archives, and Genealogy center, documenting the history of Jewish life in Georgia and the Southeast. This particular collection has personal stories and historical memorabilia. The museum has an extensive exhibition pertaining to the struggles the Jewish people endured in Poland, Germany, Czechoslovakia, and Greece before and during the Holocaust. It also tells the stories of how Holocaust survivors came to the southeast and created new lives for themselves. Also featured are oral history interviews with Holocaust survivors.
