= Mega Mart =

South Korean supermarket chain

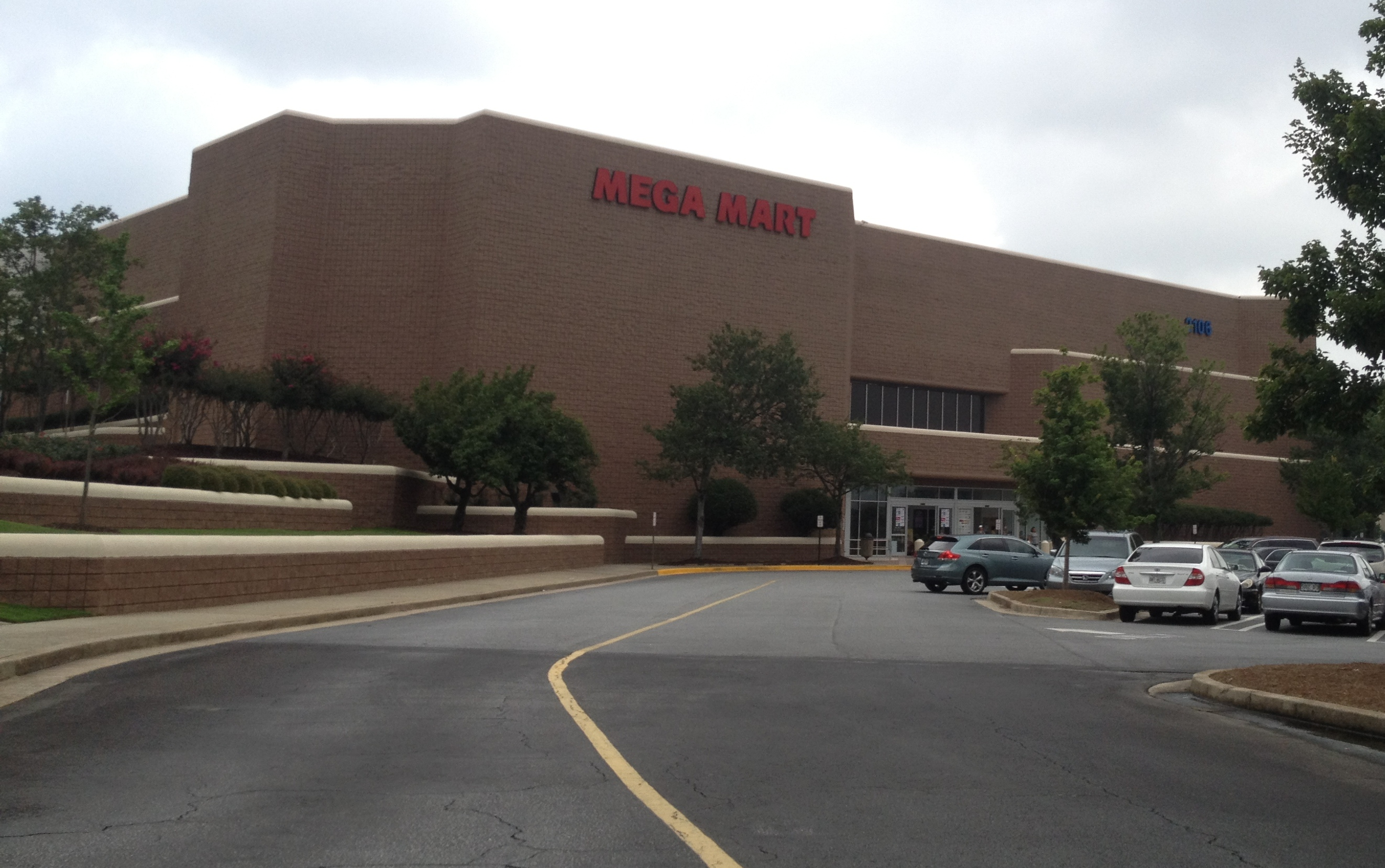
Gwinnett Place Mall, Duluth, Georgia

Mega Mart (Korean: 메가마트) is a Korean supermarket based out of South Korea. The first location opened in Busan, South Korea in 1995 and as of 2025, they operate 14 stores in South Korea. In 2010, they expanded into the United States with a location at the Gwinnett Place Mall outside of Atlanta, Georgia. Today, Mega Mart operates four stores under the Mega Mart label in the United States, located in Duluth, Georgia, Fremont, California, Sunnyvale, California and East Palo Alto, California, with a planned openings in Dublin, California.

Jagalchi (Daly City), a wholly-owned subsidiary of Mega Mart, opened a large Korean food complex in Daly City, occupying the former 75,000-square-foot JCPenney space. It features a seafood and butcher counter, a bakery, and Pogu, a restaurant led by a Michelin-starred chef. The market offers a wide selection of Korean products, including traditional pickled banchan and ready-to-eat meals from the temple food section.
