= Gwinnett Place Transit Center =

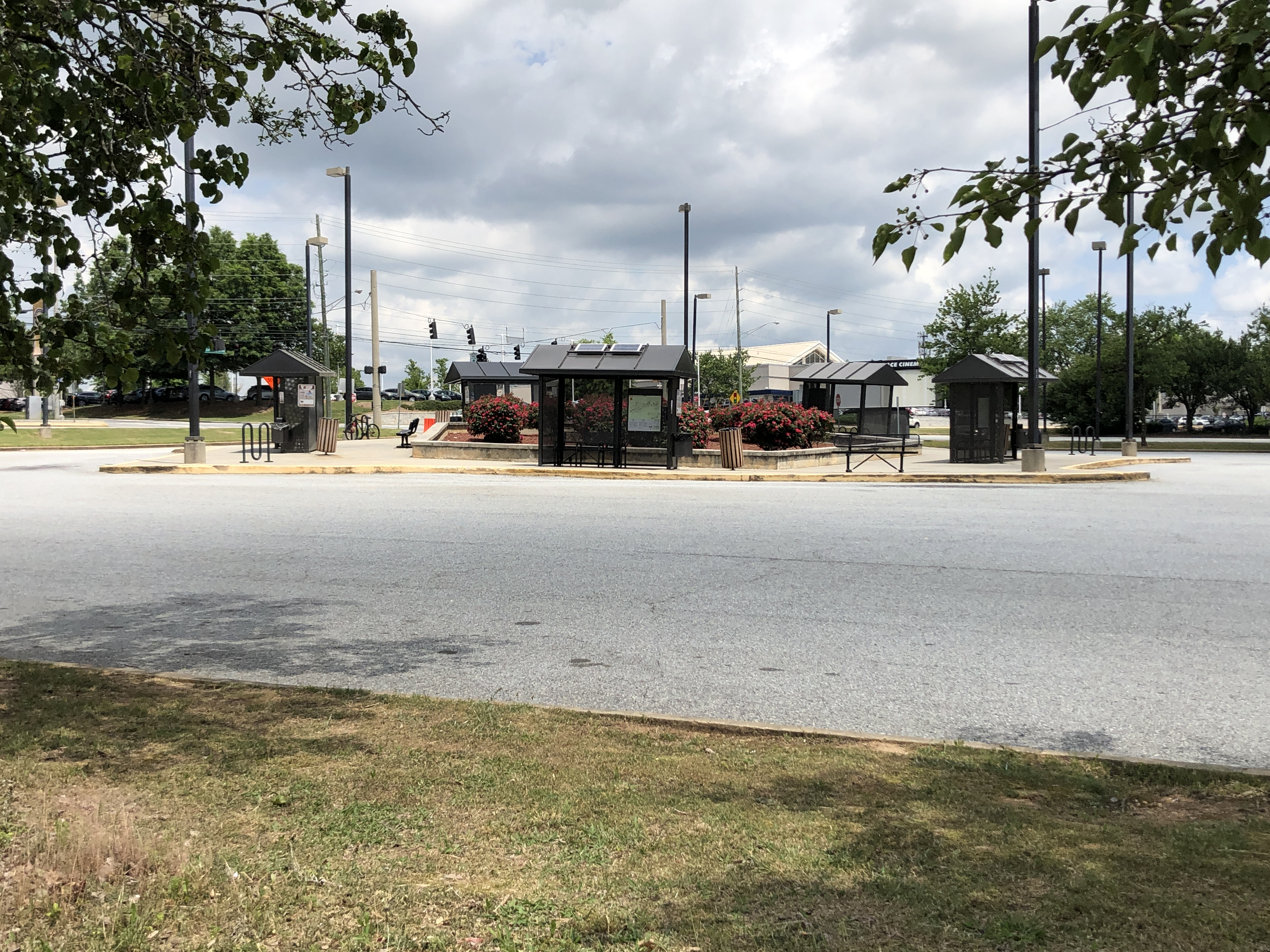
- Gwinnett Place Transit Center in 2019

General information
- Location: Duluth, Georgia 30096
- Coordinates: 33°57′47″N 84°07′52.5″W
- System: Ride Gwinnett
- Owner: Gwinnett County

Construction
- Structure type: Partially-covered pavilion

History
- Opened: 2000
Location

The Gwinnett Place Transit Center (also Ride Gwinnett Center) is a regional bus station and a major stop for Ride Gwinnett buses in Gwinnett County, Georgia, United States. The terminal contains a seating area and is in close proximity to the Gwinnett Place & Sugarloaf business districts.

== Bus services ==
- 30: Connecting Duluth to Lilburn via South Berkely Road to Gwinnett Transit Center via Indian Trail - Lilburn Road. This portion is one-way only and is known as the "Lilburn Loop." It runs Burns to Pleasant Hill to Lawrenceville Highway to Rockbridge to Dickens back to Indian Trail-Lilburn Road. Frequency is 30 minutes peak to 60 minutes off peak.
- 40: Connecting Gwinnett Transit Center to the City of Lawrenceville via Old Norcross Rd. Atkison Road "Gwinnett Tech" through Old Norcross and Historic Downtown Lawrenceville and through portions which are only One-Way Sugarloaf Parkway. Frequency is 30 minutes peak to 60 minutes off peak.

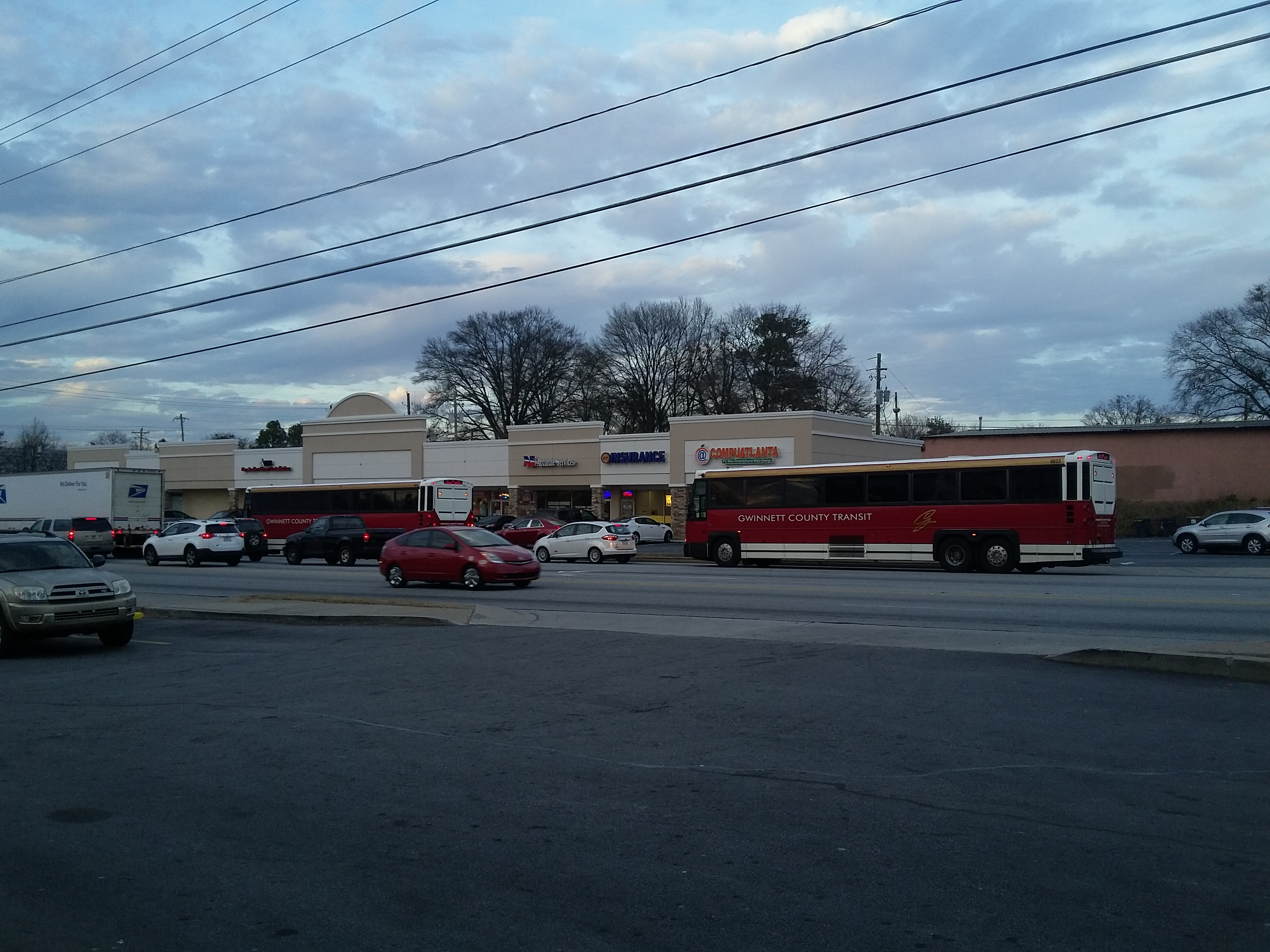
2 MCI D4500CL Express Buses on Beaver Ruin Road in Norcross, Georgia.

== Future expansion ==
In 2017, Gwinnett Commissioners purchased additional property adjacent to the transit center for future expansion plans.
