= CobbLinc =

Bus public transit system in Cobb County, Georgia, United States

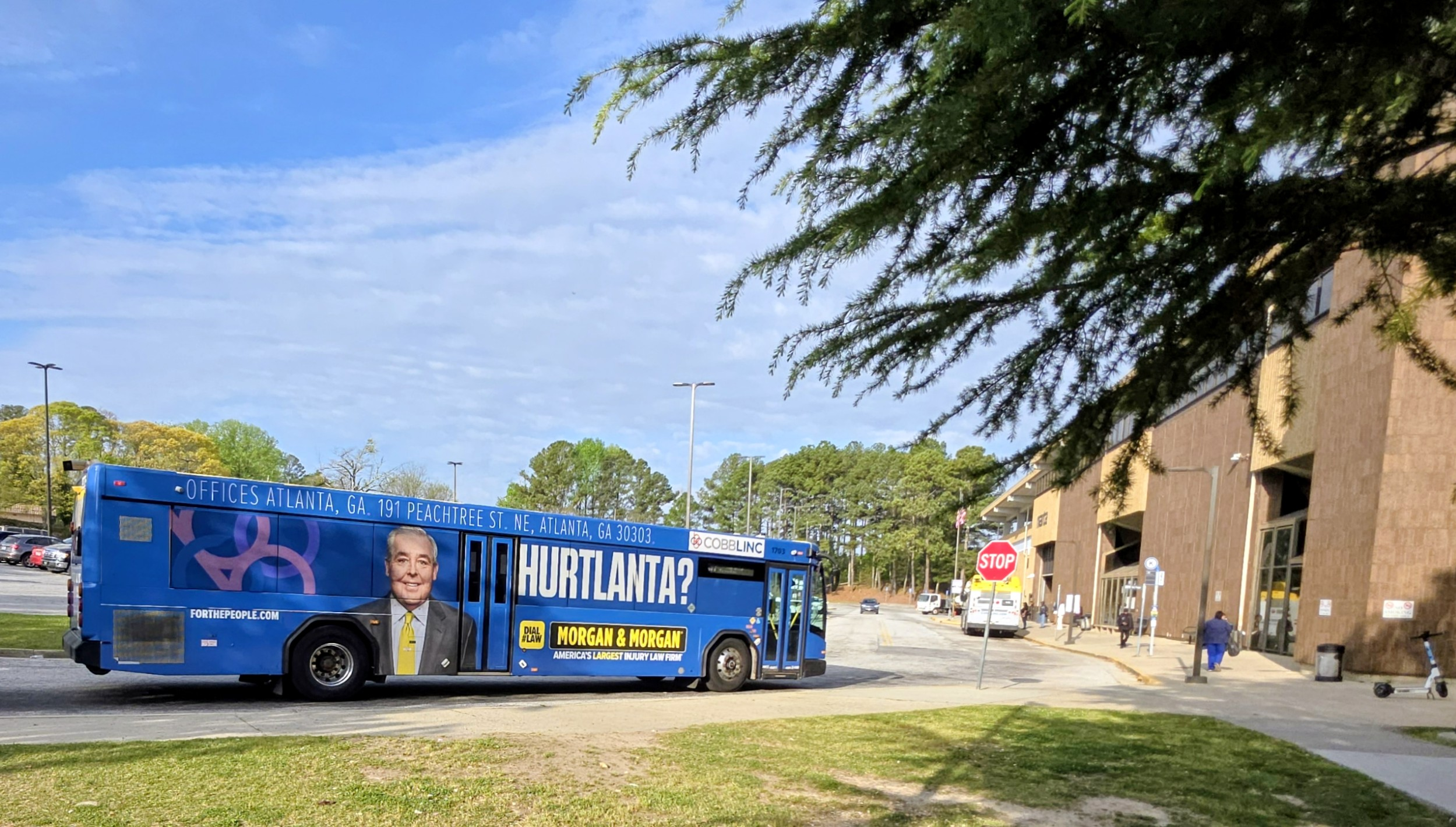
- Cobblinc route 30 outside of Hamilton E Holmes station
- Founded: July 1989
- Headquarters: 463 Commerce Park Dr. Marietta, Georgia
- Service area: Cobb County (some stops in Fulton)
- Service type: transit bus, paratransit, express bus service
- Routes: 17
- Annual ridership: 1,989,499 (2025)
- Fuel type: compressed natural gas; diesel
- Operator: Cobb County
- Website: www.cobblinc.org

CobbLinc (formerly Cobb Community Transit) is the bus public transit system in Cobb County, Georgia, one of metro Atlanta's three most populous suburban counties. Formed in July 1989 as Cobb Community Transit, CobbLinc operates a network of bus routes, on-demand transit, and paratransit. In 2025, the system had a ridership of 1,989,499.

== History ==
Along with Gwinnett, Cobb County voted against joining MARTA in 1971, and thus was left out of the system. In 1985, Cobb County began working with the Atlanta Regional Commission to study the feasibility of operating a transit system in the county. Local funding for the bus system was narrowly approved by a special referendum in 1987. The system began operations as Cobb Community Transit (CCT) on June 10, 1989. The initial system had five local routes and one commuter route to Arts Center station on the MARTA rail network.

CCT was very successful in its first year, carrying four times as many riders as projected. In 1999, business leaders approved funding to study a light rail line from the Cumberland Mall area to the Town Center area. In May 2010, Cobb's Board of Commissioners approved further funding to plan the line, which would be approximately 14.5 miles (23.3 km) long with seven stations. A cross-suburb line over to Gwinnett County has also been proposed, intersecting with a future extended MARTA north line between Roswell and Sandy Springs in Fulton County.

Cobb began operating GRTA Xpress bus service in 2005.

The Board of Commissioners approved the rebranding of CCT to CobbLinc in September 2015, with the first buses with the new branding being delivered in 2016. In 2024, Cobb County put a referendum for an $11 billion Special-purpose local-option sales tax to fund "rapid" bus routes, new transit centers, and a county-wide microtransit system. However, the referendum failed with 62% of voters opposing the tax.

== Operation ==
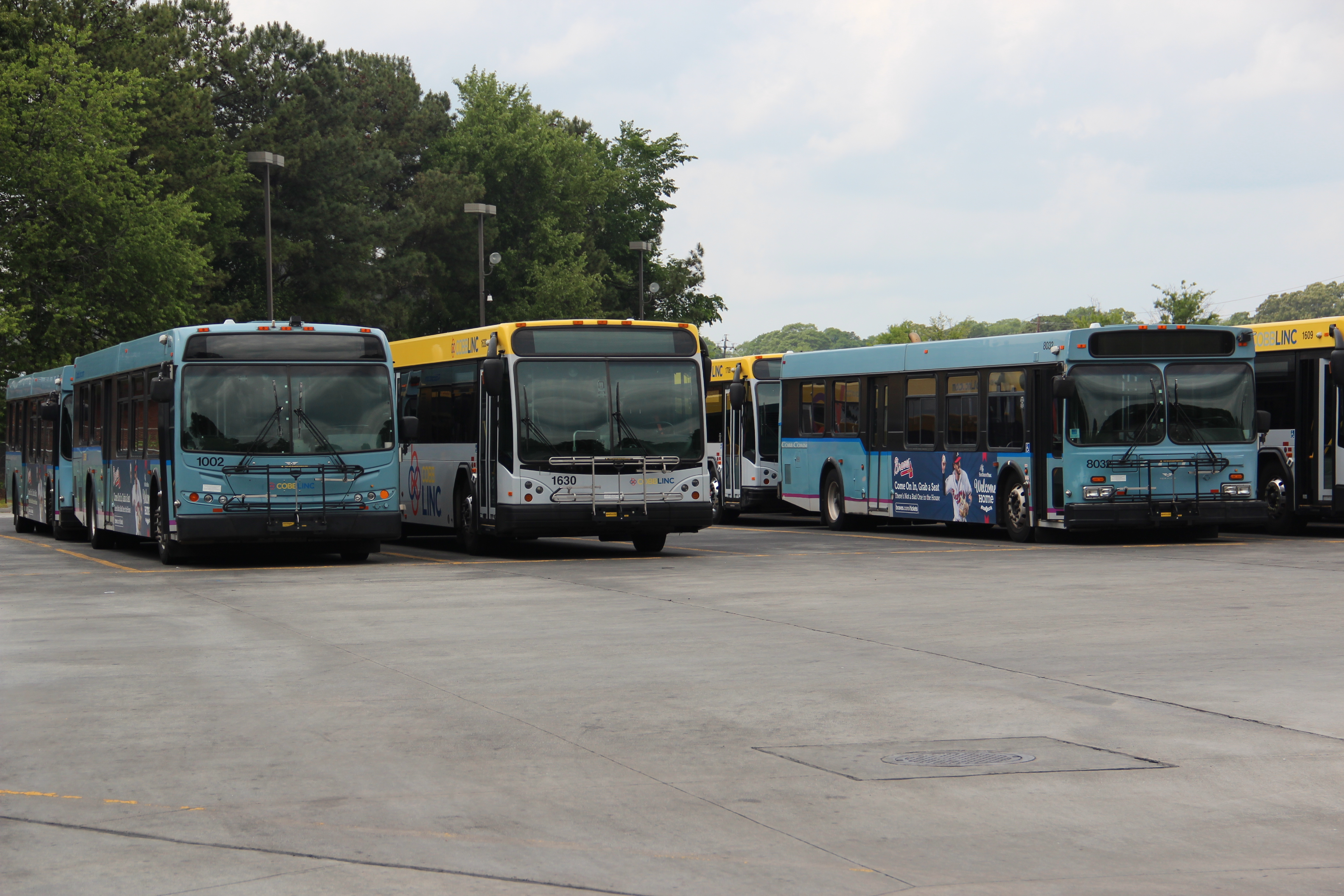
CobbLinc buses at the Marietta Transfer Center

CobbLinc has two hubs. Marietta Transfer Center is along South Marietta Parkway in Marietta, just west of the former Southern Polytechnic State University now the Marietta campus of Kennesaw State University. The second hub, Cumberland Transfer Center, is located adjacent to Cumberland Mall. Routes connect to the most populated areas of the county, including Mableton and Kennesaw. Express routes also operate down to Atlanta, connecting with MARTA at Arts Center station. Transfers are free between MARTA and CobbLinc, though both transit agencies charge the same fare ($2.50) with a Breeze Card. CobbLinc's annual operating budget is about $12.9 million (2004), from fares and the general county budget, as well as Federal grants.

All buses make automatic announcements inside the bus of upcoming stops and major roads, and stop requests from passengers. External announcements are also made by voice, in addition to the normal electronic signs. Some buses also run on compressed natural gas rather than diesel. Buses are maintained at the CobbLinc operations center, which is located on the same site as the Marietta Transfer Center.

== Services ==
Most bus routes begin and end at the Marietta Transfer Center, though several operate from the Cumberland Boulevard Transfer Center.

=== Routes ===
Route	Terminals			Major streets traveled	Service notes
Circulator Blue	Cumberland Cumberland Transfer Center	↺	Cumberland Loop	Counterclockwise Loop: Cumberland Boulevard, Cobb Galleria Parkway, Akers Mill Road, Cobb Parkway, Circle 75 Parkway, Windy Ridge Parkway	Fare free
Rapid 10	Kennesaw Kennesaw State University	↔	Midtown Atlanta Arts Center station	I-75, Cobb Parkway	
10	Marietta Marietta Transfer Center	↔	Midtown Atlanta Arts Center station	Cobb Parkway, I-75	
15	Marietta Marietta Transfer Center	↔	Cumberland Cumberland Transfer Center	Roswell Street, Powder Springs Street, Windy Hill Road, Circle 75 Parkway	
20	Marietta Marietta Transfer Center	↔	Cumberland Cumberland Transfer Center	South Cobb Drive, Cumberland Parkway	
25	Cumberland Cumberland Transfer Center	↔	Adamsville Hamilton E. Holmes station	Spring Road, Maxham Road, Old Alabama Road, I-20	
30	Marietta Marietta Transfer Center	↔	Adamsville Hamilton E. Holmes station	Austell Road, Floyd Road, I-20	
40	Kennesaw Kennesaw State University	↔	Marietta Marietta Transfer Center	Busbee Drive, Bells Ferry Road, Church Street/Cherokee Street, Roswell Street	
45	Kennesaw Kennesaw State University	↔	Marietta Marietta Transfer Center	Ernest Barrett Parkway, Cobb Parkway, Fairgrounds Street	
50	Marietta Marietta Transfer Center	↔	Cumberland Cumberland Transfer Center	Franklin Gateway, Delk Road, Powers Ferry Road, Akers Mill Road	

=== CobbLinc Go ===
CobbLinc Go is an on-demand transit service available in Austell and Powder Springs. The pilot service launched in November 2024 and is operated by Via Transportation using vans.

== See also ==
- Ride Gwinnett – Bus public transit system in Gwinnett County, Georgia, United States
- C-TRAN (Georgia) – Bus public transit system in Clayton County, Georgia, United States (2001-2010)
