= Ride Gwinnett =

Bus public transit system in Gwinnett County, Georgia, United States

- Founded: 2000
- Headquarters: 466 West Crogan St, Suite 410 Lawrenceville, GA 30046
- Service area: Gwinnett County
- Service type: Local bus, paratransit, and microtransit
- Routes: 12
- Hubs: Gwinnett Place Transit Center; Indian Trail Park & Ride; I-985 Park & Ride; Sugarloaf Mills Park & Ride
- Stations: Doraville station Indian Creek station
- Fleet: (43) MCI D4500, (38) Gillig Low Floor, Ford Transit Connect Vans
- Daily ridership: About 5000 rides per day in 2016
- Fuel type: Diesel
- Operator: Transdev
- Website: www.ridegwinnett.com

Ride Gwinnett (formerly known as Gwinnett County Transit or GCT prior to 2023) is the bus public transit system in Gwinnett County, Georgia, United States, one of metro Atlanta's three most populous suburban counties. It was formed in 2000, with express buses starting in November 2001 and local buses in November 2002.

Routes connect to the most populated areas of the county, including Norcross and Lawrenceville. Xpress services are available to Atlanta, connecting with MARTA at the Doraville, Civic Center, and Five Points stations. Transfers are free between MARTA and Ride Gwinnett, with use of a Breeze Card or ticket.

== History ==
Along with Cobb, Gwinnett voted against joining MARTA in 1971 and thus was left out of the system. In 1987, the Gwinnett County Commission began studying the construction of a privately-run commuter rail line to ease traffic. However, in 1989, the plan was revised to utilize buses instead. Bus service began on November 5, 2001. The Gwinnett Place Community Improvement District and MARTA were seeking alternative, such as light rail to Gwinnett through the Gwinnett Place area.

In 2015, Gwinnett County Transit was investigated for overcharging some patrons of the GRTA Xpress bus routes who used Breeze Cards to pay. GRTA acknowledged the issue and advised patrons to purchase multiple Breeze Cards (one for each type of bus or rail fare) to pay transit fares and record transfers between the GRTA, CobbLinc, and MARTA transit systems.

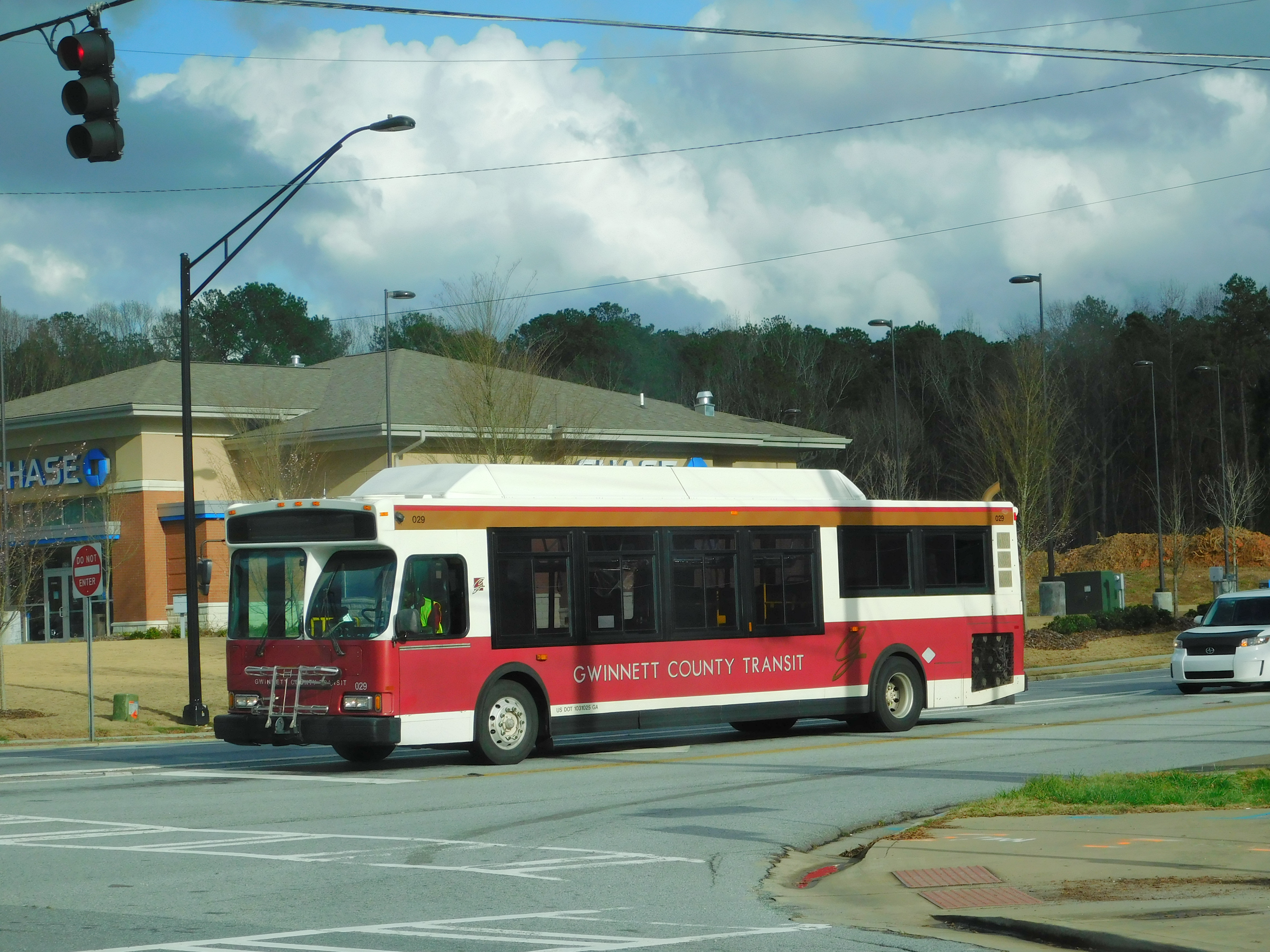
A route 35 GCT bus in 2015

In September 2018, MARTA's board of directors and the Gwinnett County Board of Commissioners gave conditional approval to an agreement which would see the county to contract with MARTA for the operations of the service. This included county designed and built projects, significantly expanding bus service in the county and clearing the way for a long-sought-after extension of MARTA's rail system into the county from its current terminus at Doraville station. However, the county referendum for the contract with MARTA and one-cent sales tax to fund the projects failed on March 19, 2019.

In July 2020, the Gwinnett County Board of Commissioners called for another transit referendum, this time through the House Bill 930/ATL mechanism. Projects would have been designed, built and operated all by Gwinnett County. The referendum failed on the November ballot with a final vote total of 198,514 for yes and 199,527 voting no.

In January 2023, Gwinnett County Transit officially changed its name to Ride Gwinnett.

In September 2023, Gwinnett County Board of Commissioners unanimously approved a new transit plan which focused heavily on microtransit zones, simpler local routes, and direct airport rides. This plan notably does not include any rail components or MARTA expansion into the county. On June 4, 2024, the Gwinnett County Board of Commissioners approved, 4-1, another transit referendum to be placed on the ballot for the November 5, 2024 General Election. It would impose a one percent sales tax for 30 years, funding up to 75 projects from the 2023 transit plan, and would shift all existing operational expenses off of property taxes onto the new sales tax. The referendum failed to pass 47-53%.

== Operation ==
Ride Gwinnett allows payment via Breeze Cards, tickets & passes, the Breeze Mobile 2.0 app, cash/card with fareboxes equipped on all buses, and the Ride Gwinnett app for paratransit users.

== Routes ==
Ride Gwinnett has 9 local bus routes. Gwinnett Place Transit Center is a transfer point for local routes; 10A/10B, 25, 30, and 40.

Route	Terminals			Major streets traveled	Service notes
10A	Doraville Doraville station	↔	Lawrenceville Sugarloaf Mills Park and Ride	Buford Highway, Satellite Boulevard	Trips alternate between running via Buford Highway/North Berkeley Lake Road (10B) or Beaver Ruin Road/Satellite Boulevard (10A)
10B	Doraville Doraville station	↔	Lawrenceville Sugarloaf Mills Park and Ride	Buford Highway, Satellite Boulevard	Trips alternate between running via Buford Highway/North Berkeley Lake Road (10B) or Beaver Ruin Road/Satellite Boulevard (10A)
20	Doraville Doraville station	↔	Norcross Beaver Ruin Road & Price Place	New Peachtree Road, Button Gwinnett Drive, Brook Hollow Parkway, Graves Road, Singleton Road, Indian Trail-Lilburn Road	
25	Stone Mountain Rockbridge Road @ Stonebridge	↔	Duluth Gwinnett Transit Center	Five Forks Trickum Road, Killian Hill Road, Pleasant Hill Road	Weekdays only
30	Gwinnett Village Live Oak Parkway & Thompson Parkway	↔	Duluth Gwinnett Transit Center	Jimmy Carter Boulevard, Lawrenceville Highway, Burns Road, Shackleford Road	
35	Doraville Doraville station	↔	Norcross Peachtree Parkway @ The Forum	New Peachtree Road, Best Friend Road, Jimmy Carter Boulevard	
40	Duluth Gwinnett Transit Center	↔	Lawrenceville Sugarloaf Parkway & Five Forks Trickum Road	Old Norcross Road	
45	Lawrenceville Sugarloaf Mills Park and Ride	↔	Lawrenceville Gwinnett Medical Resource Center	Atkinson Road, Lakes Parkway, Collins Hill Road	
50	Lawrenceville Sugarloaf Mills Park and Ride	↔	Lawrenceville Old Peachtree Road @ Publix	Satellite Boulevard, Buford Highway, North Brown Road	
70	DeKalb County Indian Creek station	↔	Snellville Wisteria Drive @ Main Street	Memorial Drive, US-78 Stone Mountain Freeway	

== Incidents ==
- On June 11, 2024, a Gwinnett County Transit bus was hijacked in downtown Atlanta by 39-year-old Joseph Grier, leading to a fatal, high-speed chase. Grier shot and killed a passenger, before forcing the driver to drive toward DeKalb County with 17 people on board. The incident ended when police immobilized the bus in Stone Mountain.
