= C-TRAN (Georgia) =

Bus public transit system in Clayton County, Georgia, United States (2001-2010)

Clayton County C-TRAN
- Founded: 2000
- Ceased operation: 2010
- Headquarters: Jonesboro, Georgia
- Service area: Clayton County
- Service type: Local and Express Bus Routes
- Alliance: MARTA and GRTA Xpress
- Routes: 8
- Fleet: 24 Orion VII Buses and 6 ParaTransit Vehicles
- Fuel type: compressed natural gas
- Operator: MARTA
- Website: C-Tran schedule

The Clayton County C-TRAN was a bus transportation system in Clayton County, Georgia, USA, that ran from 2001 to 2010. C-Tran was run by the Georgia Regional Transportation Authority (GRTA) to manage the local bus system, linking bus routes to MARTA, the Hartsfield-Jackson Atlanta International Airport, and major commercial and academic centers in the county. C-Tran's bus fleet was powered by compressed natural gas. Due to budget shortfalls, C-Tran ended service on March 31, 2010.

== History ==
A bus service system was first proposed by the Clayton County Board of Commissioners and approved by the voters of the county in July 2000. On February 14, 2001, the Board of Commissioners entered into a contract for the GRTA to run the bus service. In April 2001, the GRTA Board of Directors agreed to purchase the first 12 buses. Two initial routes began on October 1, 2001, with one additional route becoming operational in February 2003.

- July 2001: GRTA signed a contract with MARTA to provide operating personnel and facilities for the Clayton County bus system.
- August 2001: Resolution 2001-79 passed by Clayton County Commissioners, naming the new Clayton County Transportation System the "C-TRAN" system (Clayton Transit).
- October 2001: Route 501 and Route 503 became operational under MARTA management.
- February 2003: Route 504 became operational.
- June 2004: First Transit began operation of C-Tran service after a competitive RFP bidding process managed by GRTA.
- October 2, 2007: MARTA began operating Clayton County's C-TRAN bus and paratransit service (for the second time) this week as part of a 3-year joint agreement between the agencies to improve transit service in the region. Under the agreement, MARTA will operate and maintain C-TRAN's fleet of twenty-four buses and six paratransit vehicles and will be fully reimbursed by the county for all expenses.
- August 2008: C-tran added the Breeze system to all of its buses following CCT and MARTA additions
- March 2010: C-Tran ended all bus services

=== Termination of service ===
On October 13, 2009, the board voted 4–1 to terminate its contract with MARTA, which runs C-Tran. The system had cost about $10 million per year to operate while collecting $2.5 million in farebox revenue. A previous bill was to go before the Legislature would have allocated some of MARTA's sales tax revenue to Clayton County and would have restored C-TRAN service. C-Tran ended service on March 31, 2010. On November 2, 2010, a non-binding referendum voted in favor of joining MARTA, 70–30. However, the Clayton County Board Members must vote and approve of the MARTA System in Clayton County, before service is provided. Clayton County Board Members approved the 1% Sales Tax on July 5, 2014. On November 4, 2014, Clayton County residents approved the 1% Sales Tax to join MARTA. Limited MARTA bus service became effective on March 21, 2015. Full bus service is expected to be effective by Fall 2016.

Buses in C-Tran livery are expected to be repainted into mainline MARTA livery; before the shutdown, MARTA and Xpress GA had been granted a controlling interest in the fleet.

Your South Side Transportation, a privately owned transportation service, began servicing 503 and 504 routes, the two busiest lines on C-TRAN, on April 1, 2010. The company was granted an emergency permit to run so people who normally ride the bus could have a bridge to get to work without feeling the stress of looking for transportation. The company originally charged $3.00 per trip, now it costs $5.00 to ride. Your South Side Transportation currently operates two passenger vans.

In addition to Your South Side Transportation, a multitude of "companies" have appeared. Most of these "companies" do not have a valid license, oftentimes a decal sticker is simply attached to the side of the vehicle they operate. Just as Your South Side Transportation now charges $5.00, most of these "companies" charge $5.00 as well. A number of patrons depend on these unofficial "companies." The companies include: Total Grace Transportation, All Around Transportation, On Point Transportation, Joshua's Transportation, Miss K's Transportation, and many more.

On August 2, 2010, a privately run service called Quick Transit started service on former C-Tran routes. Quick Transit covered former C-Tran Routes 501, 502, 503 and 504. Quick Transit fares were $2.00 higher than former C-Tran fares. One-way fare was $3.50, with no free transfers to MARTA. The operators of Quick Transit implemented service along the former C-Tran routes 501 and 502. On July 1, 2011, Quick Transit ceased operations citing low ridership and high gas prices.

== Bus information ==
=== Routes ===
- 440 Tara Boulevard Express
- 441 Jonesboro Express
- 442 Riverdale Express

=== Route Addendum ===
The following routes are part of GRTA XPRESS.

- 440 Tara Boulevard Express
- 441 Jonesboro Express
- 442 Riverdale Express

=== Major areas served ===
- Jonesboro
- Morrow
- Forest Park
- Lake City
- Riverdale
- Activity centers such as:
  - Southlake Mall (Morrow, GA)
  - Clayton State University
  - Southern Regional Medical Center
  - Fort Gillem
  - Clayton County Justice Center

=== Budget ===
The initial three-year estimated budget, including startup capital and operating costs, totals $30.7 million with 80% of the funding coming from Federal sources, 10% from the state, and the other 10% from non-property Clayton County tax funds.

== Garage ==
All C-TRAN buses were housed and fueled at MARTA's Laredo Garage under MARTA's first management contract, 2001 - 2004. Beginning in 2004, C-TRAN buses were housed and fueled at a facility located on Southlake Parkway in Jonesboro. This site was secured by First Transit when the company took over the operation in June 2004. MARTA subsequently used this same facility for its second iteration of C-TRAN management during the period of 2007 - 2010.
