= Gwinnett Place Mall =

Defunct mall in Duluth, Georgia, U.S.

Gwinnett Place
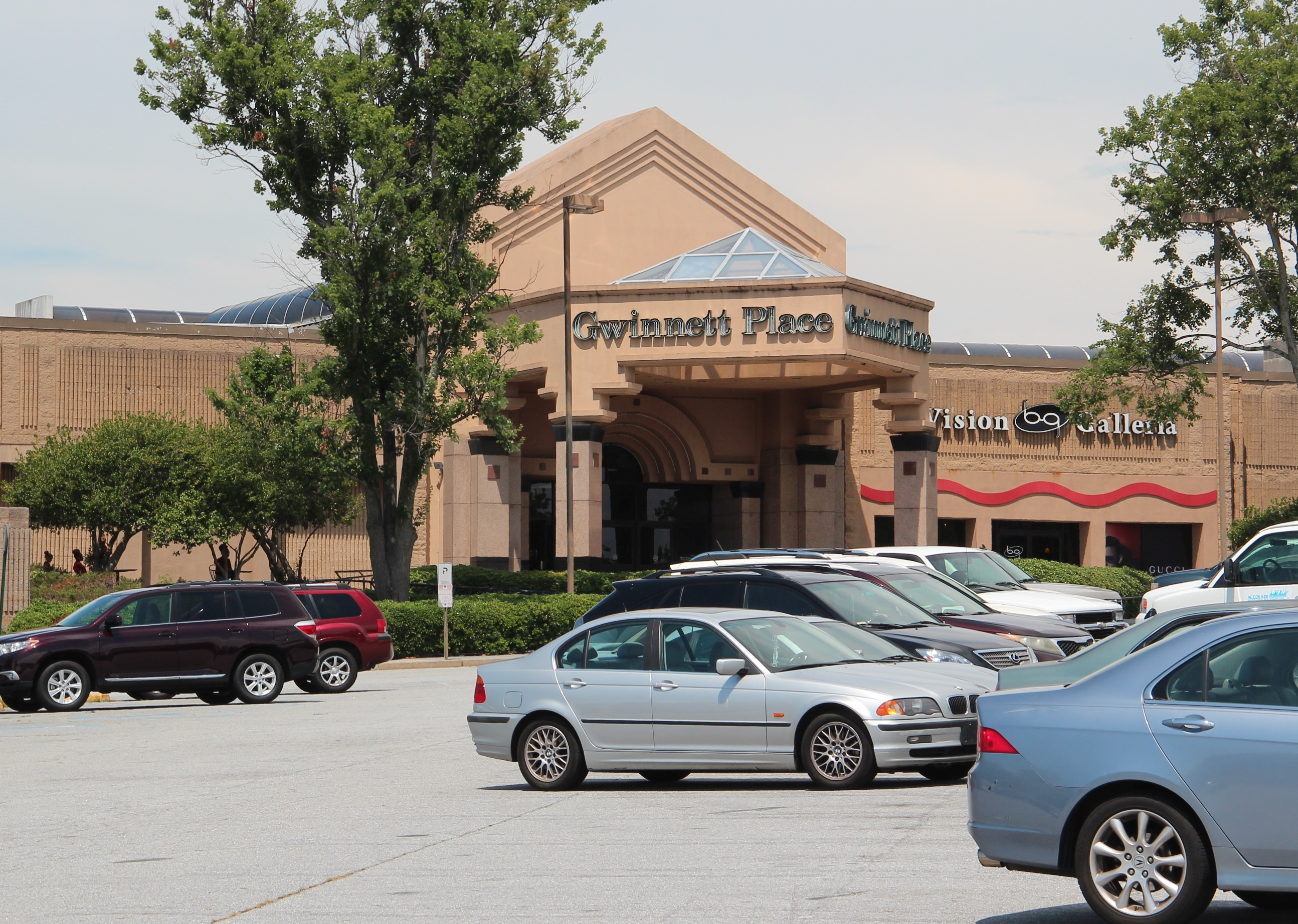
- Gwinnett Place Mall in July 2016
- Location: Duluth, Georgia, United States
- Coordinates: 33.9606°N 84.126°W 33.961216, -84.126236
- Opened: February 1, 1984; 42 years ago
- Closed: April 2021; 5 years ago
- Developer: Cadillac Fairview Corporation and Melvin Simon & Associates
- Manager: Gwinnett County, Georgia
- Owner: Urban Redevelopment Agency of Gwinnett County
- Num. of stores: 2
- Num. of anchor tenants: 2 (5 at peak)
- Floor area: 1,278,000 sq ft (118,700 m^{2})
- Floors: 2
- Public transit: Gwinnett Transit Center

Gwinnett Place Mall is a defunct shopping mall located in the Pleasant Hill Road corridor of Duluth, Georgia, in the United States. Once the leading mall in the region, it declined in the face of competition from newer malls nearby such as Mall of Georgia in Buford and Sugarloaf Mills in Lawrenceville. It is owned by Gwinnett County, which released plans to redevelop the property in 2023.

The establishment was used as the filming location for Starcourt Mall, the main setting of the third season of the Netflix series Stranger Things.

== History ==
Construction of Gwinnett Place Mall began on January 21, 1982, and it officially opened its doors on February 1, 1984, with anchor tenants Rich's, Davison's and Sears. Mervyn's joined the lineup in 1986, and Davison's transitioned to Macy's (after briefly operating as Davison’s-Macy’s in 1985). In 1993, Parisian became a new anchor, leading to the addition of a northwest wing. After Mervyn's closed all seven of its Atlanta locations, J. C. Penney took over its space in 1997. By 2003, Macy's and Rich's merged to create Rich's-Macy's, a name that remained until 2005 when it was rebranded as Macy's. This left the mall with two Macy's locations, prompting the closure of the former Davidson's store. In 2007, Parisian rebranded as Belk, which eventually closed in 2013. In 2010, the first Mega Mart (a Korean supermarket) in the US opened in the former Davidson's anchor space.

The mall was challenged by the openings of the Mall of Georgia in 1999 and Sugarloaf Mills in 2001, and lost a large part of its customer base. The mall also failed to attract any new anchor stores for several years. The Gwinnett Place Cinemas just outside the mall closed in late September 2000 as General Cinema began winding down operations in Georgia ahead of its October bankruptcy. In 2008, Gwinnett Technical College opened an International Education Center in the mall.

The downturn of the mall throughout the early 2010s led to the mall’s owner, Simon Property Group, losing the mall to foreclosure in 2013, where it was acquired by Moonbeam Capital Investments LLC. JCPenney closed on April 4, 2015, and Beauty Master purchased the former JCPenney building in March 2016. Beauty Master opened on August 4, 2016. On May 31, 2018, it was announced Sears would shutter as part of a plan to close more stores nationwide.

On December 15, 2020, officials from Gwinnett County's Urban Redevelopment Agency agreed to purchase the 39-acre Gwinnett Place Mall site from Moonbeam Capital Investments LLC for $23 million. At this point, several tenants, including Macy's, Mega Mart and Beauty Master, owned their own property. The sale closed in April 2021 but plans for the site were not disclosed.

On February 28, 2023, the Gwinnett County Board of Commissioners announced a revitalization strategy focusing on housing, mobility and greenspace in response to feedback from the public. The Gwinnett Place Mall Site Revitalization Strategy will take place over the next 20 years.

On September 17, 2024, the Gwinnett County Board of Commissioners purchased Macy’s and the outparcel Macy’s Furniture Store for $16.5 million. This sale closed on December 2, 2024. Both stores closed on March 23, 2025. On September 2, 2025, Gwinnett County announced it would purchase the former Sears anchor for $11.5 million, bringing the total amount of land it owned at the site to 87.5 acres.

== In popular culture ==
The third season of Stranger Things was filmed in the mall in 2018, where it appeared as Starcourt Mall.
