= Woodruff Arts Center =

Performing arts center in Atlanta, Georgia

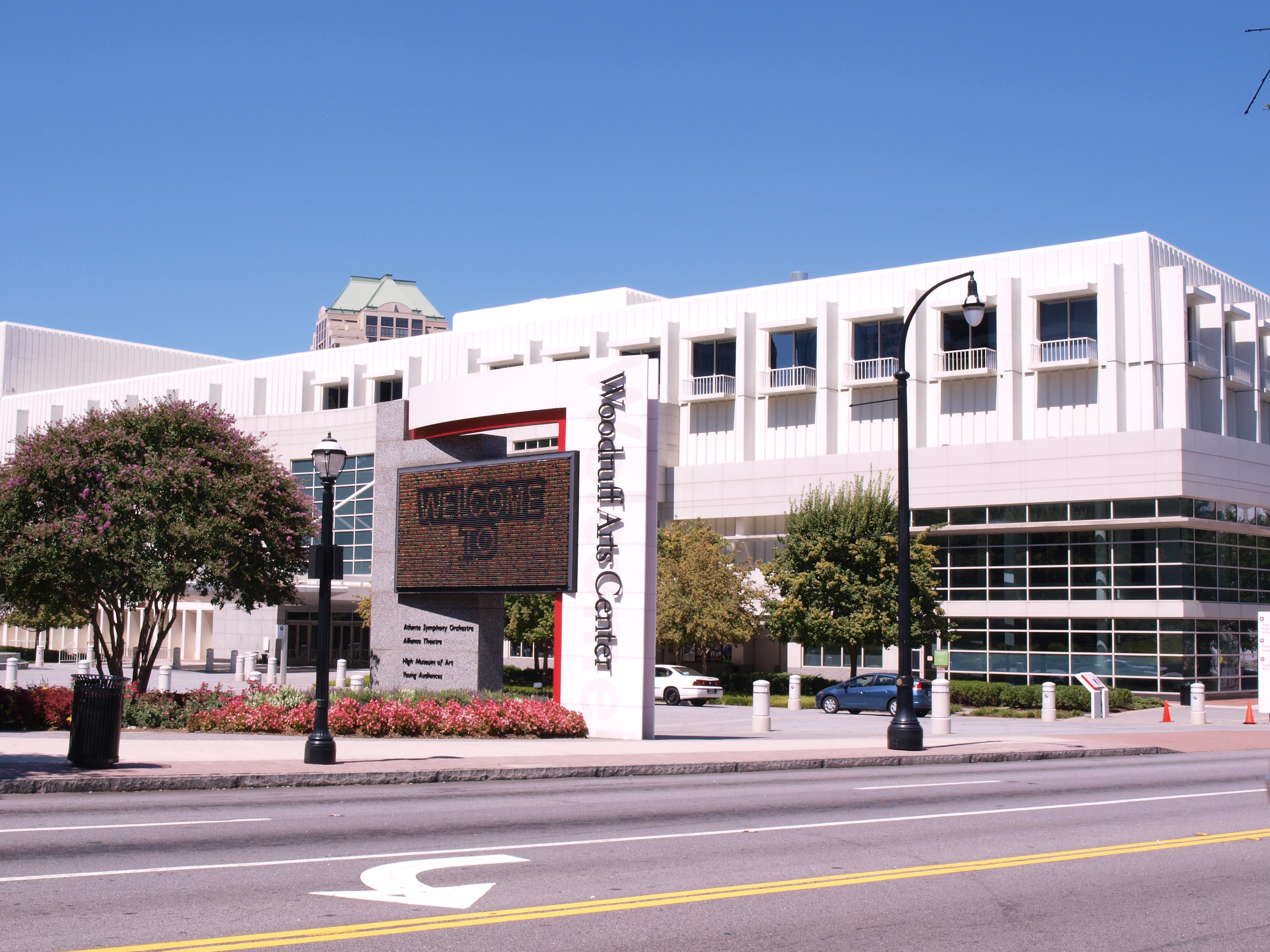

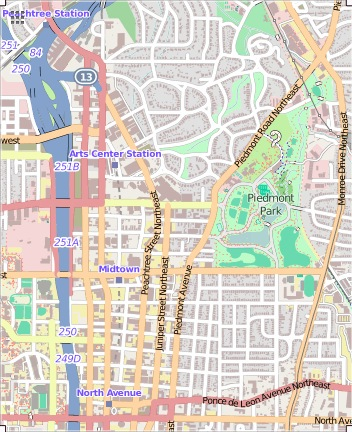
- Location in Midtown Atlanta
- Location: 1280 Peachtree Street; Atlanta
- Coordinates: 33.78925°N 84.38515°W
- Capacity: 1,814 (Atlanta Symphony Hall); 300 (Goizueta Stage for Youth & Families); 203 (Hertz Stage); 653 (The Coca-Cola Stage)
- Public transit: Arts Center station

Construction
- Opened: October 5, 1968

Tenants
- Alliance Theatre, Atlanta Symphony Orchestra, High Museum of Art

Website
- woodruffcenter.org

Woodruff Arts Center is a visual and performing arts center located in Atlanta, Georgia. The center houses three not-for-profit arts divisions on one campus. Opened in 1968, the Woodruff Arts Center is home to the Alliance Theatre, the Atlanta Symphony Orchestra, and the High Museum of Art.

== History ==
In 1962, Atlanta suffered an unprecedented loss when an airplane, the Chateau de Sully, carrying the leaders of Atlanta’s arts and civic community, crashed at Orly Airport in Paris. As the city grieved, it came together and used the devastating loss as a catalyst for the arts and built a fitting memorial to these victims. This led to the creation of the Atlanta Arts Alliance.

The Memorial Arts Center, as the Woodruff was originally known, opened October 5, 1968. The building was designed by Atlanta architect, Joe Amisano. It was renamed the Woodruff Arts Center in 1982 to honor its greatest benefactor, Robert W. Woodruff. The art center also included the Atlanta College of Art, the Atlanta Symphony Orchestra and the High Museum of Art. All three entities were combined into one corporation. The Alliance Theatre was added in 1970 as the fourth division of the Woodruff and 35 years later in 2005, a fifth division was added when Young Audiences joined the center. This addition ensures that the Woodruff’s PreK-12 programs now reach more than one million children annually, the largest base of any arts center in the country.

The Woodruff campus expanded in 1983 with the addition of the Richard Meier-designed High Museum of Art building. This building made Meier the youngest Pritzker Prize-winning architect at that time.

On November 12–13, 2005, the Woodruff introduced its largest expansion since opening in 1968. The new addition features two new exhibit buildings and a new administrative and curatorial building for the High Museum of Art; a residence hall and sculpture studio; a full-service restaurant and public piazza; and a new parking structure. This new "village for the arts" was designed by another Pritzker Prize winner, Italian architect, Renzo Piano.

In August 2025, Michelin-recognized chef Craig Richards opened Elise, a new French-Italian restaurant, on Sifly Piazza across from the main entrance of the High Museum of Art.

In August 2024, the Woodruff Arts Center broke ground on the Goizueta Stage for Youth & Families and the PNC PlaySpace, two new educational performance venues for children. The spaces are scheduled to open in January 2026.

== Layout ==
The Woodruff campus sits on 12.25 acres (4.96 ha) with a planned expansion to 18.25 acres (7.39 ha). Currently, the campus includes 906,000 square feet (84,200 m^{2}) of exhibition, educational and performance space, plus a 200,000-square-foot (20,000 m^{2}) garage located beneath the village.

The Woodruff Arts Center houses the Grammy Award-winning Atlanta Symphony Orchestra, the Tony Award-winning Alliance Theatre, and the High Museum of Art.

== See also ==
- List of concert halls
- List of museums in Georgia (U.S. state)
