= Sugarloaf Mills =

Shopping mall in Gwinnett County, Georgia, U.S.

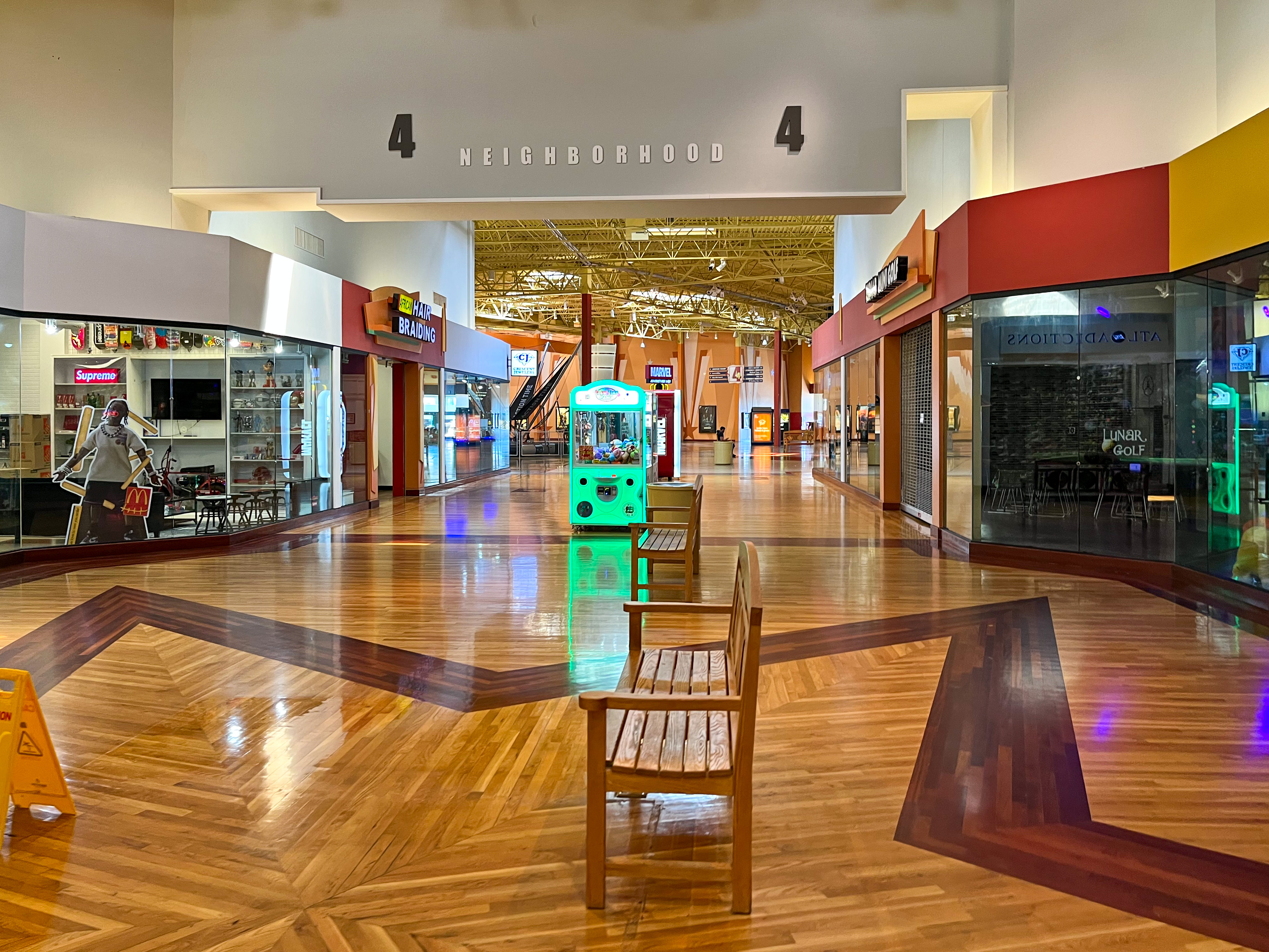
- Neighborhood 4 concourse
- Location: Lawrenceville, Georgia, United States
- Coordinates: 33.9805°N 84.0810°W
- Address: 5900 Sugarloaf Pkwy, 30043
- Opened: November 2, 2001; 25 years ago
- Previous names: Discover Mills (2001–2012)
- Developer: The Mills Corporation; KanAm Group
- Manager: Simon Property Group (under The Mills and Premium Outlets)
- Architect: MSTSD, Inc.
- Num. of stores: approx. 200 (at peak)
- Num. of anchor tenants: 14 (at peak)
- Floor area: 1,183,000 square feet (109,900 m^{2})
- Floors: 1
- Parking: Lighted lot and multi-level parking deck
- Public transit: Sugarloaf Mills Park & Ride
- Website: www.simon.com/mall/sugarloaf-mills

Sugarloaf Mills, formerly Discover Mills, is a super-regional outlet mall in the Atlanta metropolitan area, in Lawrenceville at Gwinnett County, Georgia, near the interchange of Interstate 85 and Highway 316. Opened in 2001, the mall features 14 anchors, 200 specialty retailers at its peak, and a variety of theme restaurants, casual dining, and entertainment venues.

== History ==
=== 1999–2001: Development and opening ===
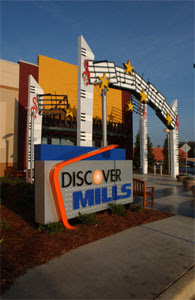
Main entrance when the mall was known as Discover Mills shortly after it opened

The Mills Corporation of Arlington, Virginia began planning Sugarloaf Mills in August 1999 as a joint venture with KanAm on a 230-acre (93 ha) site at Interstate 85 and Sugarloaf Parkway in Gwinnett County, and an initial budget of $170 million. The original (and current) name, Sugarloaf Mills, was named after the mall's planned situation near Sugarloaf Parkway. The site began getting ready for construction in early 2000. 80% of the property was cleared by March. The architect for the mall was local firm MSTSD, Inc., led by Walter Grant Moseley, Jr.

==== Namesake ====
The mall opened on November 2, 2001, with one of its neighborhoods being sponsored by The Coca-Cola Company. From then until 2012, Sugarloaf Mills was named Discover Mills pursuant to a $10 million naming rights partnership with Discover Card. The slogan for the mall was "Where Discover Card is the Smart Choice", and the card was promoted in stores. It was the first shopping mall to have granted naming rights.

=== 2003–2018: Simon Property Group ===
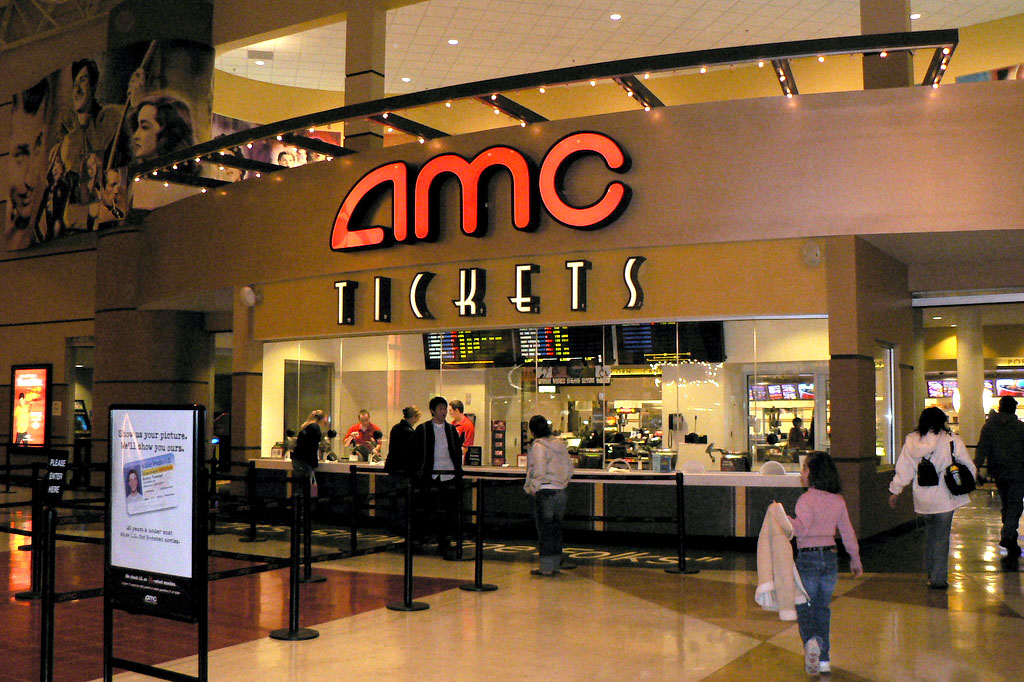
AMC Theatres (December 2006)

Discover Mills became a "shoppertainment" mall following additions of AMC Theatres Discover Mills 18 in December 2003, and Medieval Times in August 2006.

Due to its financial struggles, it was announced in February 2007 that the Mills Corp.'s portfolio, including Discover Mills, would be acquired by the Simon Property Group and Farallon Capital Management for $1.64 billion. The acquisition was completed in April 2007, and the Mills Corporation was rebranded as The Mills: A Simon Company. In November 2009, Dave & Buster's opened at the mall, replacing Jillian's Entertainment.

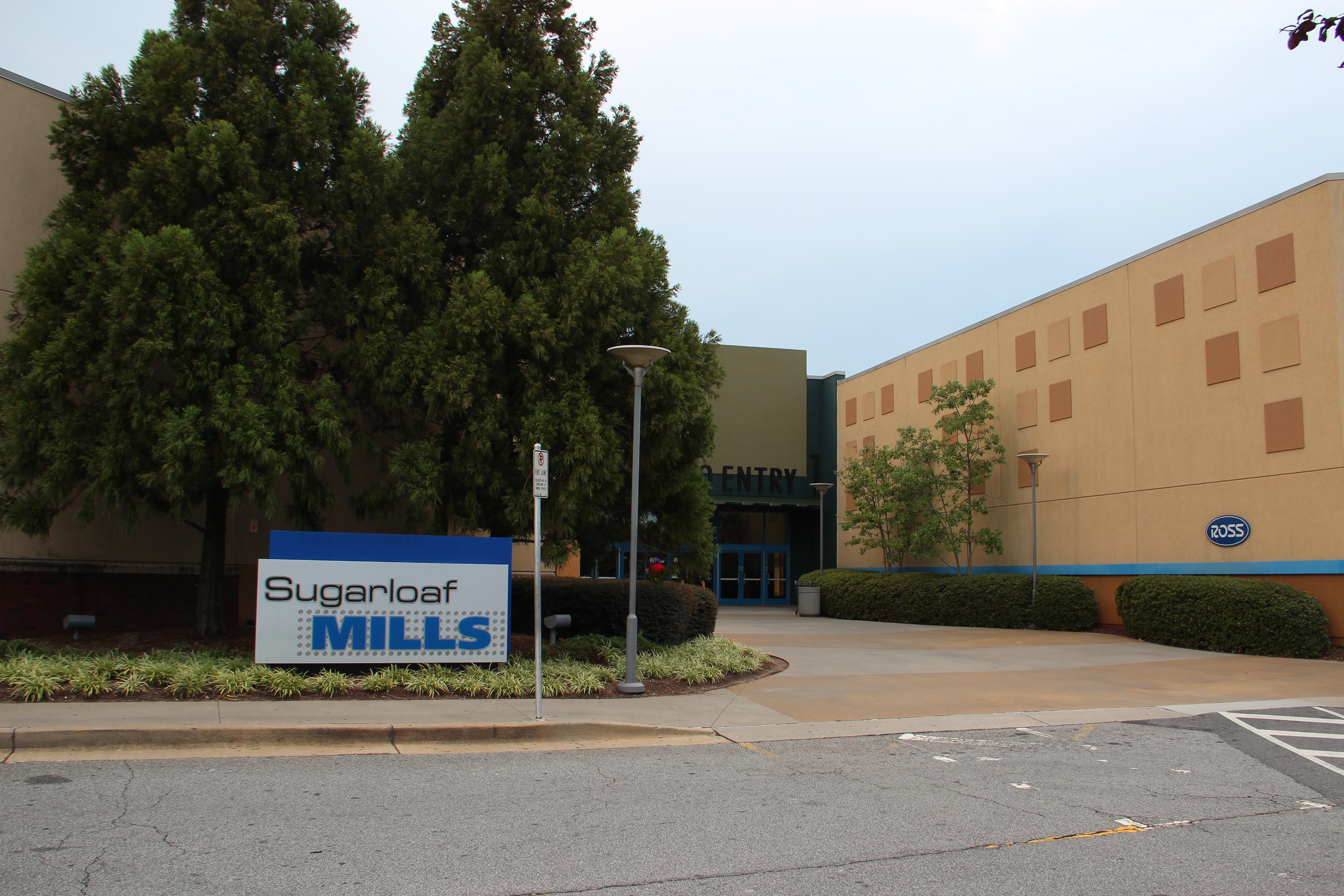
Main entrance (July 2016)

In March 2012, Simon Property Group acquired full control of Discover Mills by buying out Farallon's stake in 26 Landmark Mills malls for $1.5 billion. In October 2012, the naming rights with Discover Card expired, and Simon Property Group reverted the mall to its original planning name, Sugarloaf Mills. Following the renaming, Simon renovated Sugarloaf Mills to reflect the new name, which included the rebranding of AMC Discover Mills 18 to AMC Sugarloaf Mills 18. In January 2013, most of the restaurants in the mall's food court had closed, including Johnny Rockets, Burger King, Chili's Too, Popeyes Louisiana Kitchen, and Great Steak & Potato, leaving only Subway and Great Wraps. In June 2013, it was announced that the Morristown, New Jersey-based Villa Enterprises Management would fill in the vacant food stalls with their own concepts: Villa Italian Kitchen, South Philly Steaks & Fries, Green Leaf's, Bananas, and Beyond Great Salads. Kay Jewelers would open in the former Johnny Rockets space.

In September 2015, Simon announced that rue21, Samsonite, and Crescent Jewelers would open at Sugarloaf Mills. The mall's Guess Factory Store was renovated. Zumiez also opened, alongside Fragrance Outlet, Justice, and Journeys. In June 2016, H&M announced that it would open in the spring of 2017. In December 2017, Worldwide Soccer, Xios, Unique Events Unlimited, Styletto Boutique, Sugarloaf Rugs, and ATL Linen Outlet were announced to open during the holiday season.

Simon Property Group struggled to refinance over $100 million in debt of Sugarloaf Mills in September 2018, leading to concerns regarding imminent default. CWCapital Asset Management took over a $105M and $18.4M loan held by Omega Advisors on September 13. Simon corrected the issue by reducing the principal balance by over 25% on the senior note from $135 million to about $100 million, preventing the risk of foreclosure.

=== 2020–present ===
The mall closed temporarily on March 18, 2020, due to the COVID-19 pandemic, alongside other Simon properties in the U.S., such as Mall of Georgia. Starbucks closed around 2021. On August 16, 2023, Simon Property Group filed a lawsuit against NeNe Leakes for $22,900 in unpaid rent; Leakes owned Swagg Boutique, which debuted at the mall in 2017 and shuttered in the summer of 2020, marked by "going out of business" liquidation signs.

In October 2025, Primark announced that it would open a 30,000-square-foot (2,800 m^{2}) store at Sugarloaf Mills; the opening date was announced to be in September 2026, replacing the former Neiman Marcus Last Call. Gift-wrapping stations were introduced to the mall in December 2025, alongside Go! Calenders, Swiss Leather, and Kitchen & Home. In January 2026, Saks Off 5th announced that they would close as part of a corporate restructuring by Saks Global, which made the decision to close 57 Saks Off 5th stores nationwide after they filed for Chapter 11 bankruptcy.

== Gallery ==
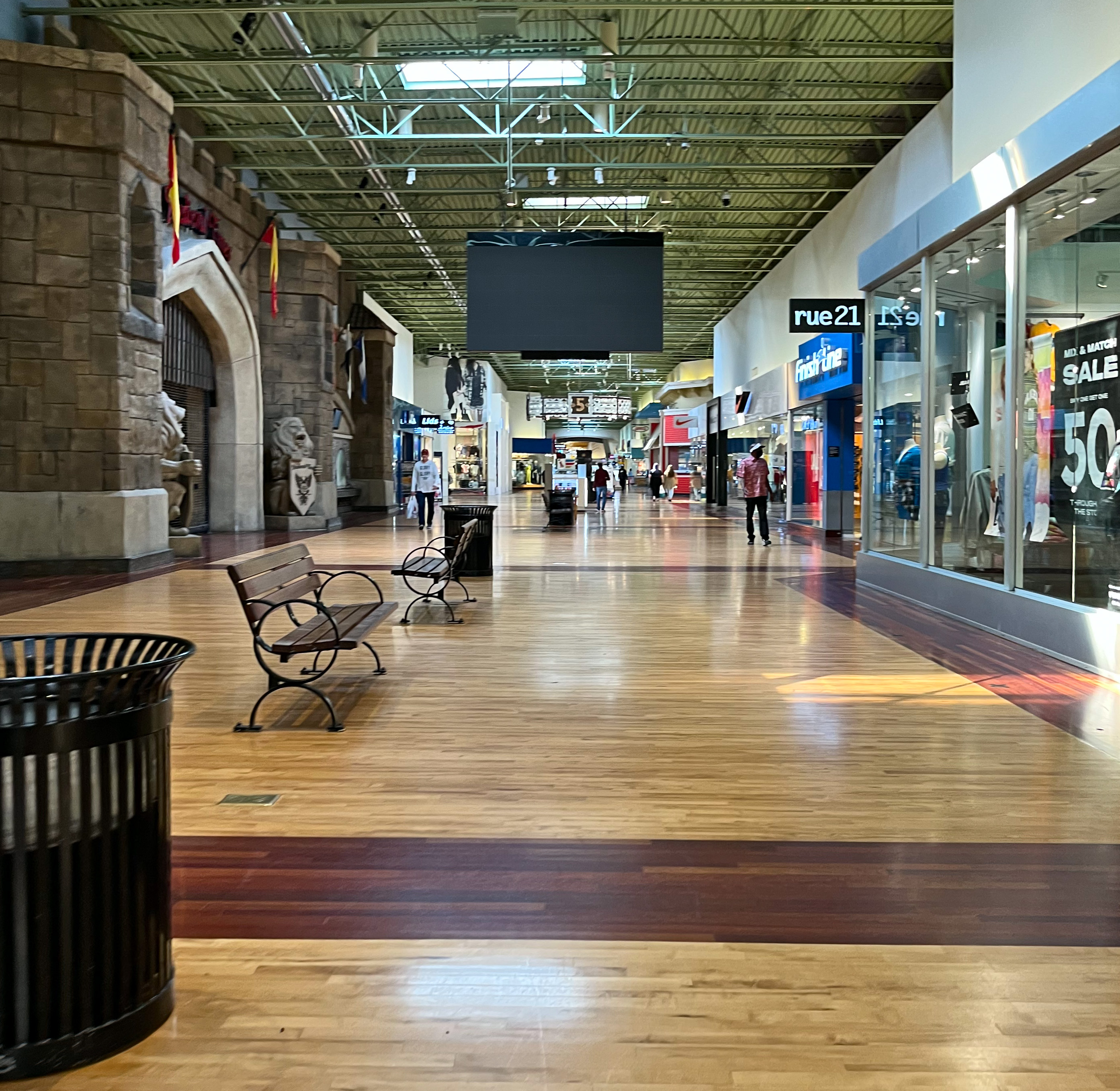
South corridor

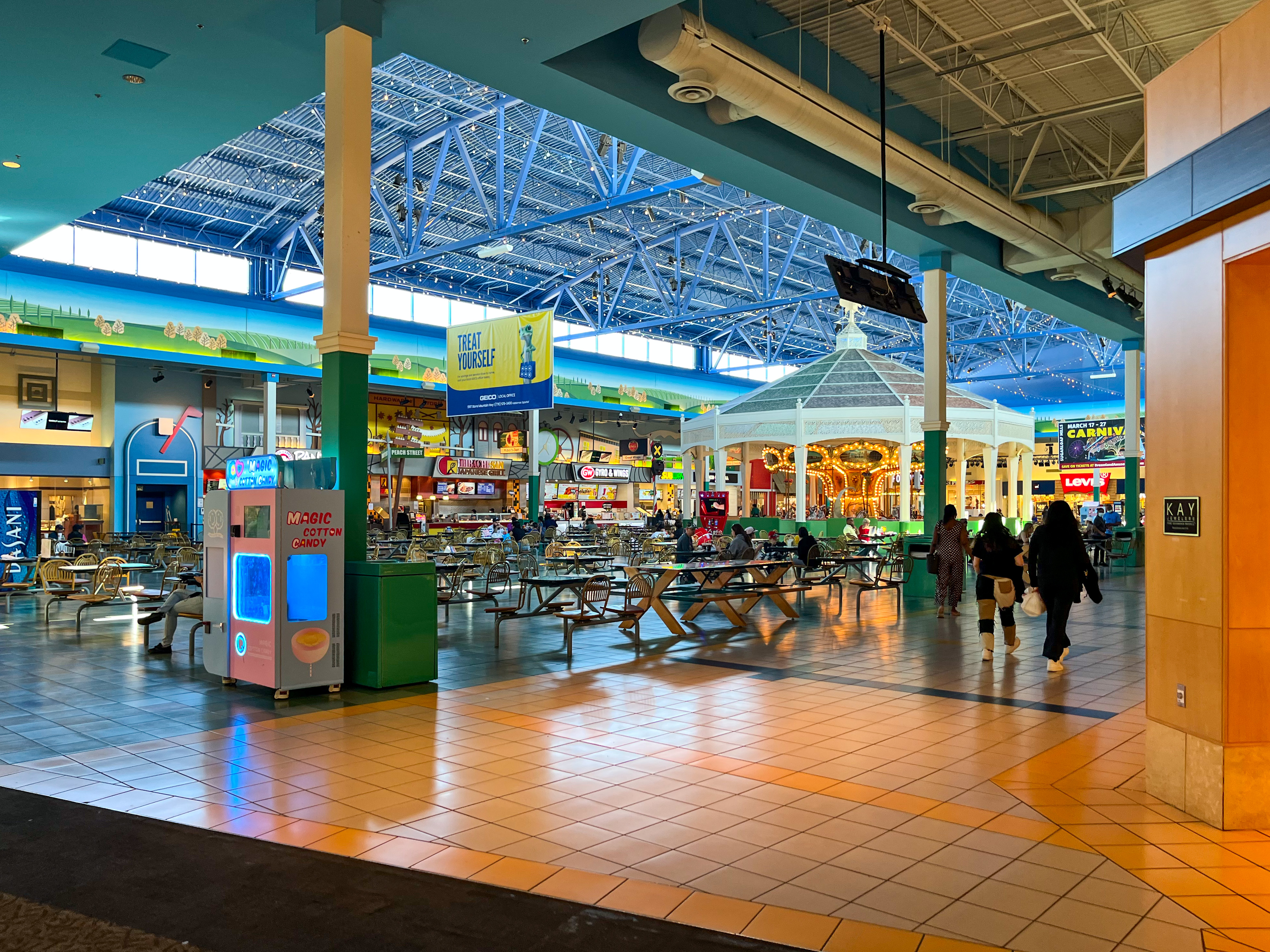
Food court

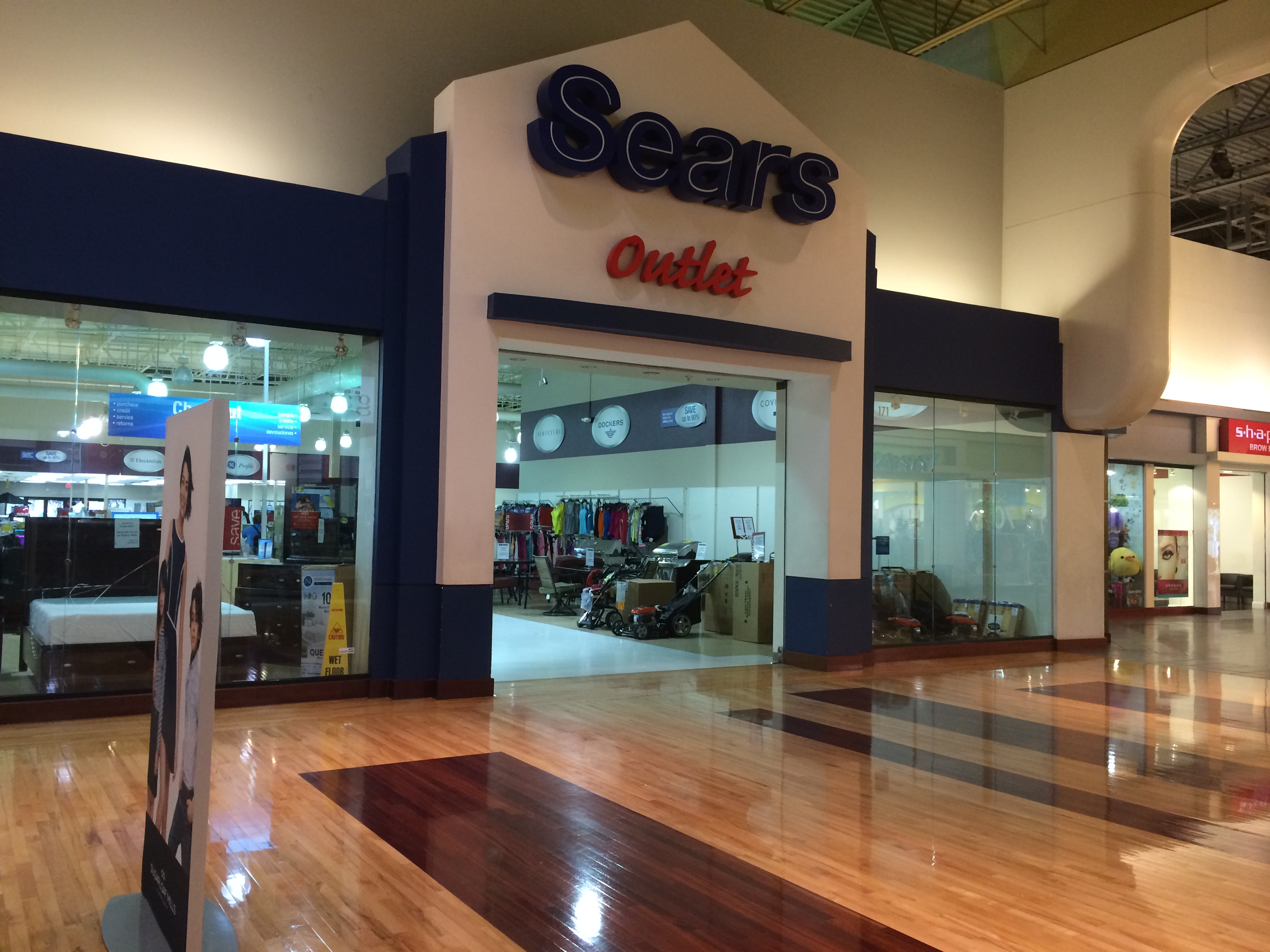
Sears Outlet storefront (April 2015)

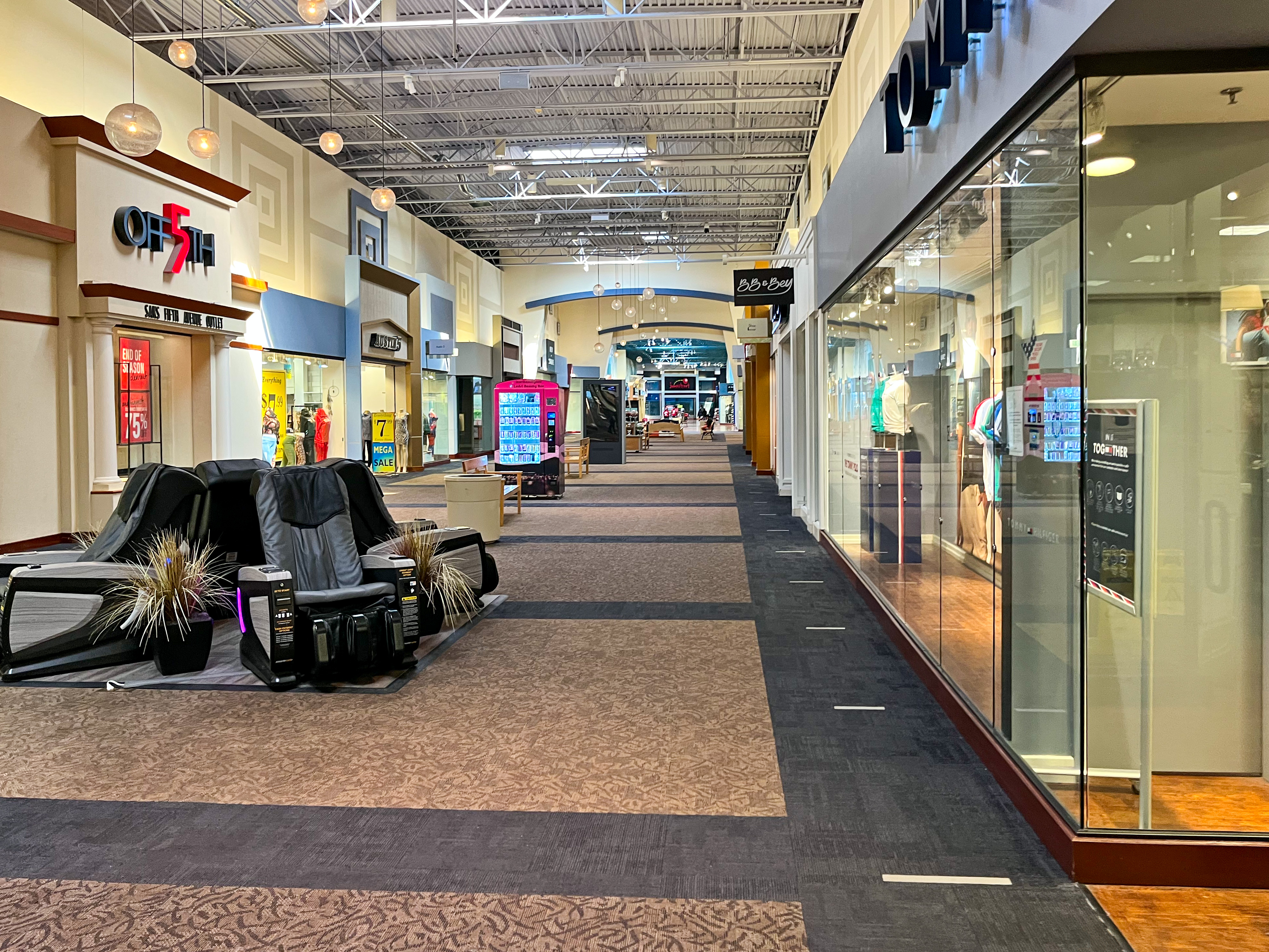
North corridor

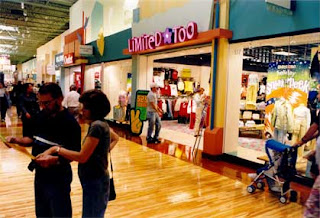
Limited Too (November 2001)

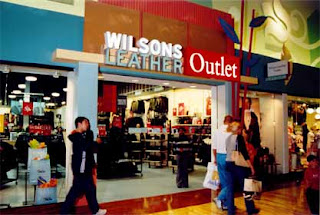
Wilson's Leather Outlet (November 2001)

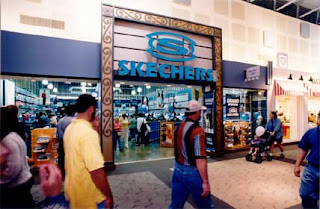
Skechers storefront (November 2001)

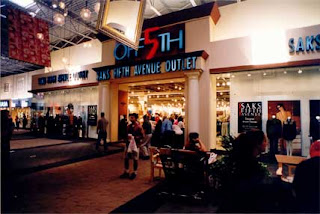
Saks Off 5th storefront (November 2001)

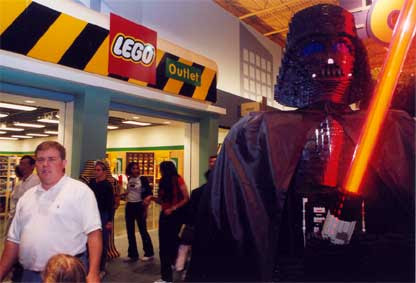
Lego Outlet (November 2001)

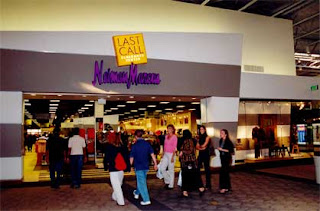
Neiman Marcus Last Call storefront (November 2001)

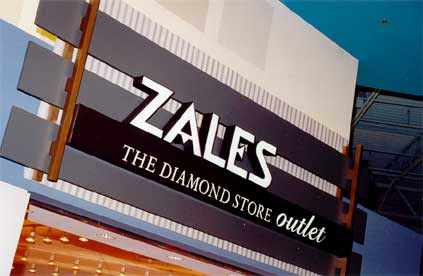
Zales Outlet signage (November 2001)

== See also ==
- Arundel Mills
- St. Louis Mills
- Pittsburgh Mills
