= Western Gwinnett Bikeway =

Multi-use trail in Georgia, United States

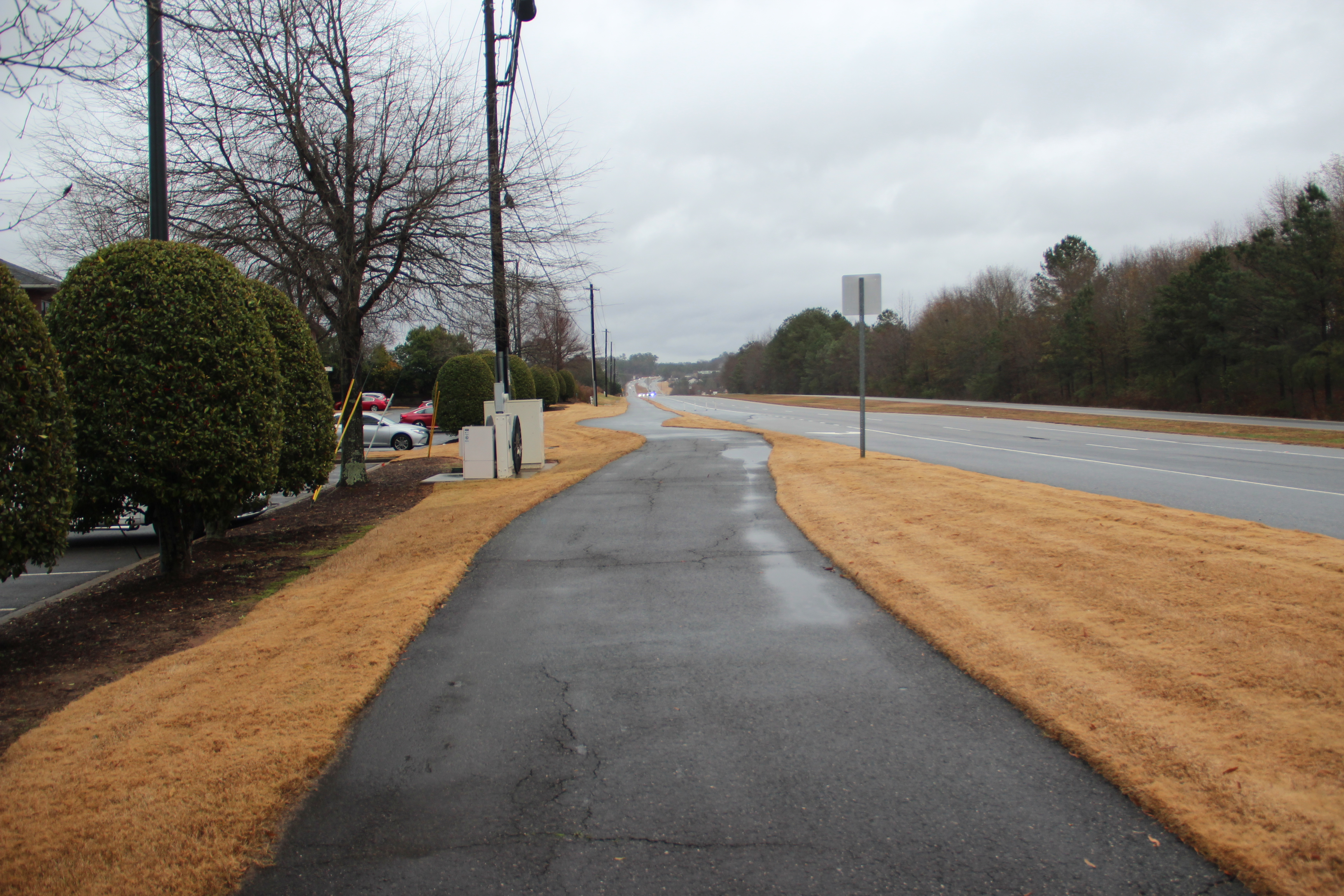
- The bikeway in 2018
- Length: 6.4 miles (10.3 km) (current total); 18.9 miles (30.4 km) (planned total)
- Location: Gwinnett County, Georgia, USA
- Established: 2011
- Trailheads: Duluth (north) to; Norcross (south)
- Use: Cycling and pedestrians
- Season: Year round
- Surface: Asphalt

The Western Gwinnett Bikeway (also West Gwinnett Bikeway) is a multi-use trail under construction along Peachtree Industrial Boulevard in Gwinnett County. The trail will be 10 feet (3.0 m) to 14 feet (4.3 m) wide and traverse the cities of Norcross, Peachtree Corners, Berkeley Lake, Duluth, Suwanee, Sugar Hill and Buford. It is intended to be the spine of West Gwinnett’s trails and greenways, connecting parks, trails, businesses, schools and neighborhoods to the urban core.

On February 27, 2018, the bikeway was designated as one of the signature trails of Gwinnett County.

== Current bikeway ==
As of May 2018, Phase I and II of the Western Gwinnett Bikeway have been completed. The trail currently runs from Peachtree Corners to Duluth.

== Future expansion ==
=== Western Gwinnett Bikeway Phase III ===
The upcoming project is the continuation of the Western Gwinnett Bikeway multi-use path. The phase III extension continues on Peachtree Industrial Boulevard from south of Rogers Bridge Road to the northern City limits eventually connecting to McGinnis Ferry Road in the City of Suwanee. The project is a collaborative effort between Duluth, Suwanee, and Gwinnett County. This will be a City/Gwinnett County 2014 SPLOST jointly funded project with Gwinnett County being responsible for design and construction. The City entered into an intergovernmental agreement with Gwinnett County in September 2014. The project is in the initial stages of preliminary design as of July 2017.

The south trail head of the Suwanee Creek Greenway currently is in Suwanee Creek Park. Once the extension is complete, the trail head will extend to the Western Gwinnett Bikeway.

=== Rogers Bridge ===
The city and county officials are currently in the design phase of the bike/pedestrian bridge. The bridge will serve as a connection to Johns Creek by reconstructing the bike/pedestrian bridge across the Chattahoochee River. The Rogers Bridge project will determine whether to replace or rehabilitate the existing Rogers Bridge over the Chattahoochee River, will take into account the environmental impacts of each option, and will restore the working bike/pedestrian connection between Duluth and Johns Creek. This will allow access to the planned 133 acre parkland under development in Johns Creek, and will allow Fulton County residents access to Rogers Bridge Park, the Chattapoochee Dog Park, and the future Phase III Western Gwinnett Bikeway currently under development by Gwinnett County.

=== The Loop Trail ===
As of January 2020, "a Loop Trail study is underway to provide an analysis of an approximate 14-mile segment of a 17-mile trail that will link to the Western Gwinnett Bikeway. The purpose of the study is to improve bike and pedestrian connectivity between existing parks and trails and to heavily traveled destinations and events, to reduce traffic congestion, and improve mobility and connectivity." This is in partnership with the Sugarloaf Community Improvement District and the Atlanta Regional Commission. This would provide better pedestrian and bicycle connectivity to the Gwinnett Place area. Currently, only a portion of trail is complete on North Berkeley Lake Road.

=== Sugar Hill Greenway ===
The Gwinnett County Board of Commissioners plan to connect the Sugar Hill Greenway to the bikeway. There are opportunities for trail spurs to connect Sugar Hill directly with the Suwanee Creek Greenway, Big Creek Greenway, Lake Lanier, the hiking trails of the Chattahoochee River National Recreation Area, Settles Bridge Park, Sims Lake Park, George Pierce Park, the Western Gwinnett Bikeway, and neighborhoods east of Peachtree Industrial Boulevard. Spurs will likely be a combination of on-road and off-road facilities.

== Funding ==
Funding has been provided at the city, county level and by the Atlanta Regional Commission. For the phase III funding, the agreements with Duluth and Suwanee cover jointly-funded projects that were part of the SPLOST voters approved last year. The extension will stretch roughly along Peachtree Industrial Boulevard, from west of Rogers Bridge Road to McGinnis Ferry Road. The bikeway currently runs from Norcross to Duluth. In Duluth, the county will contribute $375,000 and Duluth will reimburse the county for $87,963, which amounts to about 19 percent of the cost of the project, according to county documents. In Suwanee, the county will spend $250,000 on another leg of the extension while that city will reimburse the county for $58,642 of that cost.

== Concerns ==
Local residents have called for the addition of “Yield to Bikes and Pedestrians” signage and bright green pavement markings at locations where vehicles turn right across the elevated bikeway, particularly at T-shaped intersections with limited visibility. These enhancements are intended to improve driver awareness, reduce conflicts, and increase safety for cyclists and pedestrians. Supporters believe clearer markings will make the bikeway more predictable and encourage greater use.

== Events ==
A portion of the Suwanee Half Marathon course runs along the Suwanee extension of the bikeway. It is used for the annual event in February.

== Art ==
Currently, there is no street art, murals, outdoor gym equipment, sculptures or bicycle parking on the bikeway.

== See also ==
- Cycling infrastructure
- 10-Minute Walk
- Smart growth
- Walkability
