= Gwinnett Environmental & Heritage Center =

Community center and museum in Buford, Georgia

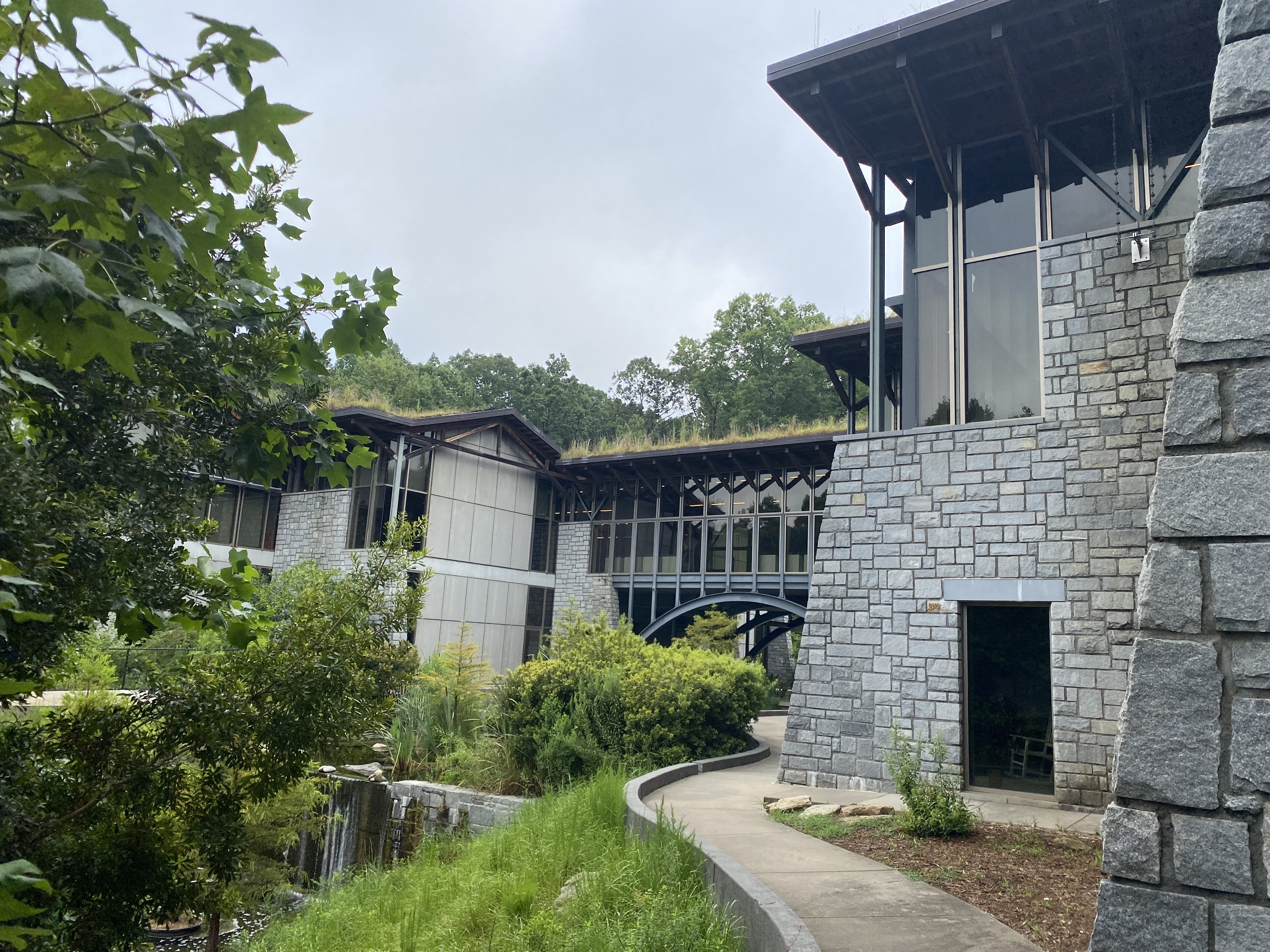
- Alternative names: Gwinnett EHC

General information
- Location: Buford, Georgia, 2020 Clean Water Drive, United States
- Coordinates: 34°03′51″N 84°00′18″W
- Completed: August 2006
- Opened: October 6, 2006
- Cost: $16.6 million
- Owner: Gwinnett County

Technical details
- Floor area: 65,000 sq ft (6,000 m^{2}) or 59,000 sq ft (5,500 m^{2})
- Grounds: 233 acres (94 ha; 0.364 sq mi)

Design and construction
- Architect: Meg Needle
- Architecture firm: Lord Aeck Sargent

Website
- Gwinnett Environmental & Heritage Center Website

The Gwinnett Environmental & Heritage Center is an environmental and cultural community center and museum in Buford, Georgia, United States. The center opened in 2006 and is designed to be an educational facility with a focus on environmentalism. The building itself follows the center's environmental theme and is a green building that utilizes less water and energy than other buildings of its size. It hosts exhibits and summer programs, many of which are focused on environmental topics, including water science and preservation primarily geared towards children. Located at the center are an historic home and barn from the 1800s that were each moved to sit adjacent to the facility in 2012 from elsewhere in Gwinnett County. It also has a ropes course that opened in 2011 and is connected to a series of several miles of walking trails that lead to other nearby destinations.

== History ==
The center was the result of a collaboration between the Gwinnett County Board of Commissioners, Gwinnett County Public Schools, the University of Georgia, and the Gwinnett Environmental & Heritage Center Foundation. It was created as an educational facility for Gwinnett County with a focus on environmental issues. Funding for the $16.6 million project was provided through a special purpose local option sales tax that Gwinnett County implemented in 2001 and 2005.

The building was designed by architect Meg Needle of the Atlanta-based architecture firm Lord Aeck Sargent. Construction of the center began in spring of 2005, and construction was completed in August 2006. The center hosted an open house on September 30, 2006 and officially opened on October 6, 2006. New facilities were added in 2012 via a $2.2 million contract which included a festival field for outdoor events as well as a 2,400 sq ft (220 m^{2}) storage building that were intended to highlight sustainable construction and environmental technologies.

== Facility ==
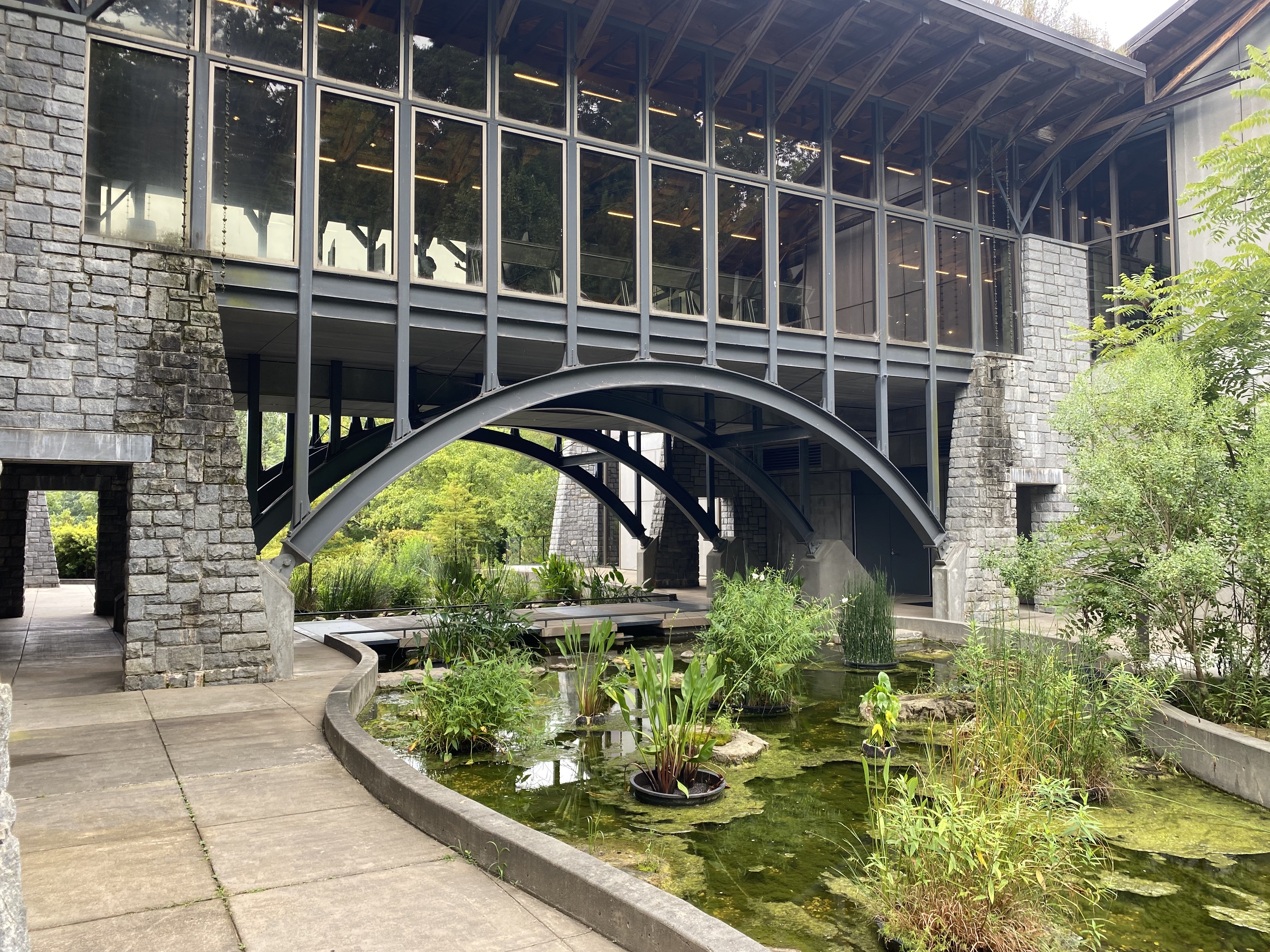
The two wings are connected by a bridge that goes over the man-made stream

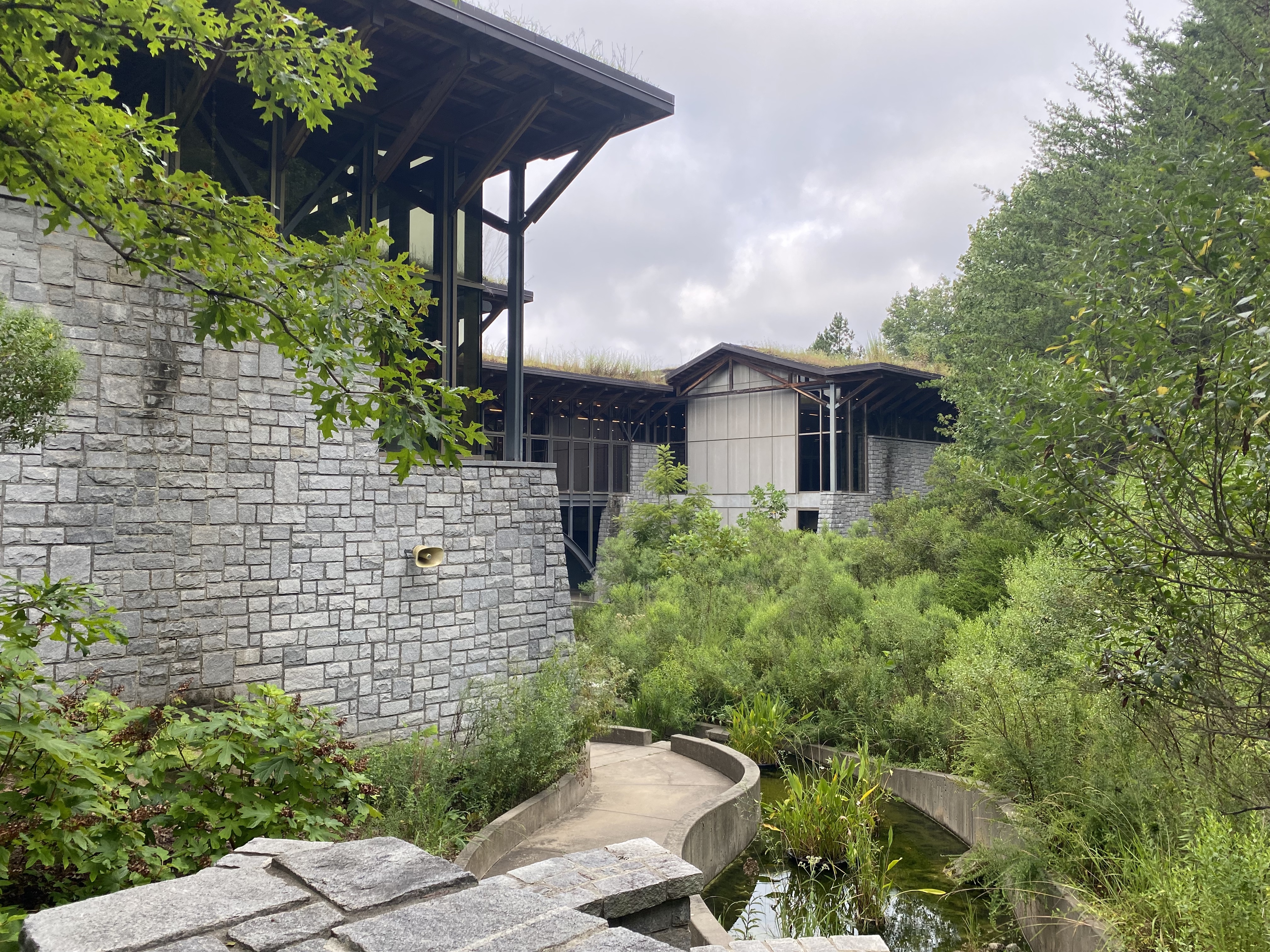
Sedum grows on the roof of the building to help with runoff

The building is Gwinnett County's first LEED Gold certified building. The facility is made of stone and natural pine. It is designed to use 75 percent less potable water and 35 percent less energy than a typical building of the same size. The center is adjacent to the F. Wayne Hill Water Resources Center, one of the three most effective water reclamation facilities in the United States.

The center has a focus on water-saving and energy-saving strategies, such as using non-potable water from the nearby water reclamation facility for toilets, irrigation, and as part of the building's cooling system. The paved areas include porous paving and bioswales to help channel groundwater and runoff.

The roof is a 40,000 sq ft (3,700 m^{2}) vegetated sloped roof, which was the largest sloped green roof in the United States at the time of its construction. The roof is planted with six different species of sedum to reduce surface runoff and to improve the quality of the runoff. The resulting grass on the roof grown from the sedum also reduces the heat absorbed by the building, keeping the building cool. The interior of the center is variously described as being 65,000 sq ft (6,000 m^{2}) or 59,000 sq ft (5,500 m^{2}),

The building's location was chosen to minimize the need for grading, and because the chosen location had a dry ravine that was built over, with one wing on each side of the ravine with a bridge over the ravine connecting the two wings. The ravine was turned into a man-made stream made of reinforced concrete that flows between the two wings of the center and acts as a horizontal cooling tower.

The center is located on 233 acres (94 ha; 0.364 sq mi) of land and is connected to several miles of walking trails with a council ring and covered pavilion, and which connect to the Ivy Creek Greenway, the Mall of Georgia, and George Pierce Park. The center serves as a venue for events and weddings and allows for the rental of conference rooms, pavilions, a catering kitchen, and a theatre presentation center.

== Exhibits ==
The center provides scientific, environmental, and cultural exhibits. Many of the exhibits are focused on the topics of water and water conservation, with many of the exhibitions geared towards school-age children. The center has hosted exhibits on the area's original Creek and Cherokee inhabitants, folk art exhibitions, and workshops that encourage environmentally friendly ways of living. In 2021 the Gwinnett County commissioners approved a $1.97 million exhibit called "Pathways Through the Piedmont" to showcase the ecosystem in the Piedmont region of the United States, including its waterways, geological formations, flora, and fauna. The center also hosts seasonal activities such as summer camp programs and acts as a location for environmentally-friendly Christmas tree removal after the end of the holiday season.

== Chesser-Williams House ==
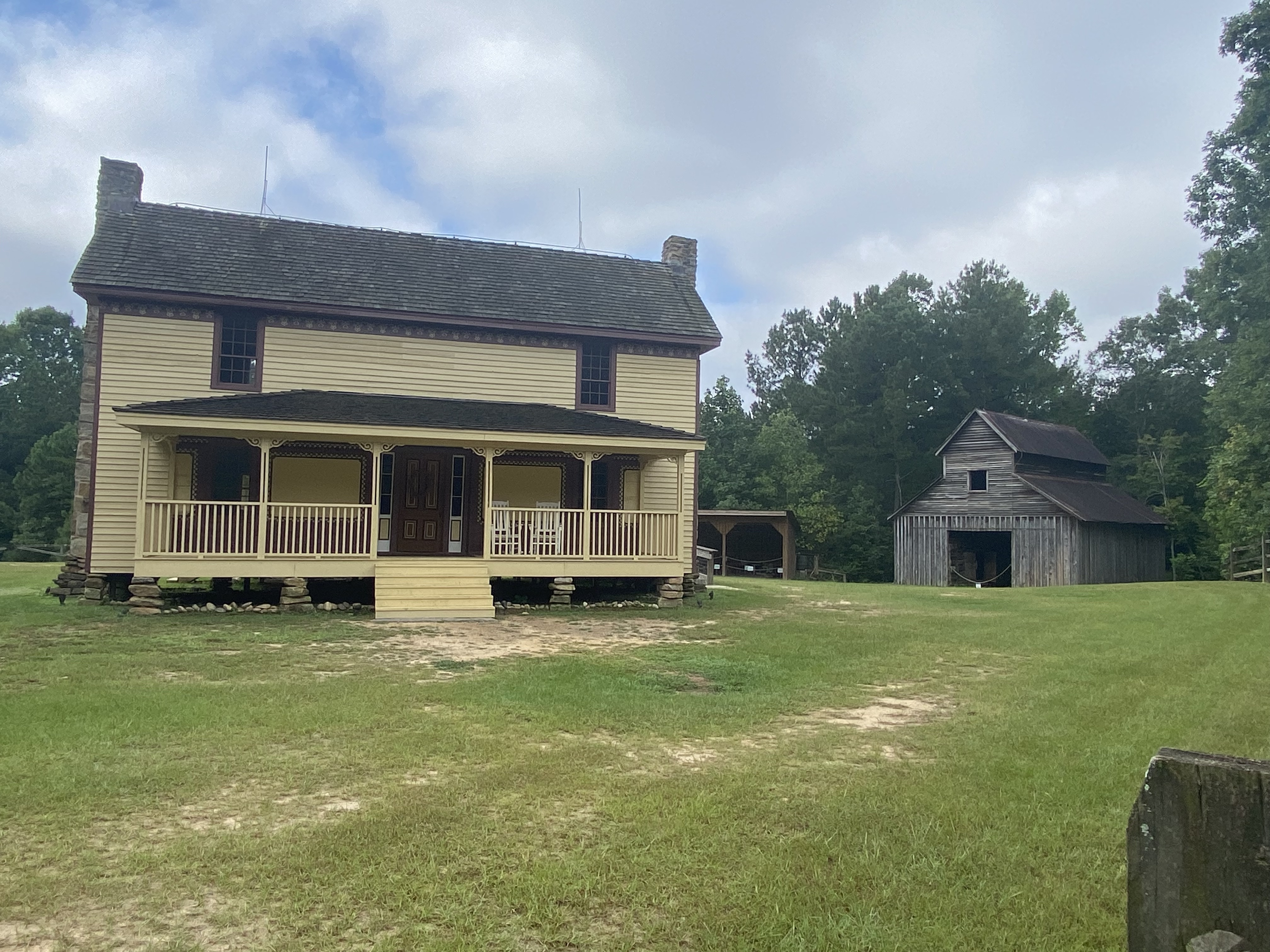
Chesser-Williams House, with the Lee Farm Barn seen in the background

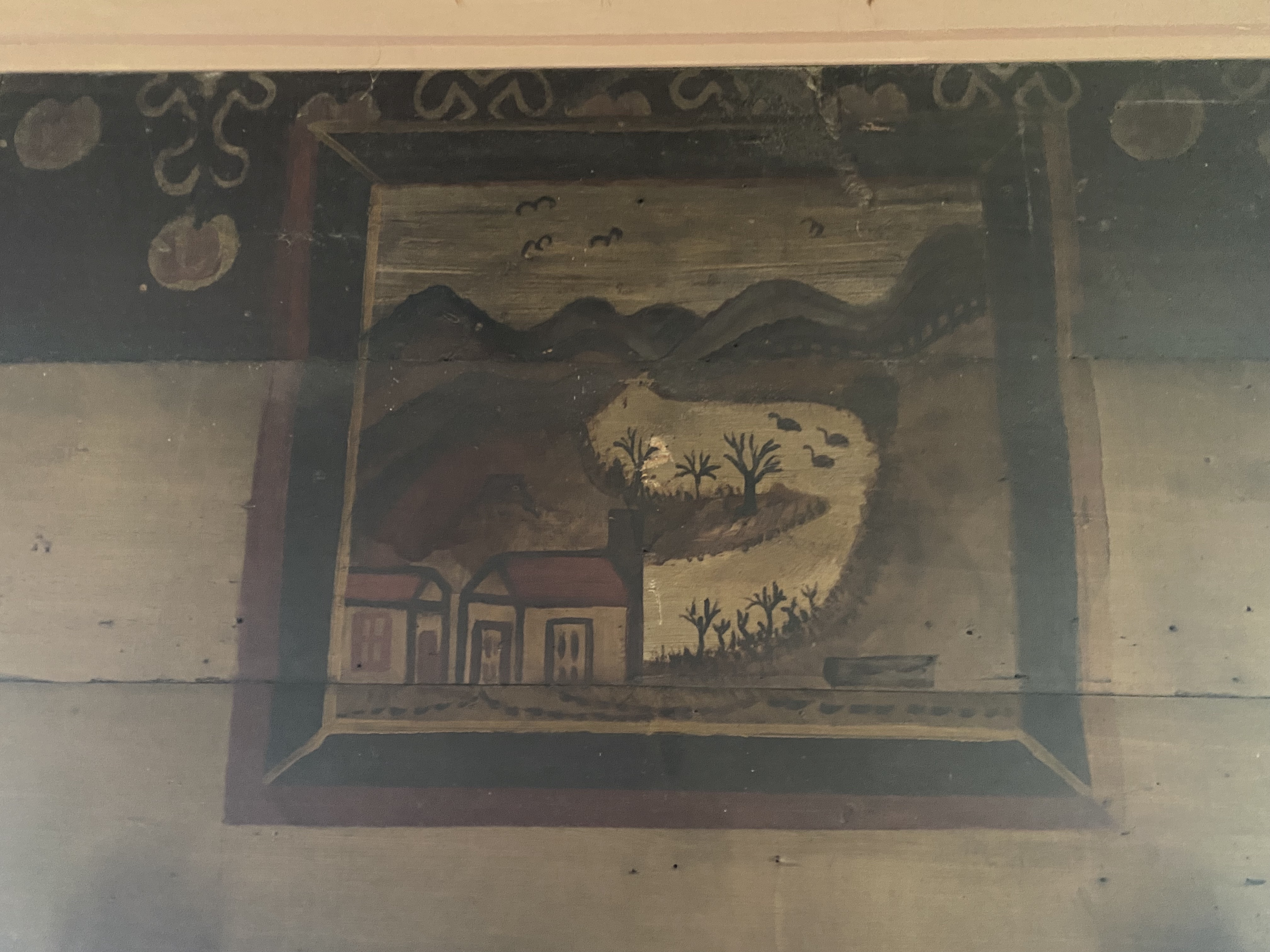
Close-up of art inside the Chesser-Williams House on the overmantle

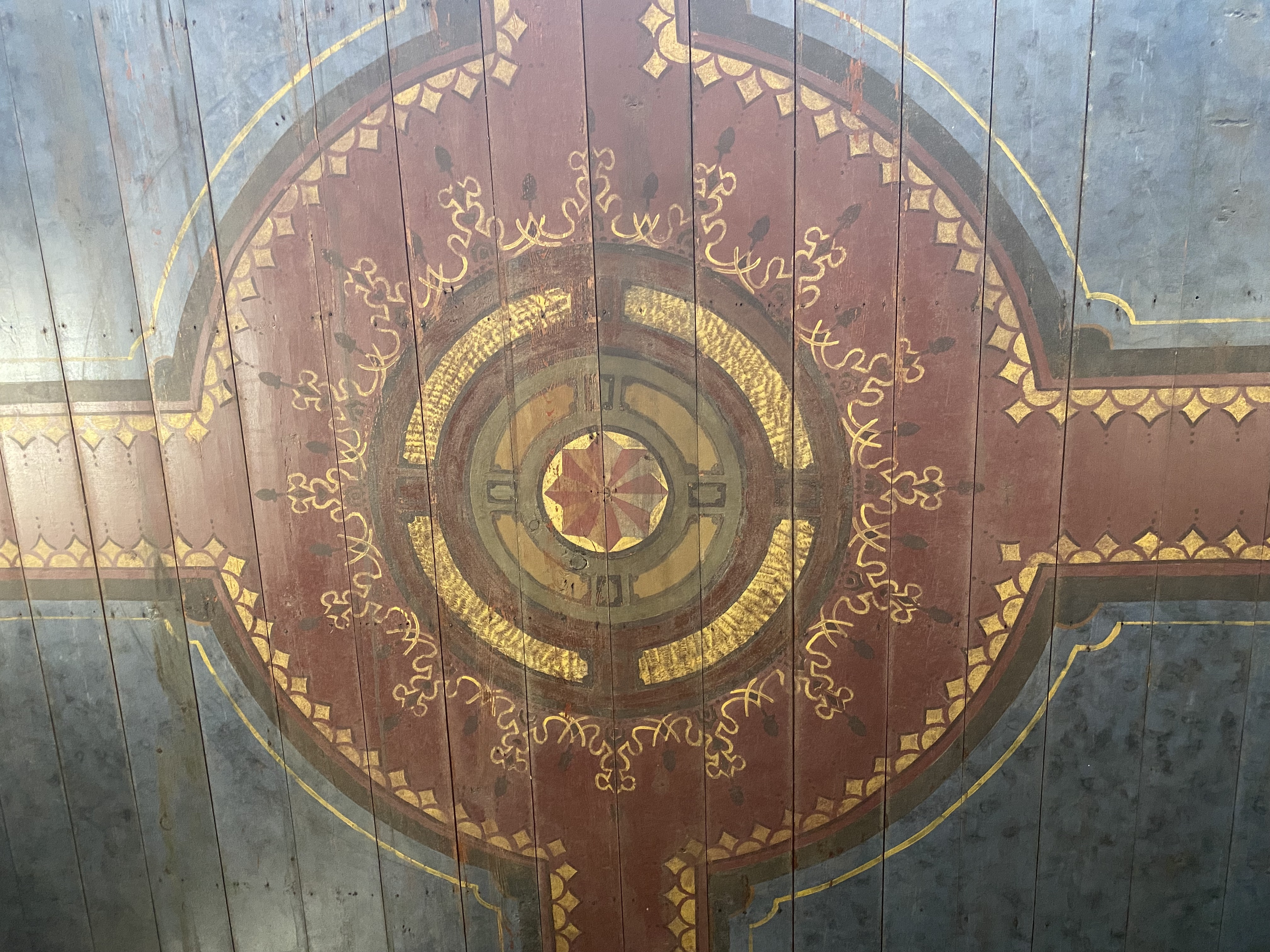
Painted ceiling of the Chesser-Williams House

The Chesser-Williams House is a preserved home from the 1850s that was moved from its original location to sit adjacent to the museum. The house is an antebellum house made of heart pine in an I-house style. It is unknown who built the house, but it was owned and lived in by American Civil War veteran Benjamin Chesser in the 1870s, who had served Georgia in the American Civil War as part of Company D of Georgia's 9th Artillery Battalion, known as the "Gwinnett Artillery". Chesser was living in the house when an unknown itinerant German painter traveling from Texas to North Carolina painted scenic folk art on the interior and exterior of the home in exchange for room and board. The scenic painting-style folk art can be found inside the home in places such as the overmantel.

Donated by Jerald Williams, ownership of the Chesser-Williams house was given over to Gwinnett County in May 2012. In September 2012 the kitchen of the home was moved six miles from Braselton Highway to the museum, and in November 2012 the remainder of the house was moved. In 2015 the Gwinnett Environmental & Heritage Center received an "Excellence in Preservation Award" from the Georgia Trust for Historic Preservation for their efforts in preserving the Chesser-Williams House.

Adjacent to the Chesser-Williams House is the Lee Farm Barn, an historic crib barn from the 1800s. The barn was moved in 2012 from its original location in Lilburn, Georgia by dismantling it and reconstructing it in its new location. Separate from the center itself, the Chesser-Williams House and Lee Farm Barn are also used as a venue for events and weddings.

== Treetop Quest ==
The center is the Gwinnett location of Treetop Quest, an outdoor ropes course that opened at the center in September 2011. Amongst the trees there are more than 120 courses for participants of differing ages, including zip-lining courses, rope ladders, monkey bridges, and rope swings. All of the courses have a belay system.
