= Old Seminary Building =

- U.S. National Register of Historic Places
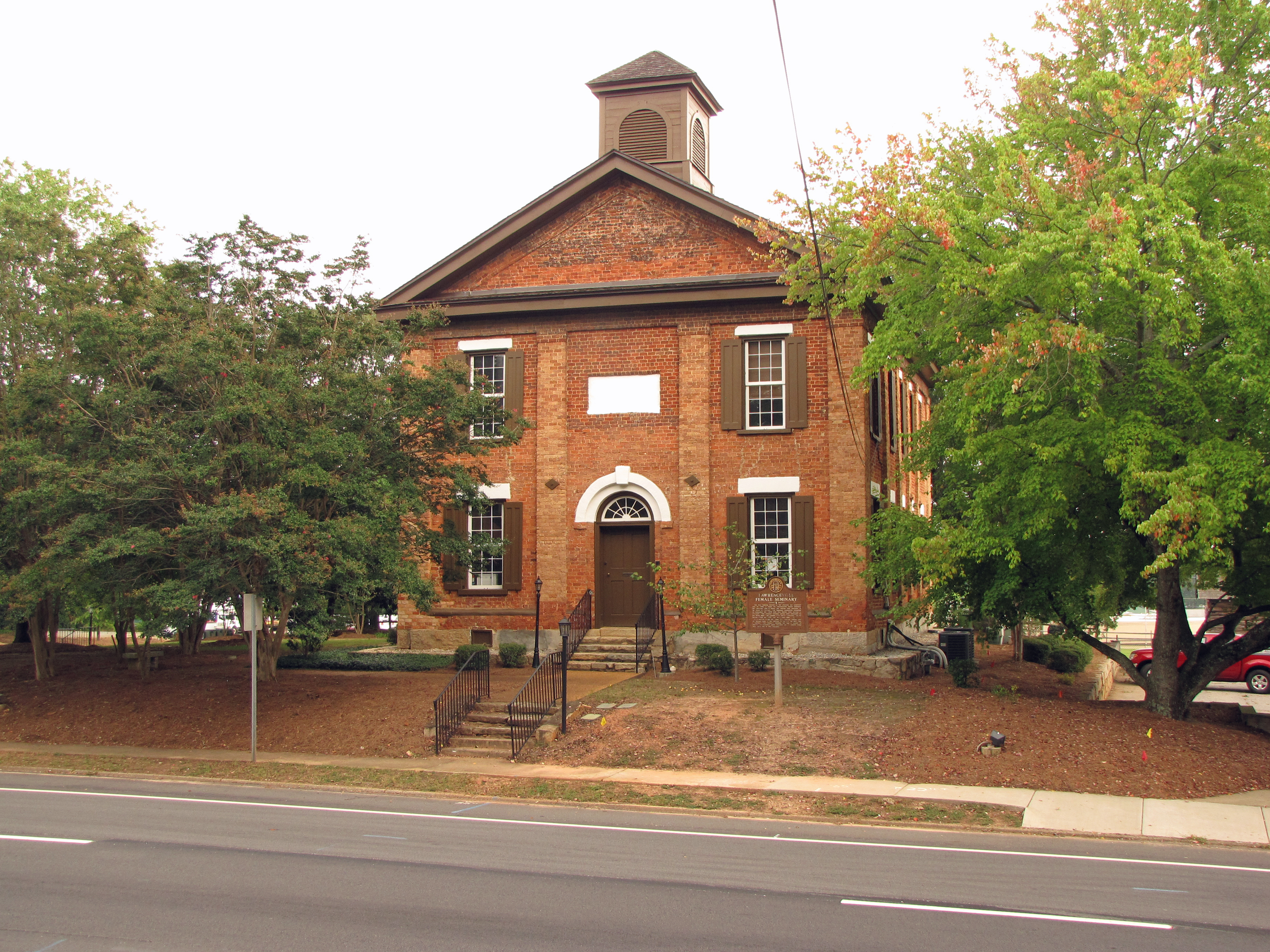

- Location within Metro Atlanta Location within Georgia Location within the United States
- Location: 455 Perry St., Lawrenceville, Georgia
- Coordinates: 33.9525°N 83.9890°W
- Area: 9.9 acres (4.0 ha)
- Built: 1855
- Architectural style: Greek Revival, Federal
- NRHP reference No.: 70000206
- Added to NRHP: December 29, 1970

The Old Seminary Building, also known as the Old Masonic Lodge or Lawrenceville Female Seminary Building, is a building in Lawrenceville, Georgia, USA, that was built in 1855 in Greek Revival and Federal style. It was originally constructed as a school but has had various tenants through the years, most notably Lawrenceville Lodge No. 131 Free and Accepted Masons, who used the second story of the building for meetings for more than a century.

It is 36 by 51 feet (11 m × 16 m) in plan; its two floors have 12 feet (3.7 m) ceilings.

Later, it housed the Gwinnett History Museum and was open by appointment with the Gwinnett Environmental & Heritage Center.

It was listed on the National Register of Historic Places in 1970.
