= Ivy Creek Greenway =

Multi-use trail in Georgia, United States

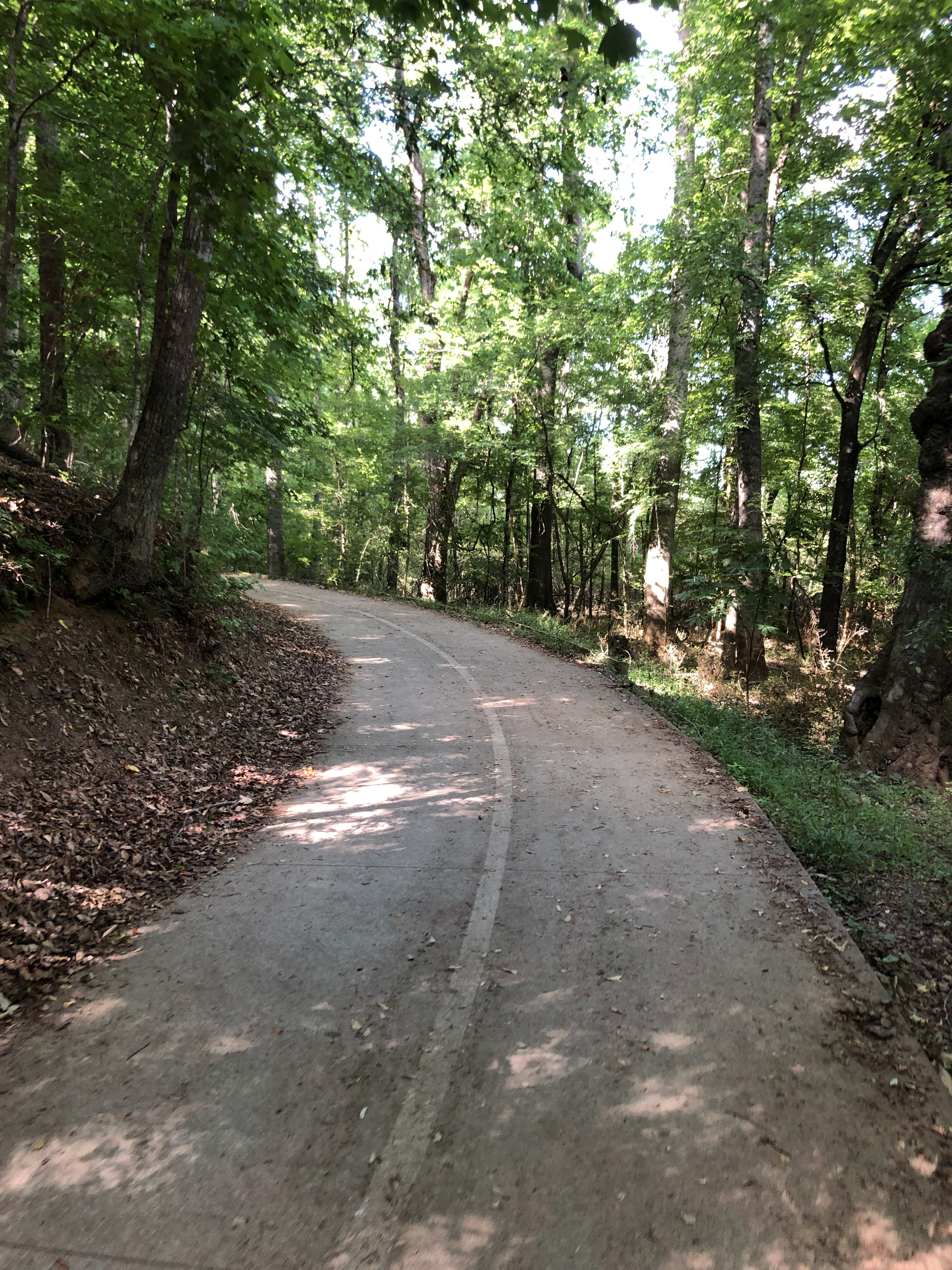
- Ivy Creek Greenway near George Pierce Park
- Length: 3.4 miles (5.5 km)
- Location: Buford, Georgia, USA; Suwanee, Georgia, USA
- Trailheads: Mall of Georgia (north) to; George Pierce Park (south)
- Use: Cycling and pedestrians
- Season: Year round
- Surface: Concrete
- Website: Ivy Creek Greenway

The Ivy Creek Greenway is a 3.4-mile (5.5 km) multi-use trail under construction in the cities of Buford, Georgia and Suwanee, Georgia, in the United States.

In 2014, a 1.5-mile section of the trail was added and includes two boardwalks, an overlook and a 270-foot cable bridge spanning Ivy Creek.

On February 27, 2018, the greenway was designated as one of the signature trails of Gwinnett County.

== See also ==
- Cycling infrastructure
- 10-Minute Walk
- Smart growth
- Walkability
