= Suwanee Half Marathon =

Marathon in the United States

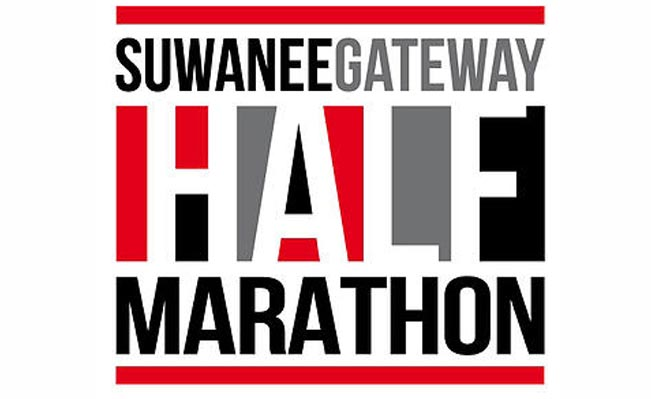
- Date: February
- Location: Suwanee, Georgia
- Event type: Road
- Distance: Half marathon
- Established: 2015; 11 years ago
- Course records: (men) 1:15:59.4 (women) 1:20:15.5
- Website: Suwanee Half Marathon

The Suwanee Half Marathon (formerly branded as the Suwanee Gateway Half Marathon) is an annual USATF certified half marathon road running race. It was established in 2015 and has been run every year since. It passes through landmarks such as Suwanee Town Center, Suwanee Creek Greenway and George Pierce Park. The course USATF certification is GA14090WC and is a qualifier for the Peachtree Road Race, the world’s largest 10 km race. Performance Race Services administers the half marathon and the 5K that shortly follows it known as the Old Town 5K.

== Course description ==
The race route begins at the Suwanee City Hall. It covers a mixture of hilly and flat terrain as runners travel throughout Suwanee and end at the Suwanee Town Center Park. The distance is a 13.1 mile trek. All runners receive a finisher’s medal and a long-sleeved shirt, and custom fleece blanket (new design each year).

== Past winners ==
Key: Course record

Edition	Year	Date	Men's winner	Time (h:m:s)	Women's winner	Time (h:m:s)	Sources
1st	2015	January 31	Christopher Warren (USA)	1:26:30.1	Savannah Carnahan (USA)	1:34:35.9	
2nd	2016	January 30	Chris Arserault (USA)	1:24:01.1	Kelly Meyer (USA)	1:20:15.5	
3rd	2017	February 26	Kenyrik Alexis (USA)	1:24:32.2	Ginger Howell (USA)	1:32:56.1	
4th	2018	February 11	Patrick Ollinger (USA)	1:20:30.5	Elizabeth "Betsy" Magato (USA)	1:36:34.6	
5th	2019	February 10	Jason Holder (USA)	1:24:44.6	Yayoi Holmes (JPN)	1:34:41.7	
6th	2020	February 9	Zack Sims (USA)	1:15:59.4	Yayoi Holmes (JPN)	1:34:05.9	
7th	2021	February 21	Xavier Partier (FRA)	1:23:40:29	Alexis Wilmot (USA)	1:31:07.09	
8th	2022	February 20	Victor Ho (USA)	1:22:41:31	Alissa Palladino (USA)	1:39:10:42	
9th	2023	February 19	Johnatan Corso (USA)	1:25:13.93	Kelly O'Saben (USA)	1:30:08.08	
10th	2024	February 18					
