= Suwanee Creek Greenway =

Multi-use trail in Georgia, United States

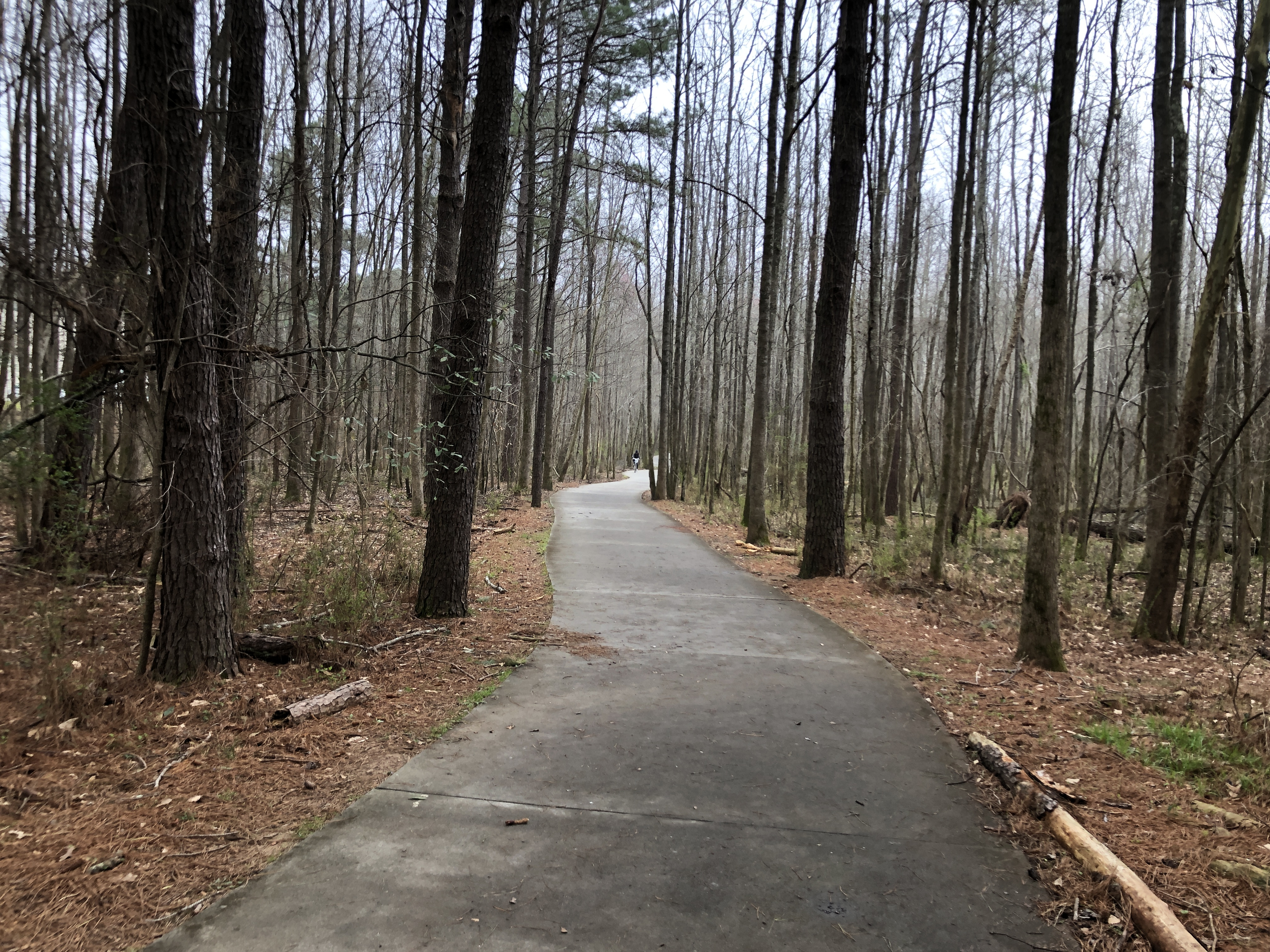
- The greenway in 2019
- Length: 4.0 miles (6.4 km)
- Location: Suwanee, Georgia, USA
- Trailheads: George Pierce Park (north) to; Western Gwinnett Bikeway (south)
- Use: Cycling and pedestrians
- Season: Year round
- Surface: Concrete
- Website: Suwanee Creek Greenway

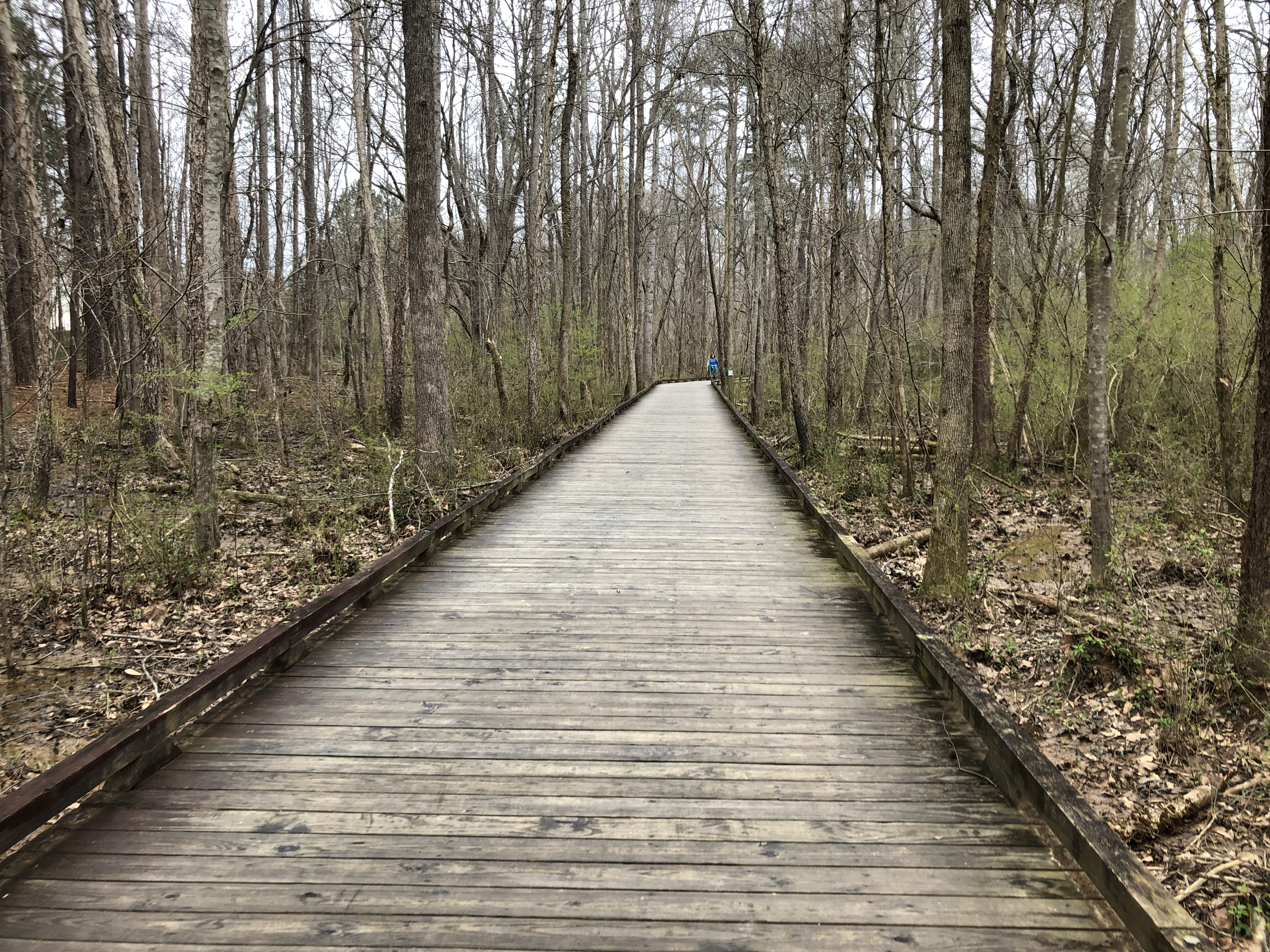
A boardwalk section of the greenway

The Suwanee Creek Greenway is a 4.0-mile (6.4 km) multi-use trail under construction in the city of Suwanee, Georgia, in the United States. The trail is a hard-surface and meanders through four miles of wooded areas, wetlands, and wildlife habitat. The greenway connects nearly 400 acres of parkland as well as residential and commercial areas.

On February 27, 2018, the greenway was designated as one of the signature trails of Gwinnett County.

== Access points ==
Bike share station =

- George Pierce Park, near the soccer and back softball fields.
- Suwanee Elementary School, on weekends and after 4 pm only during the week.
- Town Center area, via Portland Drive and the wooden boardwalk/bridge that runs parallel to Lawrenceville-Suwanee Road.
- Martin Farm Park, about a half-mile west of Satellite Boulevard.
- Near the Suwanee Sports Academy at 3640 Burnette Road.
- Suwanee Creek Park

== Future extension ==
Currently, the south trail head is in Suwanee Creek Park. Once the extension is complete, the trail head will extend to the Western Gwinnett Bikeway.

== Events ==
A portion of the Suwanee Half Marathon course runs along the Suwanee extension of the bikeway. It is used for the annual event in February.

== Art ==
Currently, there is no street art, murals, outdoor gym equipment, sculptures or bicycle parking on the greenway.

== See also ==
- Cycling infrastructure
- 10-Minute Walk
- Smart growth
- Walkability
