= Mall of Georgia =

Shopping mall in Buford, Georgia

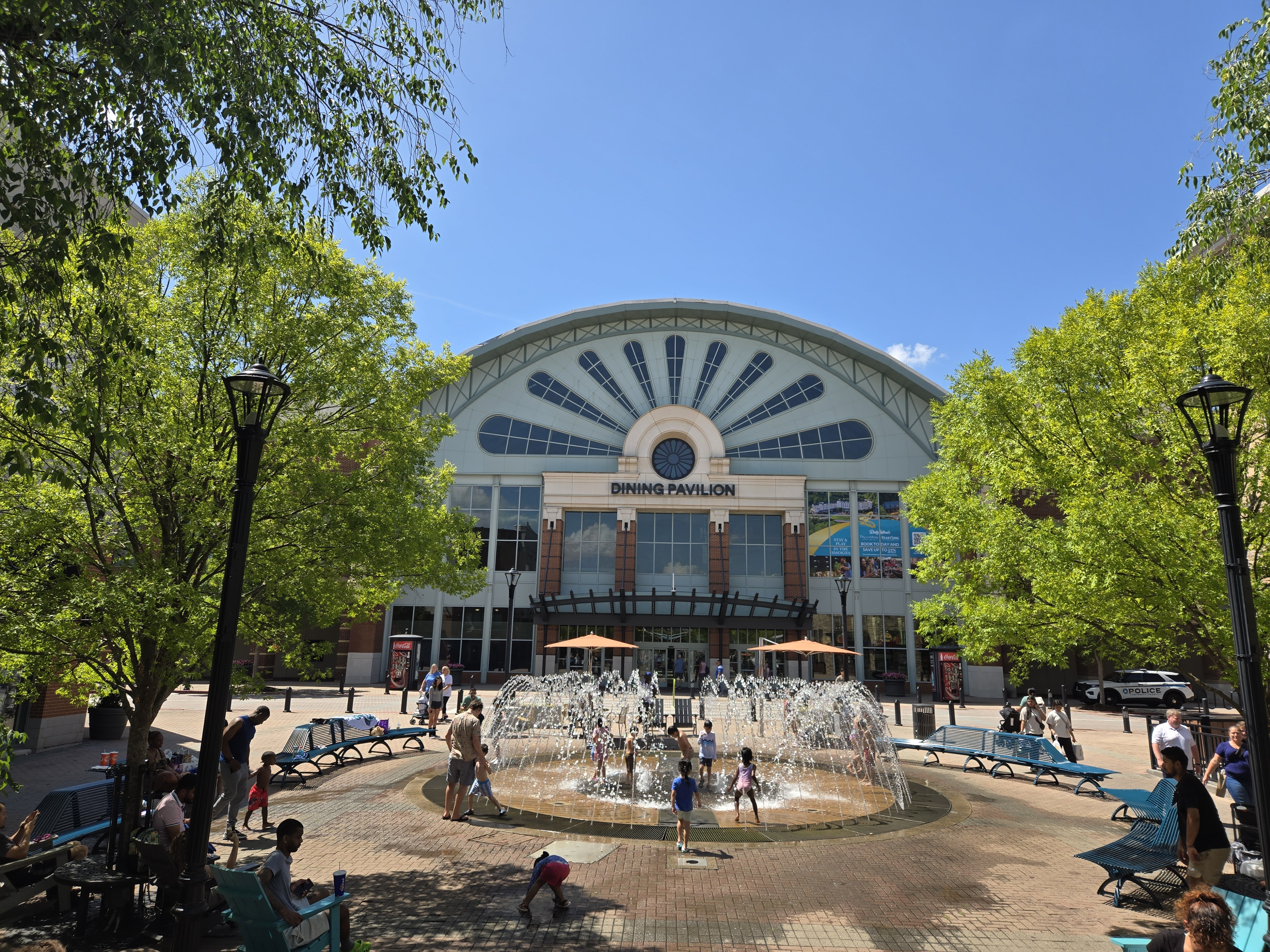
- Main entrance plaza of the Mall of Georgia
- Location: Gwinnett County, Georgia, U.S.
- Coordinates: 34.065411°N 83.984702°W
- Opened: August 13, 1999; 27 years ago
- Developer: Simon Property Group
- Manager: Simon Property Group
- Owner: Simon Property Group
- Num. of stores: 225
- Num. of anchor tenants: 9
- Floor area: 1,845,186 sq ft (171,423 m^{2})
- Floors: 2 with partial third floor (3 in Macy's and Dillard's, third floor mezzanine in Dick's Sporting Goods)
- Website: www.simon.com/mall/mall-of-georgia

Mall of Georgia is an enclosed super-regional shopping mall located in unincorporated Gwinnett County, Georgia, near the city of Buford, 35 miles (56 km) northeast of Atlanta. Opened in August 1999, it is currently the largest shopping mall in the state of Georgia, consisting of 195 stores on three levels. The mall features a large village section, comprising lifestyle tenants and restaurants in an outdoor setting, as well as a 500-seat amphitheater. In 2018, the Mall of Georgia renovated the indoor food court area by updating the seating arrangements, furniture styles, and color schemes. The Mall of Georgia was built by and is still owned by Simon Property Group. A portion of the Ivy Creek Greenway runs along the shopping mall area. The mall’s anchor stores are Von Maur, Macy's, Dillard's, Belk, JCPenney, Havertys Furniture, Barnes & Noble, Dick's Sporting Goods, and a 20-screen Regal Cinemas.

The adjacent Mall of Georgia Crossing is anchored by Best Buy, TJ Maxx, Target, Hobby Lobby, Nordstrom Rack, HomeGoods, Ulta Beauty, and Staples.

== History ==
The Mall of Georgia officially opened August 13, 1999, drawing shoppers away from Gwinnett Place Mall, and featured Dillard's, JCPenney, Lord & Taylor, and Nordstrom as its anchor stores, with Bed Bath & Beyond, Haverty's, and Galyan's (now Dick's Sporting Goods) as additional junior anchors. Lord & Taylor, Dillard's, and JCPenney opened on August 11, 1999, two days before the official opening of the mall. The Mall of Georgia also has a 20-screen Regal Cinemas and an IMAX Theater. As of July 2026, the mall's IMAX Theatre is one of the 25 theaters in the United States, and the only theater in Georgia, to showcase films in IMAX 70mm. In 2000, Atlanta-based Rich's was added on, and many more mall stores were added, bringing the total number of stores in the mall to more than 200. Lord & Taylor was repositioned and shuttered entirely; it was replaced with Belk in 2005. Following Federated Department Stores' (now Macy's, Inc.) decision to consolidate nameplates in 2003, the Rich's store at Mall of Georgia was dual-branded as Rich's-Macy's, and the Rich's name was dropped entirely in 2005. In 2015, it was announced Von Maur would be joining the center, replacing Nordstrom. In late 2024, the mall began the process of de-theming the mall, removing the geographic section names, murals from each region, unique lighting fixtures for each section, and the town and city names which were above the stores on the second floor.

== Statue ==
The statue atop the mall is of Button Gwinnett, one of the first men to sign the United States Declaration of Independence, and for whom its location of Gwinnett County is named.

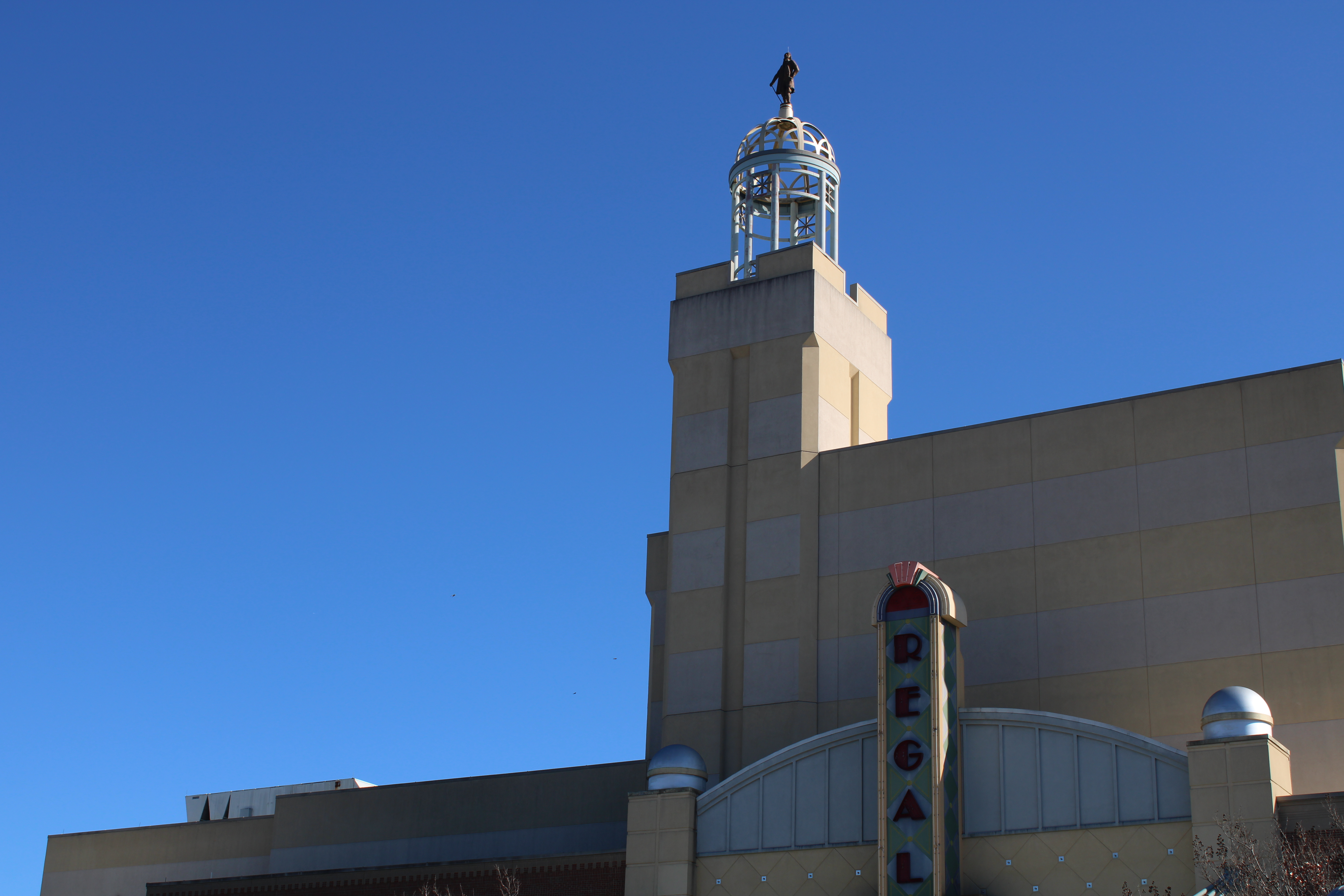
The Statue
