= Buford, Georgia =

- City
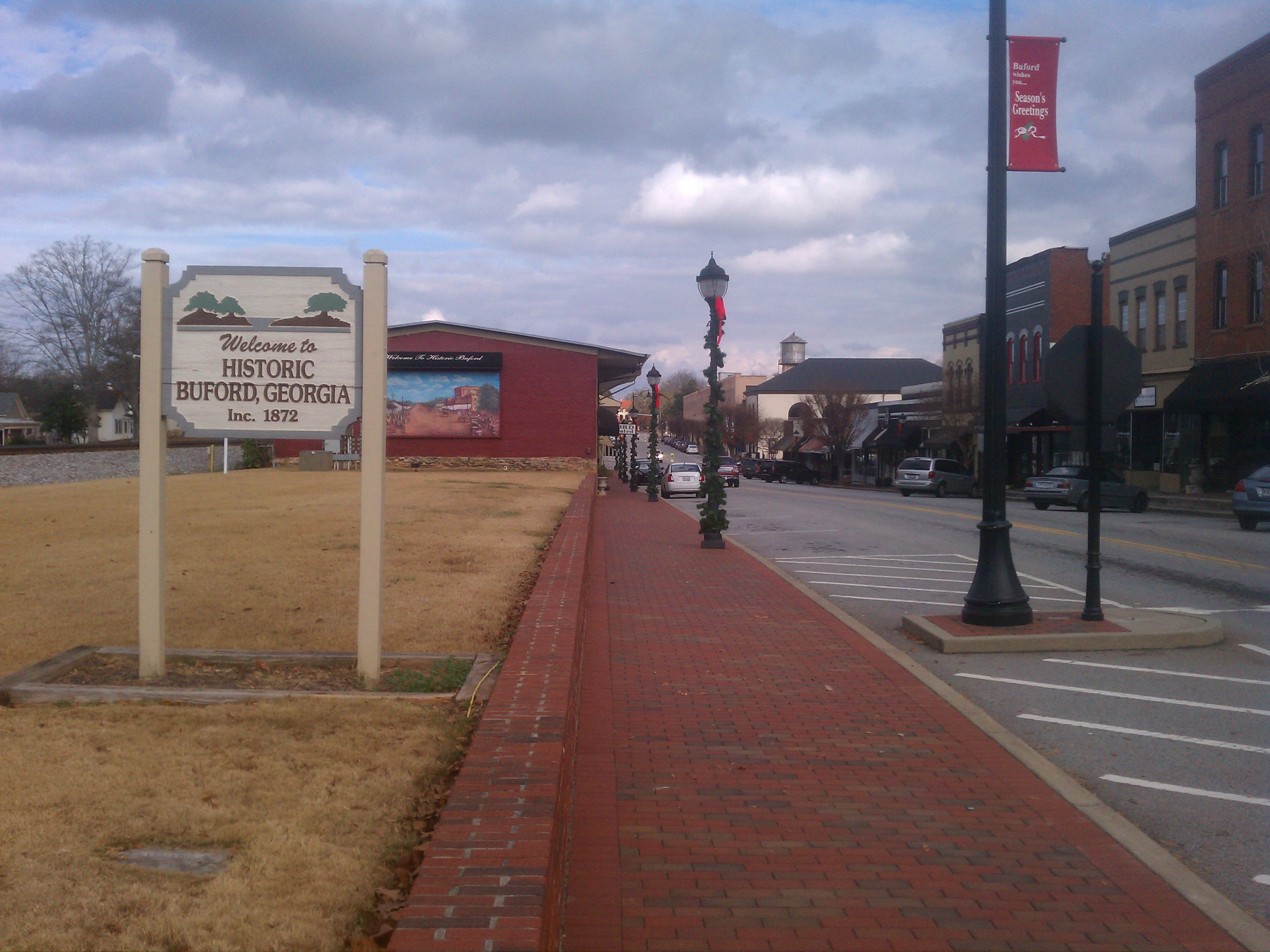
- Main Street
- Interactive map of Buford, Georgia
- Location in Metro Atlanta
- Coordinates: 34°08′11″N 84°01′59″W
- Country: United States
- State: Georgia
- Counties: Gwinnett, Hall
- Incorporated: August 24, 1872; 154 years ago
- Named for: Algernon Sidney Buford

Area
  - Total: 18.22 sq mi (47.18 km^{2})
  - Land: 18.13 sq mi (46.96 km^{2})
  - Water: 0.085 sq mi (0.22 km^{2})
- Elevation: 1,053 ft (321 m)

Population (2020)
  - Total: 17,144
  - Density: 945.5/sq mi (365.05/km^{2})
- Time zone: UTC-5 (Eastern (EST))
  - Summer (DST): UTC-4 (EDT)
- ZIP codes: 30515, 30518, 30519
- Area codes: 770, 678
- FIPS code: 13-11784
- GNIS feature ID: 2403950
- Website: www.cityofbuford.com

Buford is a city in Gwinnett and Hall counties in the U.S. state of Georgia. As of the 2020 census, the city had a population of 17,144. Most of the city is in Gwinnett County, which is part of the Atlanta-Sandy Springs-Marietta Metropolitan Statistical Area. The northern sliver of the city is in Hall County, which comprises the Gainesville, Georgia Metropolitan Statistical Area and is part of the larger Atlanta-Athens-Clarke-Sandy Springs Combined Statistical Area.

The city was founded in 1872 after a railroad was built in the area connecting Charlotte, North Carolina, with Atlanta. Buford was named after Algernon Sidney Buford, who at the time was president of the Atlanta and Richmond Air-Line Railway. The city's leather industry, led by the Bona Allen Company, as well as its location as a railway stop, caused the population to expand during the early 1900s until after the Great Depression had ended.

The city has its own school district, the Buford City School District, and has been the birthplace and home of several musicians and athletes. Various tourist locations, including museums and community centers, the largest mall in the state of Georgia, the Mall of Georgia, and Lake Lanier Islands are in the Buford region.

== History ==
Buford appears in historical records beginning in the early 19th century. The area that is now Buford was originally part of Cherokee territory. Despite the treaty in 1817 that ceded the territory to the United States and Gwinnett County's legislative establishment in 1818, the area was still largely inhabited by the Cherokee until the 1830s. The first non-Native Americans moved to the Buford area in the late 1820s or early 1830s, although the Buford area was not largely settled by them until the 1860s.

During the post-Civil War construction of the extended Richmond and Danville Railroad System in 1865, railroad stockholders Thomas Garner and Larkin Smith purchased land around the railroad's right-of-way and began developing the city of Buford. The city was named after Algernon Sidney Buford, who was president of the Atlanta and Richmond Air-Line Railway during the railroad's construction. The town began rapidly expanding around the railway after its completion in 1871, and it was incorporated as the Town of Buford on August 24, 1872, and renamed the City of Buford in 1896.

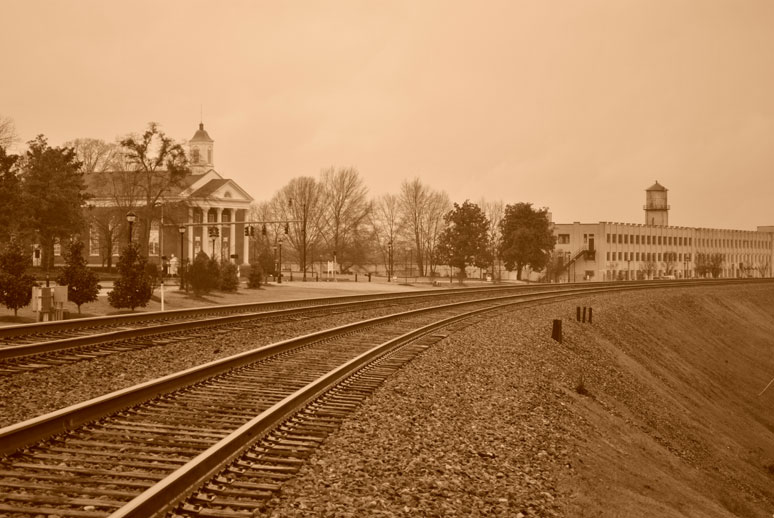
The Bona Allen Shoe and Horse Collar Factory is listed on the National Register of Historic Places.

In the late 1800s and early 1900s Buford became widely known for its leather production, becoming prominently associated with the leather industry and earning the nickname "The Leather City". Buford became a large producer of leather products, including saddles, horse collars, bridles, and shoes. Buford's leather industry began with a leatherworker named R. H. Allen opening a harness shop and tannery in 1868, three years before the completion of the railway and the founding of Buford. R. H. Allen's brother Bona Allen moved to Buford from Rome, Georgia, in 1872 and founded the Bona Allen Company the following year. The leather industry quickly became the city's largest industry despite setbacks from several fires, including a fire in 1903 that destroyed the buildings of several businesses and a fire in 1906 that destroyed a straw storehouse and nearly destroyed the city's harness and horse collar factory.

Bona Allen saddles were available through the Sears mail order catalog, and many Hollywood actors used saddles made by the Bona Allen Company, including cowboy actors Gene Autry, the cast of Bonanza, and Roy Rogers, who used a Bona Allen saddle on his horse Trigger. A statue of Roy Rogers and a Bona Allen saddle-maker saddling Trigger is located in downtown Buford. The Bona Allen Company thrived during the Great Depression in the 1930s, likely as a result of the Depression forcing farmers to choose horses over expensive tractors, thereby increasing the demand for saddles, collars, bridles, and other leather products.

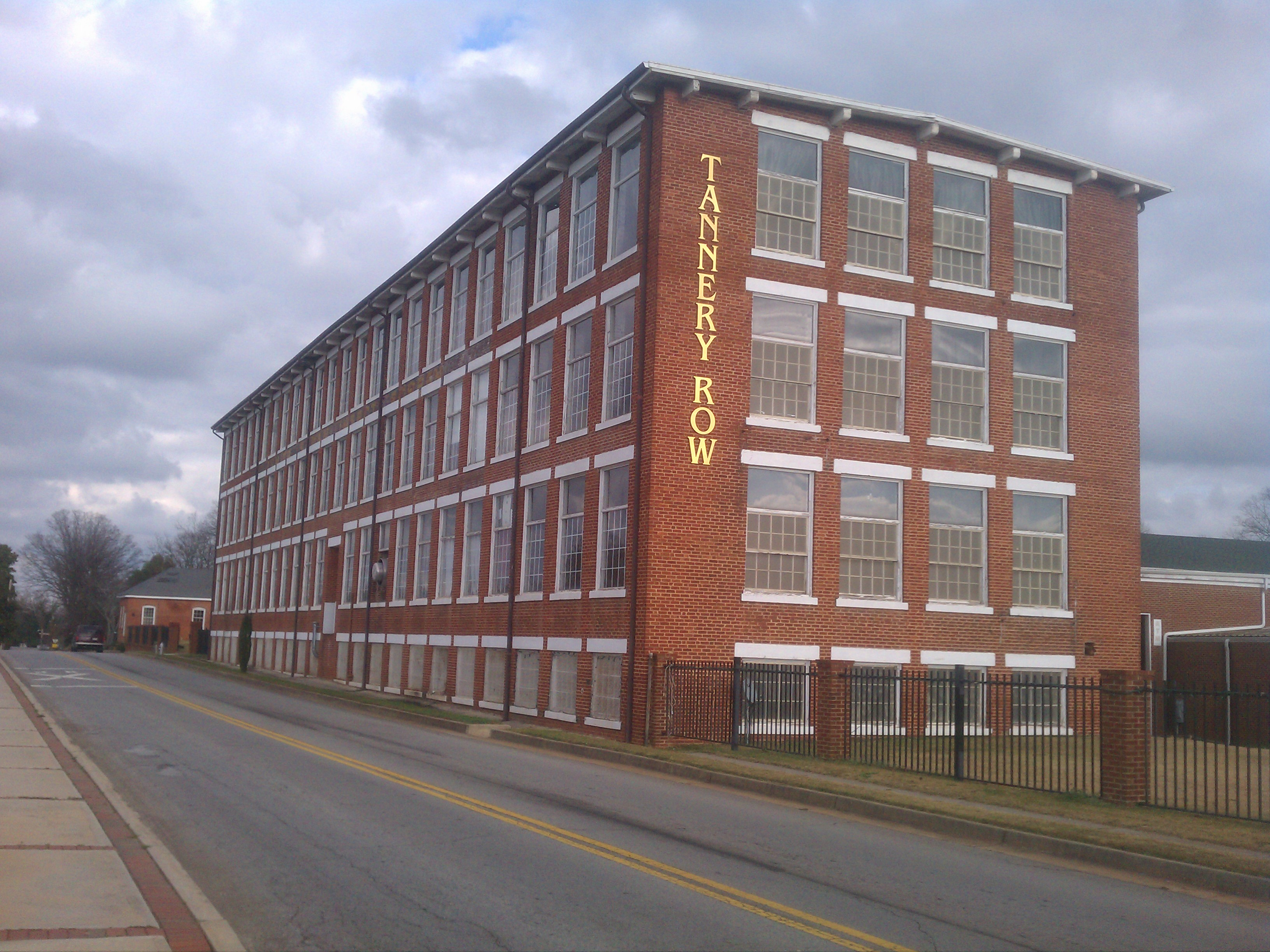
The historic Tannery Row building in downtown Buford

The Bona Allen Company constructed Tannery Row in downtown Buford as a shoe factory in 1919. After a brief employee strike the shoe factory was closed in 1942, although it was briefly reopened by the request of the federal government during World War II to make footwear for the military. Afterwards, the factory closed in 1945. In 2003 Tannery Row became home to the Tannery Row Artist Colony, which houses galleries and studios for artists.

After the Great Depression the use of horses for farming decreased and tractors took their place, and the Bona Allen Company steadily downsized until the tannery was eventually sold to the Tandy Corporation in 1968. Buford's leather industry ended after the tannery experienced a fire in 1981, when the Tandy Corporation decided not to rebuild the tannery and closed the facility.

== Geography ==
Buford, Georgia

Climate chart (precipitation, max. and min. temperature)
J	F	M	A	M	J	J	A	S	O	N	D
5.2 50 32	5.3 54 34	5.2 63 41	3.7 71 48	3.8 77 56	4.1 84 65	4.2 87 69	4.4 86 68	4.6 80 61	3.9 71 51	4.3 62 42	4.7 52 34
- █ Average max. and min. temperatures in °F
- █ Precipitation totals in inches
Metric conversion
J	F	M	A	M	J	J	A	S	O	N	D
131 10 0	134 12 1	133 17 5	94 22 9	97 25 13	105 29 18	107 31 21	112 30 20	116 27 16	99 22 11	110 17 6	118 11 1
- █ Average max. and min. temperatures in °C
- █ Precipitation totals in mm

Buford is located in both northern Gwinnett County in northern Georgia, with a small portion extending north into Hall County. The city is a suburb within the Atlanta metropolitan area. According to the United States Census Bureau, as of 2010 the city has a total land area of 17.09 square miles (44.26 km^{2}), of which 17.01 square miles (44.06 km^{2}) is land and 0.08 square miles (0.20 km^{2}), or 0.44%, is water. The city's elevation is 1,183 feet (361 m).

Buford's city limits are 4.5 miles (7.2 km) west of the Eastern Continental Divide. Ridge Road, part of which uses Buford as a mailing address, runs along the Eastern Continental Divide, although the road itself is outside the city limits. Buford's primary water supply comes from Lake Lanier an impoundment on the Chattahoochee River.

=== Climate ===
The climate of Buford, as with most of the southeastern United States, is humid subtropical (Cfa) according to the Köppen classification, with four seasons including hot, humid summers and cool winters. July is generally the warmest month of the year with an average high of around 87 °F (31 °C). The coldest month is January which has an average high of around 50 °F (10 °C). The highest recorded temperature was 107 °F (42 °C) in 1952, while the lowest recorded temperature was −8 °F (−22 °C) in 1985.

Buford receives rainfall distributed fairly evenly throughout the year as typical of southeastern U.S. cities, with February on average having the highest average precipitation at 5.3 inches (130 mm), and April typically being the driest month with 3.7 inches (94 mm).

== Demographics ==
Historical population
Census	Pop.	Note	%±
1880	896		—
1890	496		−44.6%
1900	1,352		172.6%
1910	1,683		24.5%
1920	2,500		48.5%
1930	3,357		34.3%
1940	4,191		24.8%
1950	3,812		−9.0%
1960	4,168		9.3%
1970	4,640		11.3%
1980	6,578		41.8%
1990	8,771		33.3%
2000	10,668		21.6%
2010	12,225		14.6%
2020	17,144		40.2%
2025 (est.)	18,780	▲	9.5%
U.S. Decennial Census; 2025

=== 2020 census ===
As of the 2020 census, Buford had a population of 17,144. The median age was 35.8 years. 30.2% of residents were under the age of 18 and 12.9% of residents were 65 years of age or older. For every 100 females, there were 96.2 males, and for every 100 females age 18 and over, there were 92.0 males age 18 and over.

100.0% of residents lived in urban areas, while 0.0% lived in rural areas.

There were 5,684 households in Buford, including 3,607 families. Of all households, 46.1% had children under the age of 18 living in them. 51.9% were married-couple households, 16.1% were households with a male householder and no spouse or partner present, and 26.7% were households with a female householder and no spouse or partner present. About 21.1% of all households were made up of individuals, and 9.8% had someone living alone who was 65 years of age or older.

There were 6,085 housing units, of which 6.6% were vacant. The homeowner vacancy rate was 2.6% and the rental vacancy rate was 4.9%.

Buford racial composition as of 2020
Race	Num.	Perc.
White (non-Hispanic)	8,431	49.18%
Black or African American (non-Hispanic)	2,301	13.42%
Native American	24	0.14%
Asian	1,012	5.9%
Pacific Islander	13	0.08%
Other/Mixed	716	4.18%
Hispanic or Latino	4,647	27.11%

== Economy ==
Buford, as with the rest of Gwinnett County, has a sales tax of 6%, which is a combination of the 4% state sales tax and a 2% local tax. In 2008, CNN Money ranked Buford as number 3 in its annual "100 best places to live and start a business" list.

In the late 1800s and early 1900s, Buford's economy was centered on both its location as a railway stop and its leather industry, until demand for leather declined and other transportation options became more readily available over the course of the 1900s, and these industries were no longer a viable part of Buford's economy by the 1980s.

According to the U.S. Census's American Community Survey 2007–2011 5-year estimate, around 65% of Buford's population that are 16 years or older are in the labor force. Of these, around 59% are employed, and 6% are unemployed. The power tool manufacturer Makita operates a factory in Buford with 400 employees. The North American division of Takeuchi Manufacturing was located in Buford from 1999 until 2006, when the company moved to a larger facility in Pendergrass, Georgia.

== Parks and recreation ==
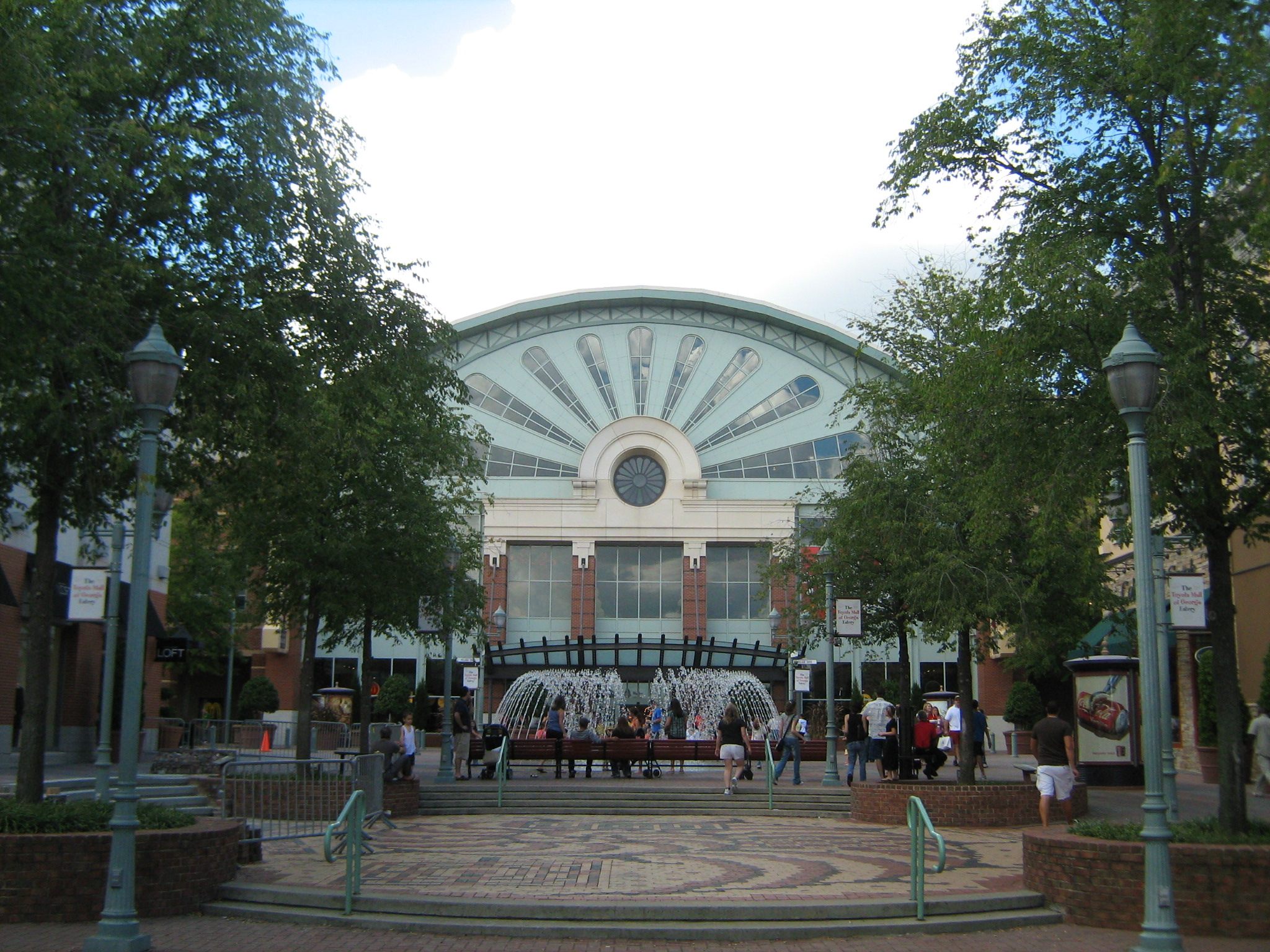
The Mall of Georgia at 3333 Buford Drive in 2007

Buford has several walking trails throughout the city; over 7 miles (11 km) of trails are accessible from both the Gwinnett Environmental & Heritage Center and the Mall of Georgia including a portion of the Ivy Creek Greenway, which runs through the city. Buford has walking trails at Bogan and Buford Dam parks. Bogan Park also has several baseball fields and playgrounds as well as the Bogan Park Community Center and Family Aquatics Center. Buford Dam Park is next to Lake Lanier and has areas for swimming and other recreational activities. In addition to the parks run by Gwinnett County there are five city parks located throughout Buford, and a community center, which was completed in early 2012.

The southern part of Lake Sidney Lanier and the Lake Lanier Islands are also located in Buford.

The Mall of Georgia is the largest mall in Georgia and the 36th largest in the United States, with over 200 stores and a 20 Regal Cinema and IMAX Theaters. While outside the official Buford city limits, the mall uses Buford as its mailing address.

== Government ==
The City of Buford is governed by a three-person city commission government headed by a Commission Chairman. Phillip Beard has served as Buford's Commission Chairman since 1975. When the Town of Buford was incorporated in 1872, a city commission consisting of six commissioners was established to govern the town. When a new city charter was enacted in 1896 that renamed the Town of Buford to the City of Buford, the city commission was replaced with a mayor and six councilmen. The city council governed the City of Buford until a new charter was approved on December 24, 1937, that re-established the city commission government.

The area of Buford inside Gwinnett County is part of Georgia's 7th congressional district while the Hall County portions of Buford belong to Georgia's 9th congressional district. For the state government, the city is part of the Georgia State Senate's 45th and 49th districts, and the 97th, 98th, and 103rd districts for the Georgia House of Representatives.

== Education ==
The Buford City School District has jurisdiction for residents that live within the city limits, while Gwinnett County Public Schools and Hall County Public Schools operate schools for residents that live outside of the city limits. The Buford City School District operates three elementary schools, Buford Academy, Buford Senior Academy, and Buford Elementary, as well as Buford Middle School and Buford High School.

The Buford-Sugar Hill Branch of the Gwinnett County Public Library is located in Buford.

== Arts and culture ==
The Gwinnett Environmental & Heritage Center is a museum and cultural center completed in August 2006 and is located in Buford. The center was created to educate children about both water and environmental resources as well as Gwinnett's cultural heritage, including the county's Cherokee and Creek cultures. The Chesser-Williams House, a historic home which is believed to predate the 1850s and one of the oldest wooden-frame houses in Gwinnett county, was moved to the museum to become part of the museum's cultural exhibits.

Buford Community Center is a multi-purpose facility that was completed in 2012. Located across the street from Buford City Hall, the Buford Community Center has a museum, 290-seat stage theatre, an outdoor amphitheater, and several spaces for meetings, banquets, and weddings.

== Media ==
As part of the Metro Atlanta area, Buford's primary network-affiliated television stations are WXIA-TV (NBC), WANF (CBS), WSB-TV (ABC), and WAGA-TV (Fox). WGTV is the local station of the statewide Georgia Public Television network and is a PBS member station.

Buford is served by the Gwinnett Daily Post, which is the most widely distributed newspaper in Buford as well as Gwinnett county's legal organ. The Atlanta Journal-Constitution, Gainesville Times, and North Gwinnett Voice are also distributed in Buford. During the late 1800s, the city of Buford had a number of local newspapers including the Buford Gazette and the Buford Herald, none of which gained consistent widespread use in the city. The weekly Gwinnett Herald served Buford until 1885.

Several movies have been filmed in and around Buford including the 2010 film Killers, Need for Speed, Blended, Charlie and the Chocolate Factory and A Simple Twist of Fate.

== Infrastructure ==
=== Transportation ===
Two major interstate highways pass through Buford: Interstate 85 and Interstate 985 both travel through the city in a general northeast–southwest direction. Buford is Exit 115 on I-85 and Exit 4 on I-985. Georgia State Route 20 travels through Buford in a general northwest–southeast direction. U.S. Route 23 travels northeast into Buford before first merging with State Route 20 towards the southeast and then with I-985 towards the northeast.

Ride Gwinnett provides public transportation in Buford and Gwinnett County, and GRTA Xpress operates a Park and Ride in Buford that commutes to Atlanta.

As late as 1971 the Southern Railway's Piedmont made a southbound stop in Buford on a Washington-Atlanta running passenger run. Until 1967 or 1968 the Southern Railway was running an unnamed northbound successor train to its Peach Queen that made a flag stop in Buford.

The nearest airport is the Gwinnett County Airport in the city of Lawrenceville, a small public airport with a single asphalt runway 14 miles (23 km) from Buford. The closest major airports are Hartsfield–Jackson Atlanta International Airport, which is 48 miles (77 km) from Buford and Athens Ben Epps Airport, which is 53 miles (85 km).

=== Health care ===
Buford has several clinics and family doctors, including an Emory Healthcare clinic and a Northside Hospital imaging center, but no major hospitals inside the city limits. The closest hospital is Northside Hospital-Forsyth, which is 9 miles (14 km) away in Cumming. Gwinnett Medical Center and Emory Johns Creek Hospital are both 12 miles (19 km) from Buford, in Lawrenceville and Johns Creek respectively. Northeast Georgia Health System has a hospital in Gainesville and Braselton.

== Notable people ==
Buford is home to several Atlanta Falcons players, including defensive tackle Corey Peters and cornerback Chris Owens. Former Falcons players Jeff Merrow, who played for the Falcons from 1975 to 1983, also lives in Buford, and Scott Case, a former NFL defensive back from 1984 to 1995 for the Falcons and Dallas Cowboys, also lives in Buford. Other athletes who live in Buford include retired hockey player Randy Manery, professional drag racing driver Kurt Johnson, and professional baseball pitcher Jon Huber. Professional baseball player Jerry McQuaig died in 2001. Roy Carlyle, who was a Major League Baseball outfielder between 1925 and 1926 for the Washington Senators (1925), Boston Red Sox (1925–26), and New York Yankees (1926), was born in Buford. Soccer player Luke Biasi was also born here.

Several professional athletes have graduated from Buford High School, including wide receiver P. K. Sam and his younger brother quarterback Lorne Sam, as well as professional WNBA player Christi Thomas. Brownie Wise, saleswoman largely responsible for the success of Tupperware, was born in Buford, as was semi-retired professional wrestler and trainer Steve Lawler.

Several musicians live in Buford, including Widespread Panic guitarist Jimmy Herring and De'Angelo Holmes of the hip-hop duo Ying Yang Twins. Grammy Award-winning songwriter Joe South lived in Buford before his death on September 5, 2012.
