= Suwanee, Georgia =

City in Georgia, United States

- City
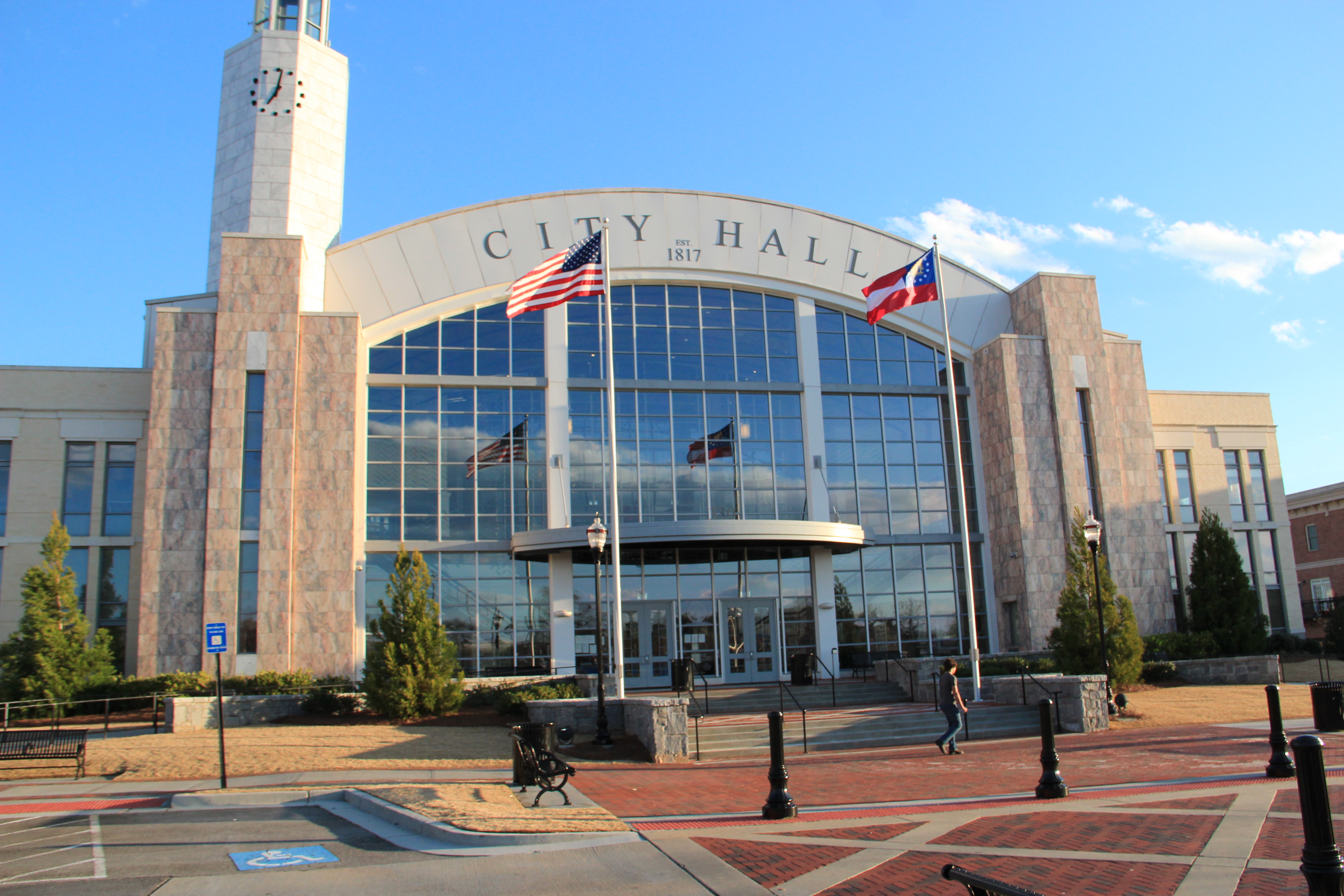
- Suwanee City Hall

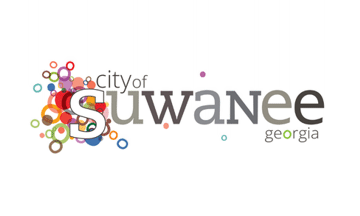
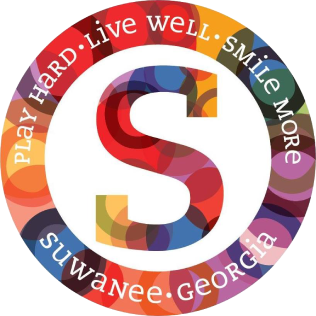
- Flag Seal Logo
- Motto: "Crossroads of Past & Future"
- Coordinates: 34°03′03″N 84°04′07″W
- Country: United States
- State: Georgia
- County: Gwinnett

Area
  - Total: 11.07 sq mi (28.66 km^{2})
  - Land: 10.99 sq mi (28.46 km^{2})
  - Water: 0.077 sq mi (0.20 km^{2})
- Elevation: 1,004 ft (306 m)

Population (2020)
  - Total: 20,786
  - Density: 1,891.4/sq mi (730.29/km^{2})
- Time zone: UTC-5 (Eastern (EST))
  - Summer (DST): UTC-4 (EDT)
- ZIP code: 30024
- Area code: 770
- FIPS code: 13-74936
- GNIS feature ID: 2405551
- Website: suwanee.com

Suwanee is a city in the northern section of Gwinnett County in the U.S. state of Georgia. As of the 2010 census, the population was 15,355; this had grown to an estimated 20,907 as of 2019. In 2020, its population was 20,786.

Portions of Forsyth and Fulton counties also have Suwanee and its ZIP code (30024) as a mailing address.

== History ==
=== Early history ===
Suwanee, like many towns in Georgia, has its roots based in the name of Native American with this name being from the Shawnee and a former Shawnee area. Settlement always thrived along the Chattahoochee River, where various societies flourished. The city was officially recognized by the U.S. government in 1837, following the establishment of a post office. With the construction of the Georgia Air Line Railroad in 1871, and the Rhodes House hotel in 1880 to accommodate railroad passengers, Suwanee saw in influx of people and a boost in trade and economic activity. Suwanee Methodist Church was established in 1873, serving both the local Methodist and Baptist congregations. Although a devastating fire in 1881 spared only one building on Main Street, the town continued to persevere. From 1880 to 1920, the population remained relatively static, growing from 216 people to 241 over 40 years. As of 2015, Suwanee's population had surged to over 18,000, reflecting its growth and development.

=== Recent history ===
From 1933 to 1936, the now heavily traveled Buford Highway was constructed through Suwanee. In 1960, Interstate 85 was extended just south of Suwanee, where it ended at the time. Over the past century, several primary education schools have opened in Suwanee, including North Gwinnett High School and Suwanee Elementary School. Suwanee High School dates back to 1880, when it was a one-room schoolhouse. The first city hall was built in the early 1960s, with a second city hall constructed in 1997. In 2005, Town Center was built in 2005 and completed in 2009, at which time the city hall moved to its current location in Town Center. In 2003, Suwanee was named a City of Excellence by the Georgia Municipal Association and Trend Magazine. In 2017, Suwanee was recognized as a Green Community by the Atlanta Regional Commission, earning bronze-level certification for its commitment to environmental stewardship and leadership in sustainability practices.

== Geography ==
Suwanee is situated in northern Gwinnett County and southeastern Forsyth County. It is bordered to the northeast by the city of Sugar Hill, to the southwest by the city of Duluth, and on the west by the Chattahoochee River, which marks the Fulton County border. Across the river lies the city of Johns Creek.

According to the United States Census Bureau, Suwanee has a total area of 11.0 square miles (28.4 km^{2}), of which 10.9 square miles (28.2 km^{2}) is land and 0.1 square miles (0.2 km^{2}), or 0.70%, is water.

There are several areas with Suwanee postal addresses that lie in unincorporated Gwinnett County and unincorporated Forsyth County. Those areas are not within the Suwanee corporate limits.

=== Climate ===
Suwanee experiences a humid subtropical climate (Köppen climate classification Cfa), characterized by mild winters and hot, humid summers.

Climate data for Suwanee, Georgia
Month	Jan	Feb	Mar	Apr	May	Jun	Jul	Aug	Sep	Oct	Nov	Dec	Year
Mean daily maximum °F (°C)	49 (9)	54 (12)	62 (17)	70 (21)	77 (25)	84 (29)	87 (31)	86 (30)	80 (27)	71 (22)	61 (16)	51 (11)	69 (21)
Mean daily minimum °F (°C)	28 (−2)	32 (0)	38 (3)	46 (8)	55 (13)	64 (18)	68 (20)	67 (19)	60 (16)	48 (9)	38 (3)	31 (−1)	48 (9)
Average precipitation inches (mm)	4.40 (112)	5.24 (133)	5.16 (131)	3.68 (93)	4.49 (114)	4.00 (102)	4.23 (107)	5.28 (134)	4.41 (112)	3.73 (95)	4.19 (106)	4.41 (112)	53.22 (1,351)

== Demographics ==
Historical population
Census	Pop.	Note	%±
1880	215		—
1890	166		−22.8%
1900	247		48.8%
1910	250		1.2%
1920	246		−1.6%
1930	214		−13.0%
1940	179		−16.4%
1950	357		99.4%
1960	541		51.5%
1970	615		13.7%
1980	1,026		66.8%
1990	2,412		135.1%
2000	8,725		261.7%
2010	15,355		76.0%
2020	20,786		35.4%
2025 (est.)	23,034	▲	10.8%
U.S. Decennial Census; 2025

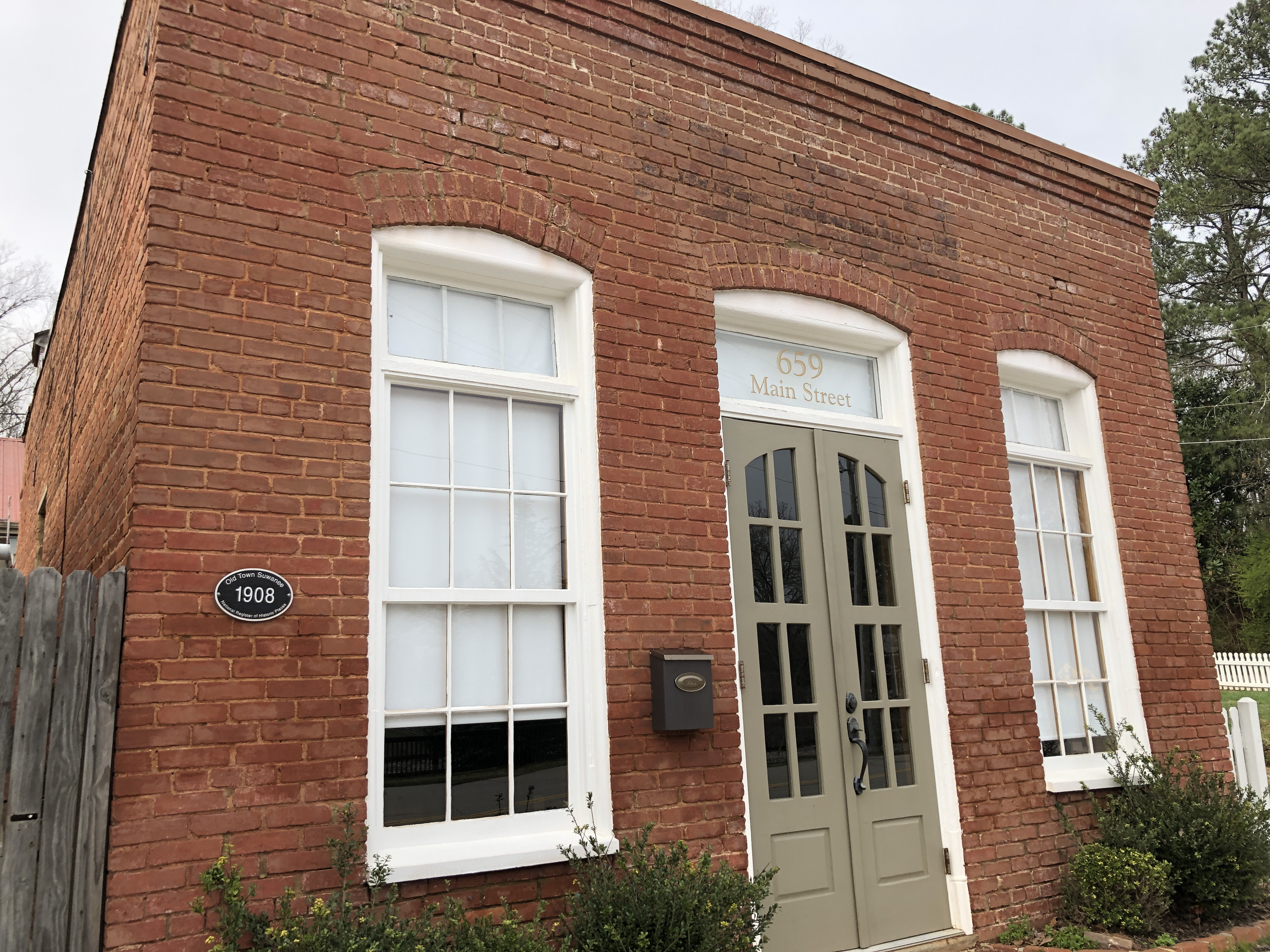
Building in Old Town Suwanee

=== 2020 census ===
As of the 2020 census, Suwanee had a population of 20,786 and 5,235 families. The median age was 38.7 years. 25.0% of residents were under the age of 18 and 10.9% of residents were 65 years of age or older. For every 100 females there were 91.5 males, and for every 100 females age 18 and over there were 88.3 males age 18 and over.

100.0% of residents lived in urban areas, while 0.0% lived in rural areas.

There were 7,506 households in Suwanee, of which 40.7% had children under the age of 18 living in them. Of all households, 55.2% were married-couple households, 15.0% were households with a male householder and no spouse or partner present, and 25.8% were households with a female householder and no spouse or partner present. About 21.6% of all households were made up of individuals and 5.8% had someone living alone who was 65 years of age or older.

There were 7,861 housing units, of which 4.5% were vacant. The homeowner vacancy rate was 1.4% and the rental vacancy rate was 6.2%.

Racial composition as of the 2020 census
Race	Number	Percent
White	9,994	48.1%
Black or African American	3,006	14.5%
American Indian and Alaska Native	94	0.5%
Asian	5,266	25.3%
Native Hawaiian and Other Pacific Islander	11	0.1%
Some other race	672	3.2%
Two or more races	1,743	8.4%
Hispanic or Latino (of any race)	1,832	8.8%

== Arts and culture ==
Gwinnett County Public Library operates the Suwanee branch in Suwanee.

== Sports ==
Suwanee was the practicing home of the Atlanta Falcons football team from 1979 to 2001.

== Parks and recreation ==
George Pierce Park is a 304-acre (123 ha) park in Suwanee managed by Gwinnett County. The city itself manages several parks within the city limits, including Town Center on Main, a 13-acre (5.3 ha) park that serves as a venue for special events. Suwanee Creek Greenway is a hard-surfaced multipurpose 4-mile (6.4 km) trail with wooded areas and wildlife habitat connected to several of the city's parks.

Each February, Suwanee hosts the annual Suwanee Half Marathon, a qualifier for the Peachtree Road Race.

In 2016, Suwanee unveiled the first bike share program in Gwinnett County.

== Education ==
Suwanee is within the Gwinnett County Public Schools district, and primarily served by Collins Hill High School, North Gwinnett High School, and Peachtree Ridge High School. The Philadelphia College of Osteopathic Medicine's Georgia campus is also located in Suwanee.

== Infrastructure ==
=== Transportation ===
==== Major roads and expressways ====
- Interstate 85
- U.S. Route 23
- State Route 317

==== Airport ====
The nearest commercial air service is provided by Hartsfield–Jackson Atlanta International Airport, which is south of Atlanta. The nearest general aviation airport is Gwinnett County Airport.

== Notable people ==
- Carolyn Bourdeaux, former U.S. representative
- Rich McCormick, U.S. representative
- Devin Vassell, NBA player
