= George Pierce Park =

Park in Suwanee, Georgia, United States

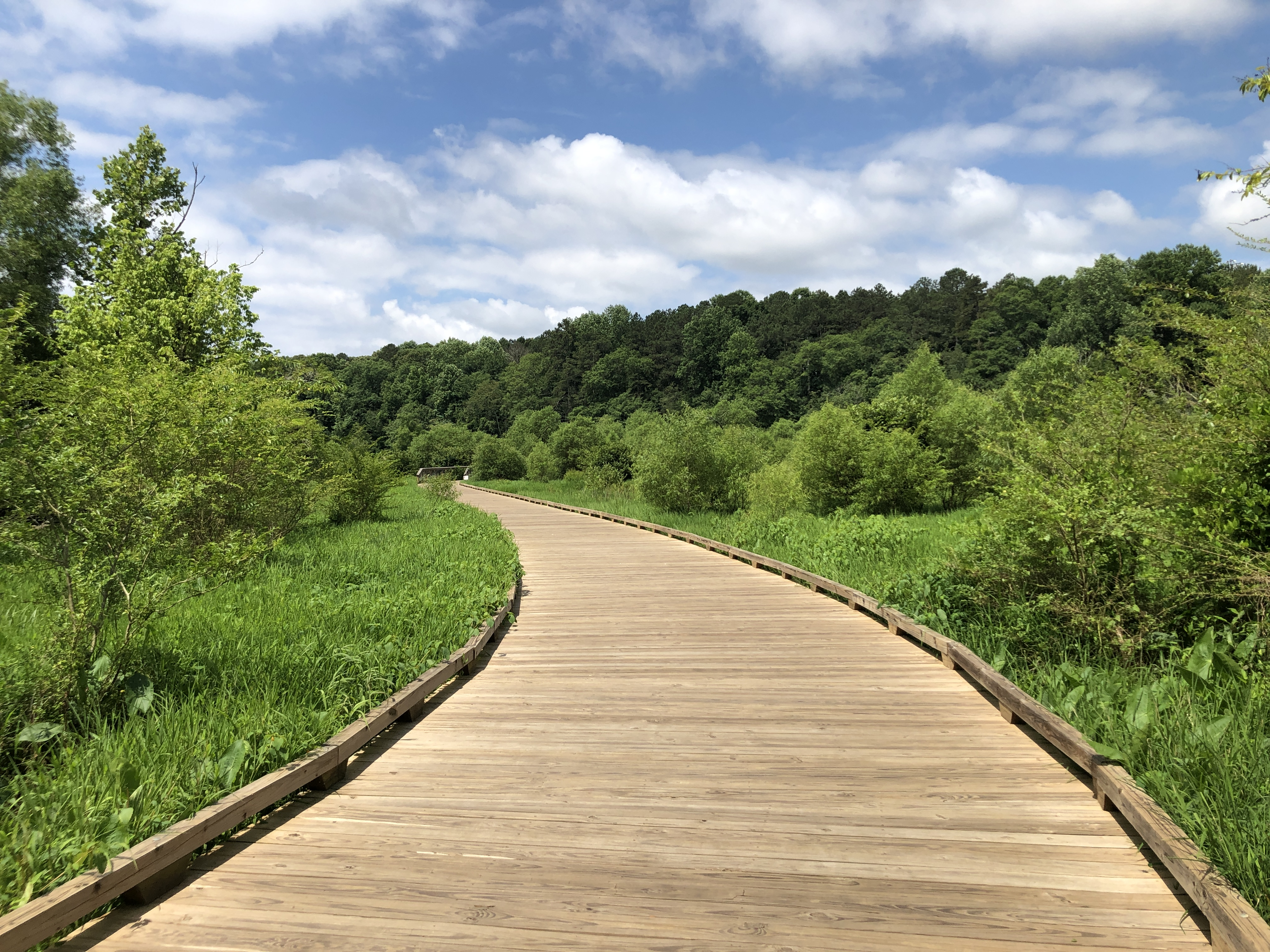
- Ivy Creek Greenway in George Pierce Park
- Interactive map of George Pierce Park
- Type: Multi-use
- Location: 55 Buford Highway, Suwanee, Gwinnett County
- Nearest city: Suwanee, Georgia
- Area: 304 acres (1.23 km^{2})
- Open: All year

George Pierce Park is the largest city park in Suwanee, Georgia. It is a 304-acre (1.23 km^{2}) park near the northern edge of the city. Included in the park are jogging and cycling paths, playgrounds, basketball courts, soccer fields, baseball fields, a pond and a senior learning center.

== Trails ==
- Ivy Creek Greenway runs east of the park. It is currently partially complete and will connect the park to Buford, the Mall of Georgia area, nearby neighborhoods, schools and businesses.
- Suwanee Creek Greenway runs south of the park and connects to Suwanee Town Center, Suwanee Creek Park, nearby neighborhoods, schools and businesses. Phase III of the Western Gwinnett Bikeway includes plans for a spur trail to be added to further connect to the bikeway.

== Amenities ==
This park offers a plethora of amenities and they are generally open from 9am to 8pm, except for Saturdays and Sundays. Amenities include 304 acres, Prime Timers Pointe, community recreation center, Gwinnett Senior Learning Center, outdoor basketball courts, playground, five soccer fields, football/multi-purpose field, seven youth baseball/softball fields, two adult softball fields, pavilions, public restrooms, 2.6-mile paved multi-purpose trail, 1.2-mile soft surface trail, grills and a pond.

In 2016, Commissioners approved a $3.2 million contract to build an 18,212-square-foot gymnasium at the park. The gymnasium will be built as an extension of the park’s Community Recreation Center and feature a full-sized basketball court and an elevated indoor track. The goal of this addition to the park was to enhance the parkgoers' experience as well as create more outlets for activity in Suwanee, Georgia.

== Youth Sports ==
=== Baseball & Softball ===
North Gwinnett Baseball Softball Association is a 501(c)(3) tax-exempt non-profit organization managing the recreational, travel baseball and softball programs out of George Pierce Park. The organization serves youth players ages 4–18 in the North Gwinnett area.

=== Basketball ===
The North Gwinnett Basketball Association, Inc. organizes and manages a recreational basketball program.

=== Football ===
The North Gwinnett Football Association offers youth football and is a member of the Gwinnett Football League.

=== Soccer ===
The Atlanta Fire United is a soccer club focusing on youth development. It offers recreational soccer, academy and select programs as well as Super Y-League, Futsal and an adult program. It was founded in 1980.
