= GRTA Xpress =

Regional commuter coach service in Georgia, U.S.

Xpress

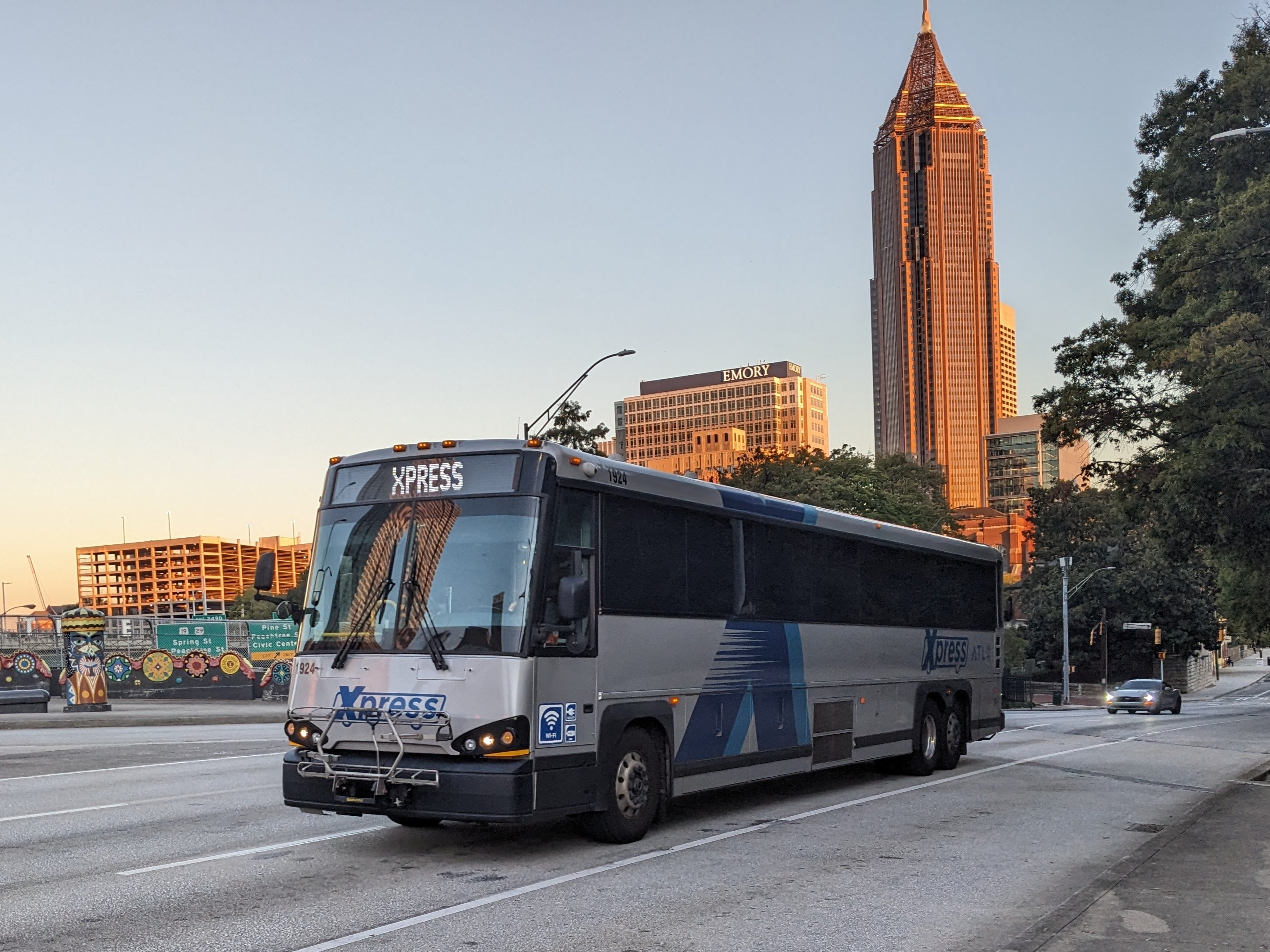
- Parent: Georgia Transportation Efficiency Authority
- Commenced operation: June 7, 2004
- Headquarters: 245 Peachtree Center Ave; Atlanta, Georgia
- Service area: Metro Atlanta, Georgia
- Service type: express bus service
- Routes: 15
- Daily ridership: 4,400 (weekdays, Q2 2026)
- Annual ridership: 1,094,600 (2025)
- Operator: Transdev and CobbLinc
- Website: www.xpressga.com

Xpress is a regional commuter bus system serving the Atlanta Metropolitan area in the U.S. state of Georgia. The system has 15 routes and 20 active park-and-ride lots. In 2025, the Xpress system had a ridership of 1,094,600, or about 4,400 per weekday as of the second quarter of 2026.

Xpress began service on June 7, 2004 under the Georgia Regional Transportation Authority, and was subsequently operated by the Atlanta-Region Transit Link Authority before transferring to the Georgia Transportation Efficiency Authority (GTEA) upon ATL's dissolution in May 2026. Service operates from roughly 5:30 a.m. to 9:30 pm weekdays, with most service being rush-hour only.

== History ==
Creation of regional bus service in Atlanta began in 1999, when the Atlanta Regional Commission created a new transportation network plan to bring metro Atlanta back into compliance with the U.S. Clean Air Act and regain federal road construction funding. The bus system began serious development in 2001 after then-Governor Roy Barnes announced that the State Road and Tollway Authority (SRTA) would issue $8.5 billion in bonds, of which 55% was for mass transit.

In January 2002, Georgia Regional Transportation Authority (GRTA) offered 13 metro-Atlanta counties funding for road projects if they agreed to pay to operate the regional bus system for five years. Only Fayette and Cherokee counties refused the deal. Funding for the system faced issues in September after a 20-year SRTA bond was challenged in court by a group opposing the construction of the Northern Arc, which argued that the bond program violated the state constitution by bypassing the General Assembly. The bond program ended up being cancelled by the following governor, Sonny Perdue, who opted to rely on loans from the state legislature.

In June 2003, the GRTA authorized the purchase of 58 buses for the system. In months leading up to service, GRTA faced pushback from Central Atlanta Progress and Midtown Alliance, who argued that the presence of large coach buses would undermine efforts to improve pedestrian experience on Peachtree Street and that buses should be routed along adjacent one-way streets. Service began on June 7, 2004 and was met with protests from pedestrian activists. A month after service started, activists and GRTA agreed on a plan to move buses from Peachtree Street onto West Peachtree Street.

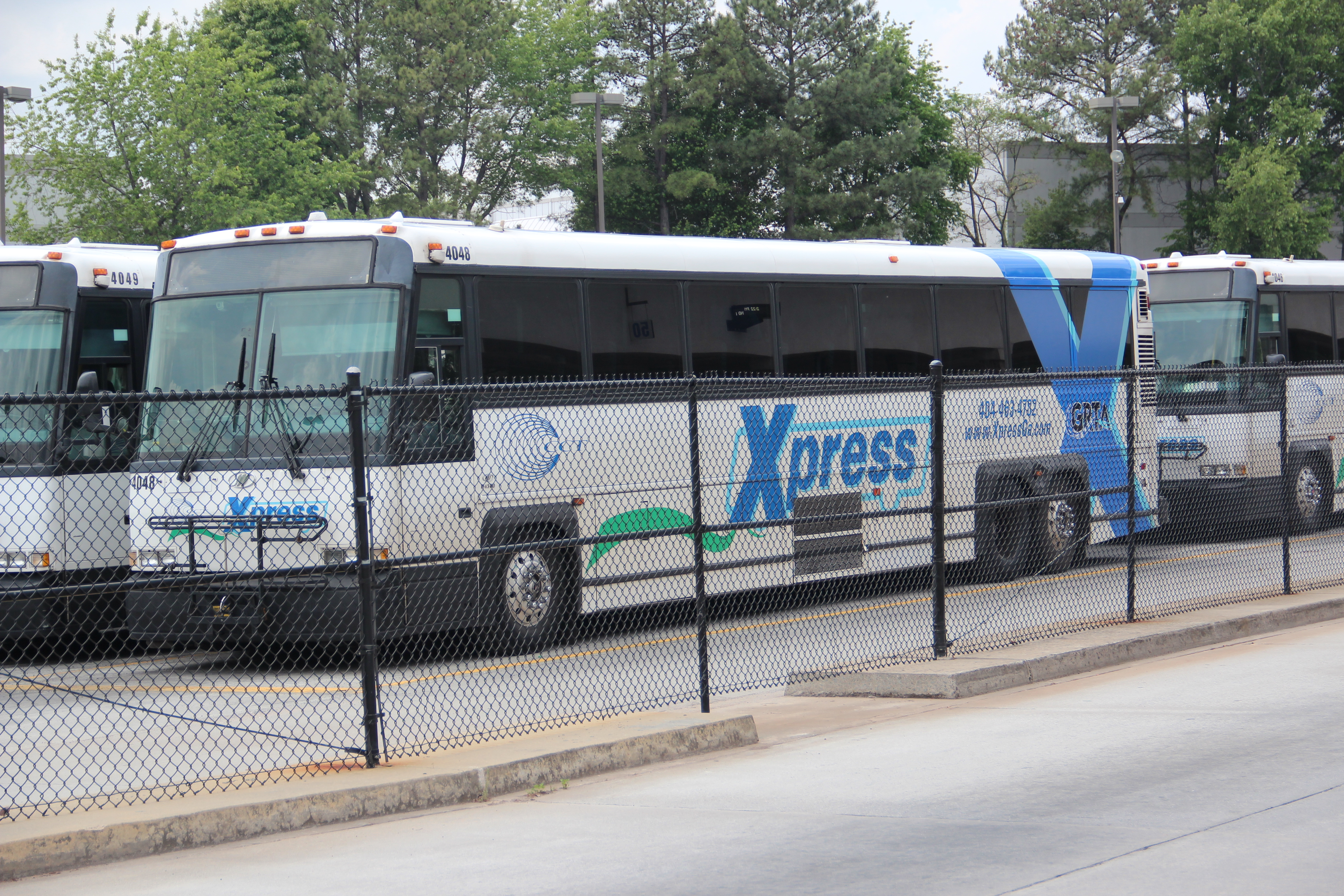
A GRTA Xpress bus in Cobb County in 2017

Xpress saw severe overcrowding on some routes during a period of record high gas prices in 2008. But in 2010, the system saw its first budget crisis, raising pass prices and fares for routes over 25 miles to try to make up the difference. In 2015, GRTA approved the first major redesign of the system, adjusting departure times and stops on all routes, cutting one route, and adding three cross-suburb routes terminating at Perimeter Center.

On July 1, 2020, Xpress operations were transferred from GRTA to the Atlanta-region Transit Link Authority (ATL), as legally mandated by the legislation creating ATL. On June 16 2025, Xpress service was reduced from 27 routes to 15 routes to cut costs as a result of ridership only recovering to 30% of pre-pandemic levels.

On May 12, 2026, the ATL was dissolved when Governor Brian Kemp signed HB 297, transferring Xpress operations to the newly created Georgia Transportation Efficiency Authority (GTEA).

== Routes ==
As of June 2025, the Xpress network includes 15 routes.

Route	Name	Terminals			Major streets traveled	Service notes
401	Cumming / Perimeter to Medical Center	Cumming Cumming Park and Ride	→ AM ← PM	Pill Hill Medical Center station	GA-400	
411	Buford / Sugarloaf Mills to Downtown	Buford Buford Park and Ride	→ AM ← PM	Downtown Atlanta Forsyth Street at MLK Jr Drive	I-985, I-85, Courtland Street/Peachtree Center Avenue	The last inbound trip begins at Sugarloaf Mills Ride Gwinnett Park and Ride
412	Buford / Sugarloaf Mills to Midtown	Buford Buford Park and Ride	→ AM	Midtown Atlanta Arts Center station	I-985, I-85, West Peachtree Street	Buses in both directions serve Civic Center first, followed by Arts Center
412	Buford / Sugarloaf Mills to Midtown	Buford Buford Park and Ride	← PM	SoNo Civic Center station	I-985, I-85, West Peachtree Street	Buses in both directions serve Civic Center first, followed by Arts Center
413	Hamilton Mill / Sugarloaf Mills to Downtown	Hamilton Mill Hamilton Mill Park and Ride	→ AM ← PM	Downtown Atlanta Forsyth Street at MLK Jr Drive	I-85, Courtland Street/Peachtree Center Avenue	
414	Hamilton Mill / Sugarloaf Mills to Midtown	Hamilton Mill Hamilton Mill Park and Ride	→ AM	Midtown Atlanta Arts Center station	I-85, Peachtree Street	Buses in both directions serve Civic Center first, followed by Arts Center
414	Hamilton Mill / Sugarloaf Mills to Midtown	Hamilton Mill Hamilton Mill Park and Ride	← PM	SoNo Civic Center station	I-85, Peachtree Street	Buses in both directions serve Civic Center first, followed by Arts Center
415	Sugarloaf Mill / Indian Trail to Emory	Lawrenceville Sugarloaf Mills Ride Gwinnett Park and Ride	→ AM	Emory University Woodruff Circle Emory	I-85, North Druid Hills Road, Briarcliff Road	Buses in both directions serve 1762 Clifton Roads first, followed by Woodruff Circle Emory
415	Sugarloaf Mill / Indian Trail to Emory	Lawrenceville Sugarloaf Mills Ride Gwinnett Park and Ride	← PM	Druid Hills 1762 Clifton Road	I-85, North Druid Hills Road, Briarcliff Road	Buses in both directions serve 1762 Clifton Roads first, followed by Woodruff Circle Emory
416	Dacula / Indian Trail to Downtown	Dacula Dacula Park and Ride	→ AM ← PM	Downtown Atlanta Forsyth Street at MLK Jr Drive	GA-316, I-85, Courtland Street/Peachtree Center Avenue	
419	Snellville / Hewatt Road to Downtown / Midtown	Snellville Snellville Park and Ride	→ AM	Midtown Atlanta Spring Street and Linden Avenue	US-78, I-20, Peachtree Center Avenue, West Peachtree Street, Spring Street	
419	Snellville / Hewatt Road to Downtown / Midtown	Snellville Snellville Park and Ride	← PM	SoNo Civic Center station	West Peachtree Street, Spring Street, Courtland Street, I-20, US-78	
426	West Conyers / Panola Road to Downtown / Midtown	Conyers West Conyers Park and Ride	→ AM	Midtown Atlanta Spring Street and Linden Avenue	I-20, Peachtree Center Avenue, West Peachtree Street, Spring Street	
426	West Conyers / Panola Road to Downtown / Midtown	Conyers West Conyers Park and Ride	← PM	SoNo Civic Center station	West Peachtree Street, Spring Street, Courtland Street, I-20	
430	McDonough / Stockbridge to Downtown / Midtown	McDonough McDonough Park and Ride	→ AM	Midtown Atlanta Spring Street and Linden Avenue	I-75, Peachtree Center Avenue, West Peachtree Street, Spring Street	
430	McDonough / Stockbridge to Downtown / Midtown	McDonough McDonough Park and Ride	← PM	SoNo Civic Center station	West Peachtree Street, Spring Street, Courtland Street, I-75	
441	Jonesboro to Downtown / Midtown	Jonesboro Jonesboro Park and Ride	→ AM	Midtown Atlanta Spring Street and Linden Avenue	US-41/US-19, I-75, Peachtree Center Avenue, West Peachtree Street, Spring Street	
441	Jonesboro to Downtown / Midtown	Jonesboro Jonesboro Park and Ride	← PM	SoNo Civic Center station	West Peachtree Street, Spring Street, Courtland Street, I-75, US-41/US-19	
453	Newnan to Lakewood/Fort McPherson	Newnan Newnan Park and Ride	→ AM ← PM	Lakewood Lakewood/Fort McPherson station	I-85	
463	West Douglas / Douglas MMTC to Downtown/Midtown	Douglas West Douglas Park and Ride	→ AM	Midtown Atlanta Spring Street and Linden Avenue	I-20, Peachtree Center Avenue, West Peachtree Street, Spring Street	
463	West Douglas / Douglas MMTC to Downtown/Midtown	Douglas West Douglas Park and Ride	← PM	SoNo Civic Center station	West Peachtree Street, Spring Street, Courtland Street, I-20	
476	Hiram / Powder Springs to Downtown / Midtown	Hiram Hiram Park and Ride	→ AM	Midtown Atlanta Spring Street and Linden Avenue	US-278/GA-9, I-20, Peachtree Center Avenue, West Peachtree Street, Spring Street	
476	Hiram / Powder Springs to Downtown / Midtown	Hiram Hiram Park and Ride	← PM	SoNo Civic Center station	West Peachtree Street, Spring Street, Courtland Street, I-20, US-278/GA-9	
484	Hickory Grove / Town Center / Big Shanty to Midtown	Acworth Hickory Grove Park and Ride	→ AM	Midtown Atlanta Arts Center station	I-75, Peachtree Street	Buses in both directions serve Civic Center first, followed by Arts Center
484	Hickory Grove / Town Center / Big Shanty to Midtown	Acworth Hickory Grove Park and Ride	← PM	SoNo Civic Center station	I-75, Peachtree Street	Buses in both directions serve Civic Center first, followed by Arts Center

== Operations ==
As of 2025, Xpress is operated by Transdev and CobbLinc. Prior to the creation of the Atlanta-region Transit Link Authority, Xpress was operated as a partnership between the Georgia Regional Transportation Authority (GRTA) and Clayton, Cherokee, Cobb, DeKalb, Douglas, Forsyth, Fulton, Gwinnett, Henry, Paulding, and Rockdale counties. Operators of Xpress were contracted through Professional Transit Management and American Coach. In Cobb and Gwinnett Counties CobbLinc or Ride Gwinnett provided Xpress service in addition to their own express services.

== Fares ==
Xpress charges fares based on distance travelled. As of April 2025, adult one-way fares from Green Zone park and rides to Atlanta are $3.00 and fares from Blue Zone park-and-rides to Atlanta are $4.00. Round-trip, 10-trip, and 31-day passes are available using a Breeze card or app.

== See also ==
- Transportation in Atlanta
- List of bus transit systems in the United States
