= Transportation in Atlanta =

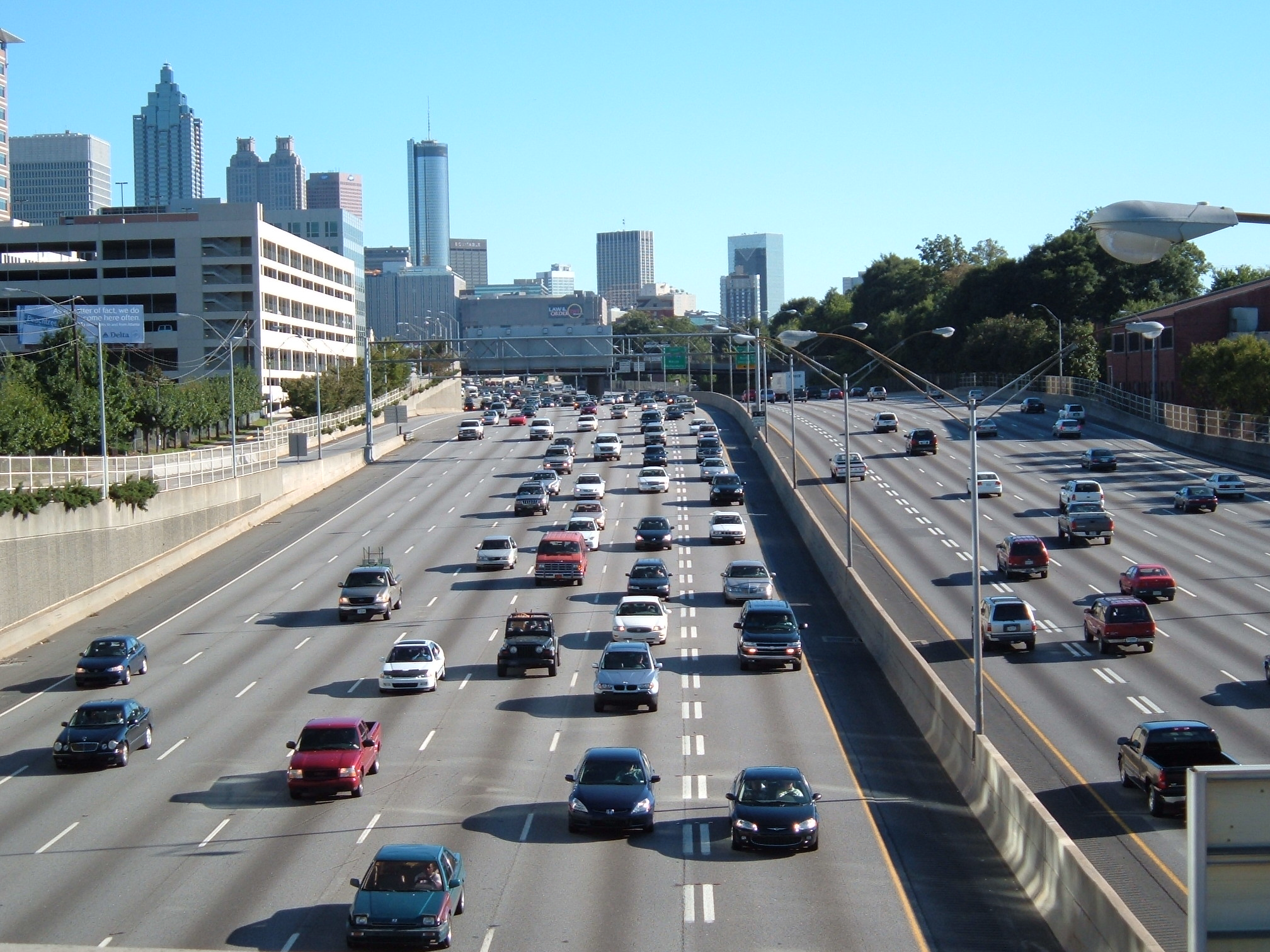
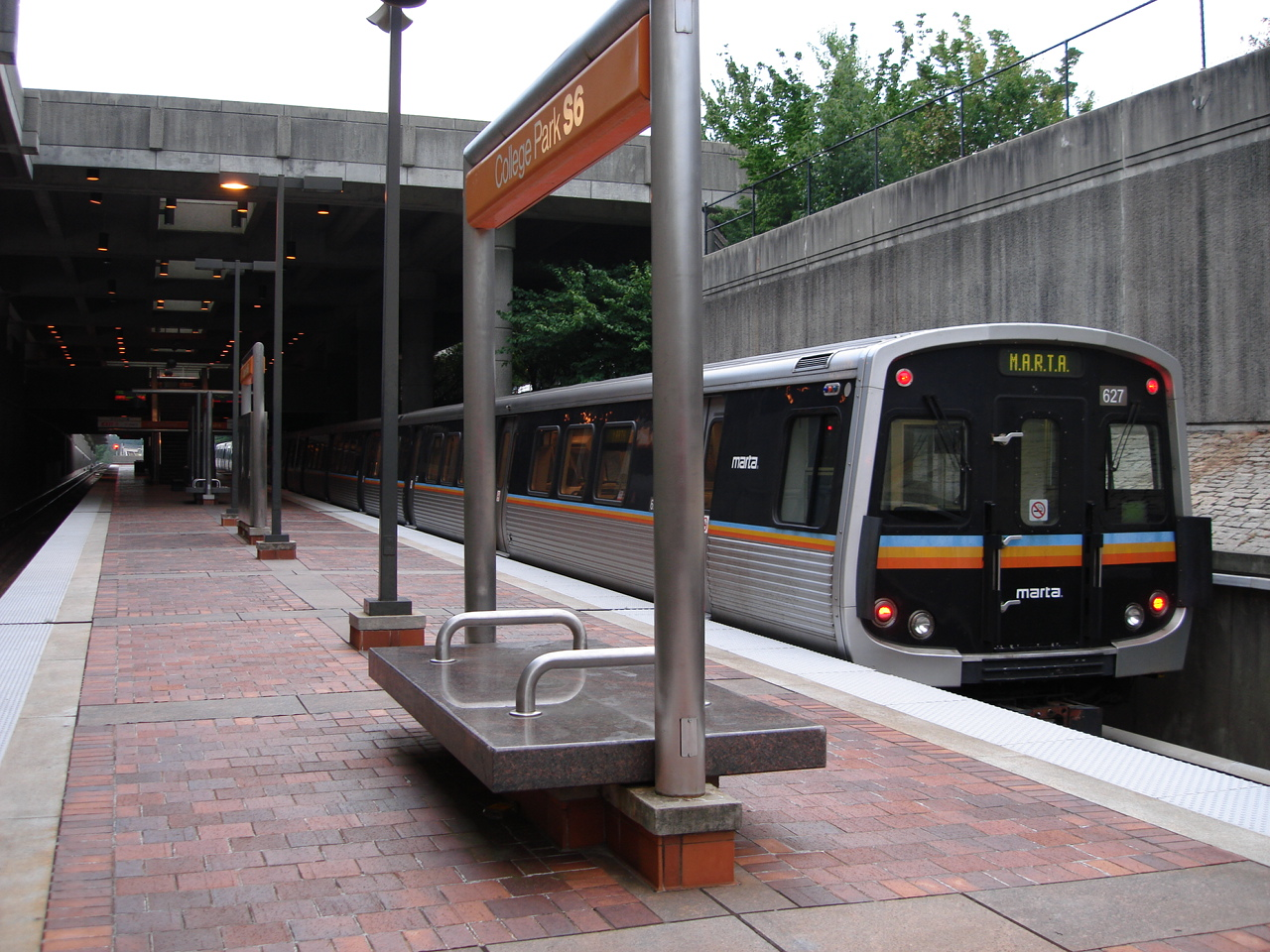
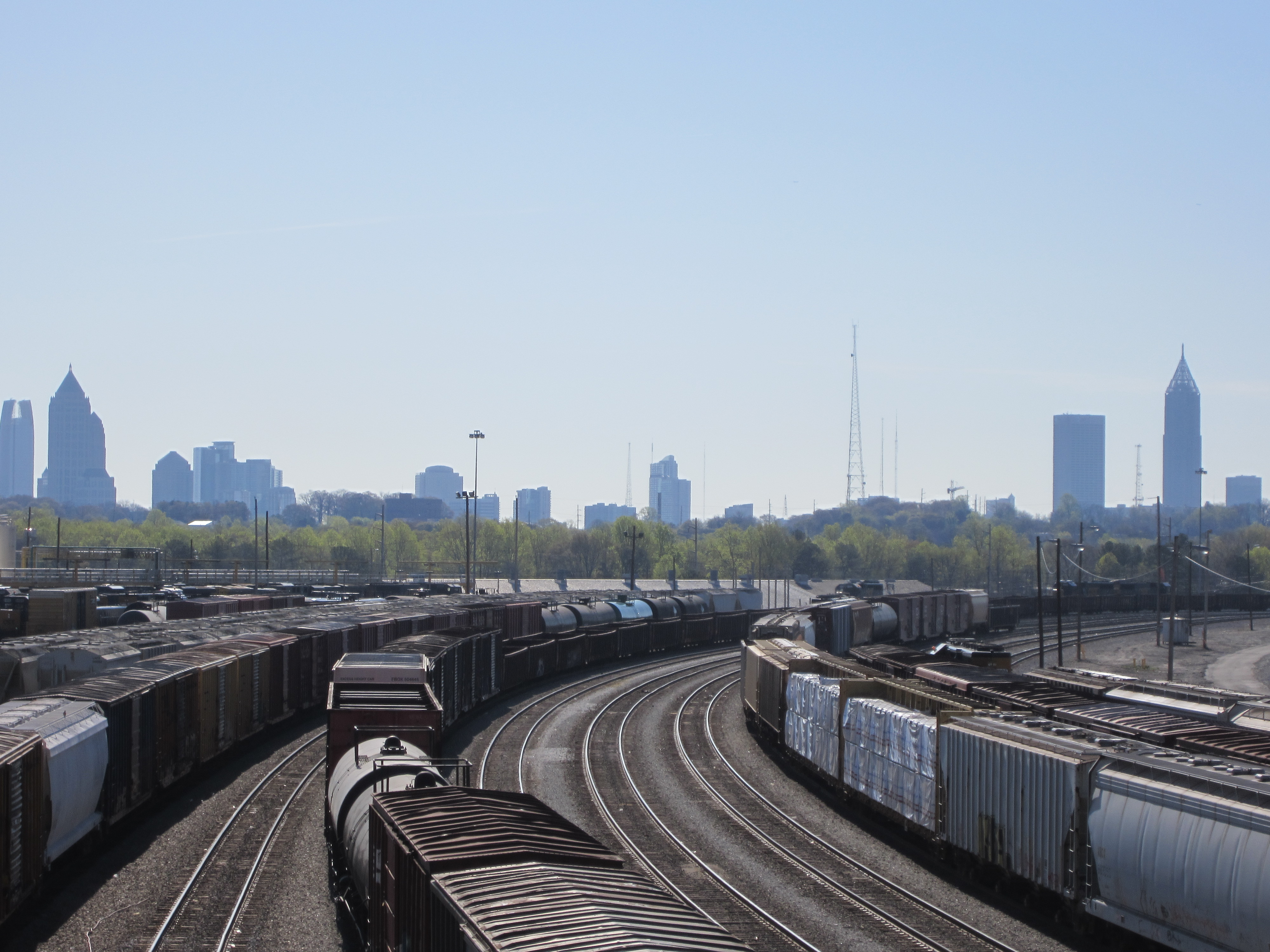
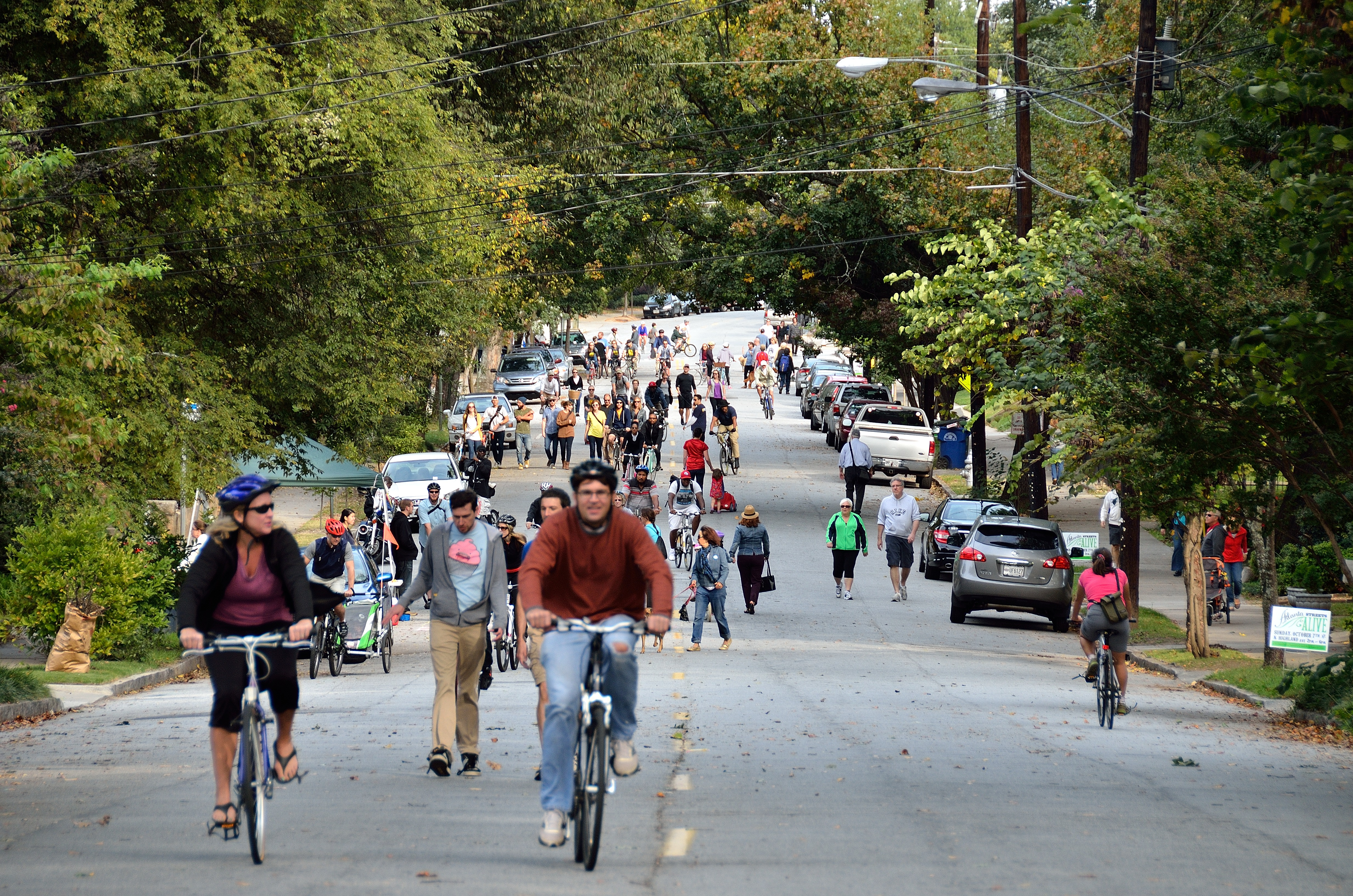
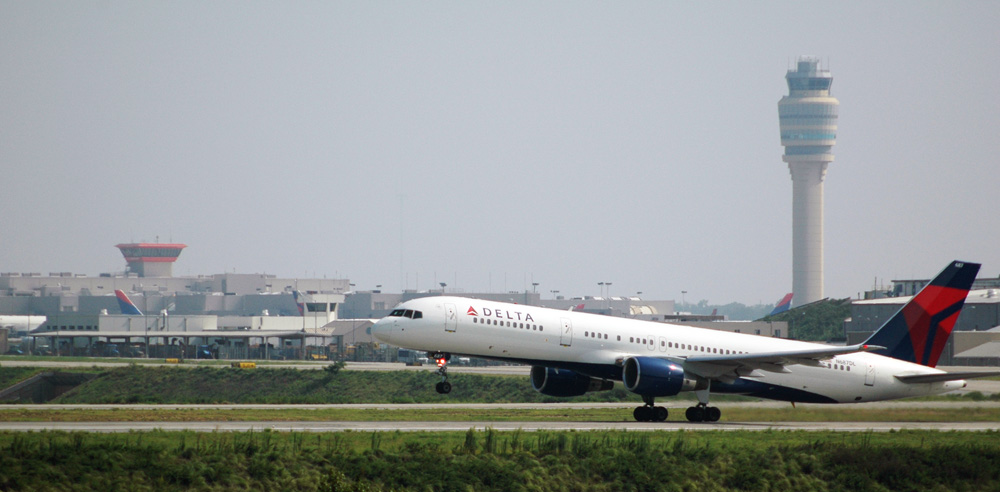
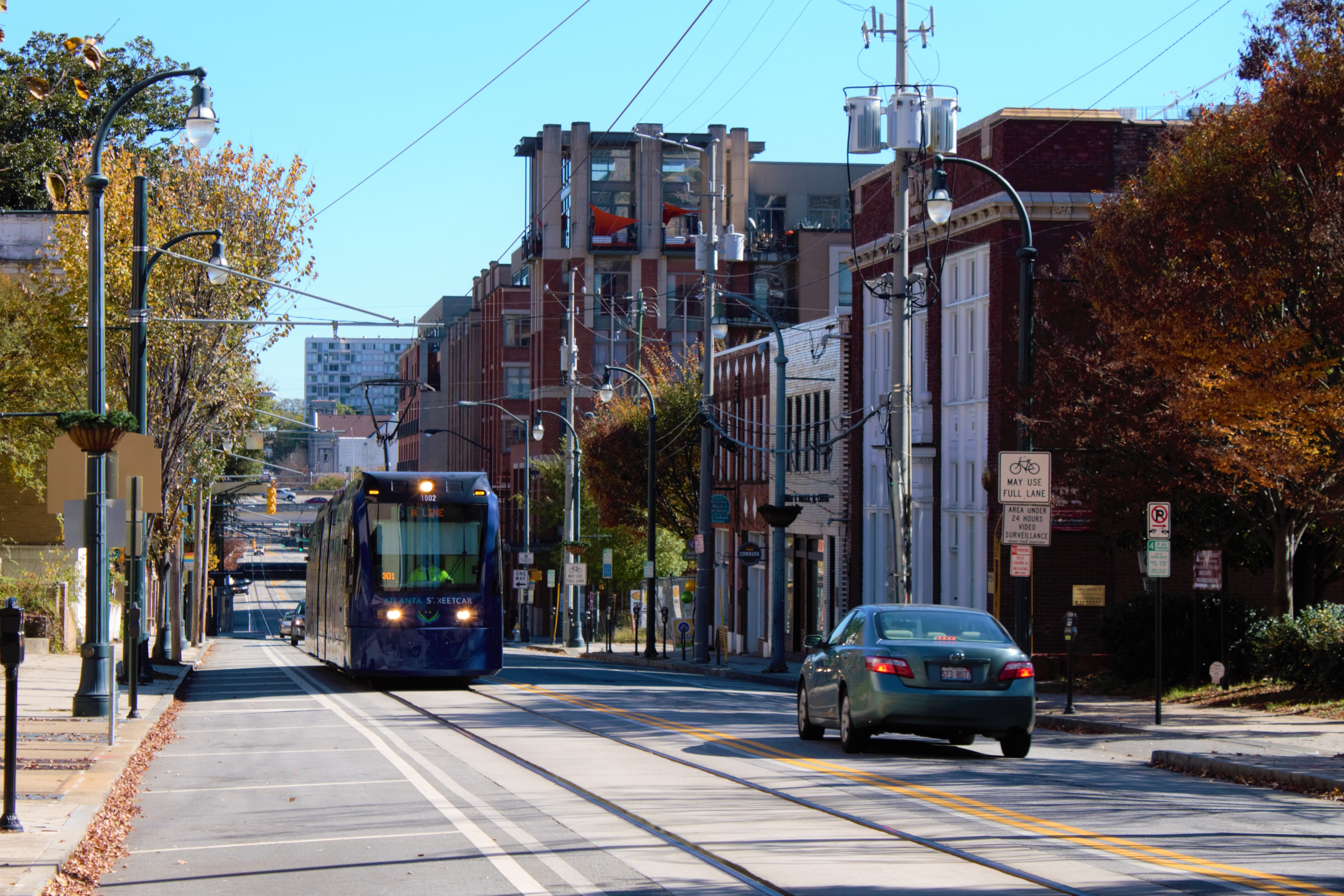
Transportation in Atlanta: The Downtown Connector, MARTA train at College Park station, Inman Yard, cyclists at Streets Alive, Hartsfield–Jackson Atlanta International Airport

Atlanta's transportation system is a complex multimodal system serving the city of Atlanta, Georgia, and widely recognized as a key regional and global hub for passenger and freight transportation. The system facilitates inter- and intra-city travel, and includes the world's busiest airport, several major freight rail classification yards, a comprehensive network of freeways, heavy rail, light rail, local buses, and multi-use trails.

Atlanta began as a railroad town, and transportation remains an important part of its economy. Several major transportation and logistics firms are headquartered in Atlanta, including Delta Air Lines, Norfolk Southern Railroad, and United Parcel Service.

Public transit, including the eighth-busiest rapid transit system in the United States, is operated primarily by the Metropolitan Atlanta Rapid Transit Authority (MARTA). The transit network also includes light rail and local bus routes. Despite these services, most Atlanta commuters choose to commute by car, with only 4.5% choosing to use transit in 2022. Emphasis on cars has resulted in heavy traffic and has led to significant pollution and congestion. Limited efforts are underway to reduce Atlanta's dependence on cars in order to improve system performance and reduce its impact on climate change, but several automobile capacity increases are also in the works.

== Background ==
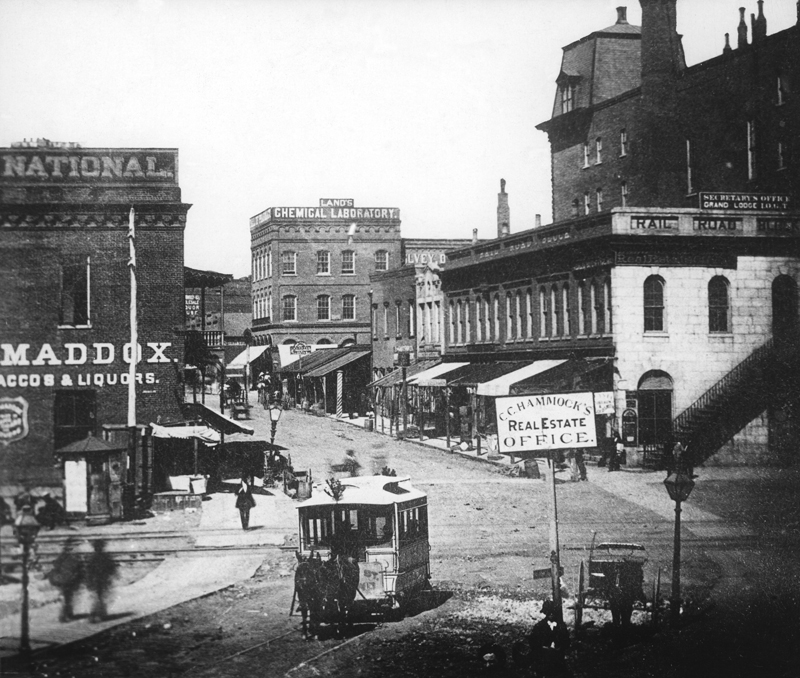
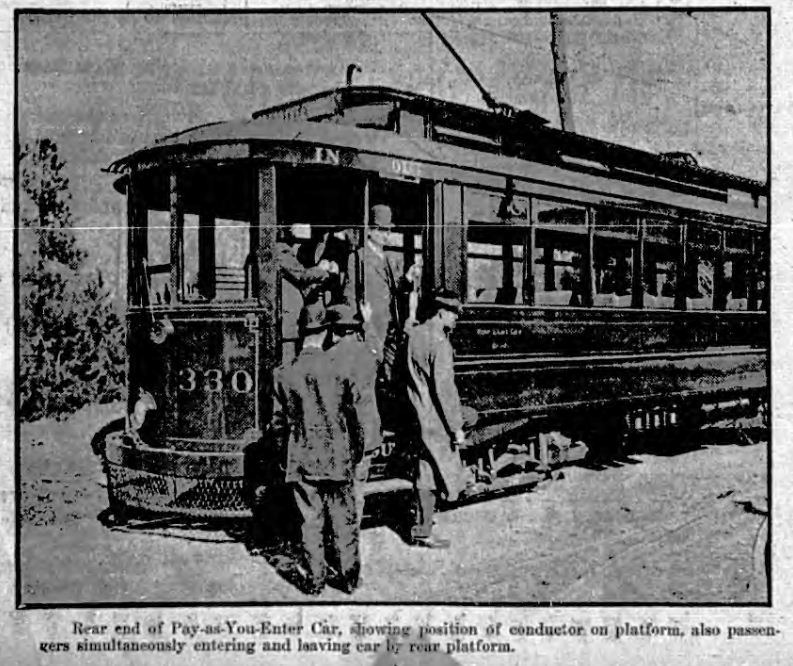
Top:A view of a horsecar on Peachtree Street in 1882.
Bottom: Atlanta streetcar, 1910. Pay-as-you-enter cars were being introduced at the time.

=== History ===
In 1836, the state of Georgia decided to build a railroad to the Midwest and chose as the terminus a location that is now Downtown Atlanta. Between 1845 and 1854, rail lines arrived from four different directions and Atlanta quickly became a commercial center and transportation hub for the south. In 1871, horsecars began operation in the city, and Electric Streetcars arrived in 1889. by 1926, passenger service peaked at 96,794,273 people per year. The introduction of trolleybuses in 1937 led to the gradual decline and eventual end of electric streetcar service in 1949. At its height, the trolleybus system carried 80% of all transit riders. By the end of 1949, Atlanta had 453 trolleybuses, the largest fleet in the United States, but Georgia Power had been losing money on the system since the 1920s. During the five-week-long transit strike of 1950 the company began looking for buyers. Four local businessmen formed the Atlanta Transit Company (ATC) and purchased the transportation properties on June 23, 1950.

In late 1962 ATC operated 273 trolleybuses on 39 routes, but they decided to phase them out to avoid the expense and difficulty of replacing the extensive fleet and stringing overhead wires in new service areas. The entire system was converted to diesel buses over a period of less than one month in September 1963. ATC continued operating bus services until it was bought by the newly-formed Metro Atlanta Rapid Transit Authority (MARTA) in 1971.

Meanwhile, national trends towards freeway expansion were taking hold in Atlanta. In the 1950s and 1960s, several new freeways, including I-20 and the Downtown Connector, were introduced. These freeways cut directly through many established communities, often intentionally targeting black neighborhoods like Sweet Auburn. Like other urban renewal projects, these decisions reinforced a pattern of displacement and disinvestment in minority communities, and further entrenched de facto segregation in Atlanta that can still be seen today.

State transportation planners continued to undertake frequent freeway expansion projects in the following decades. These included the completion of new interstates like the I-285 loop in 1969, I-575 in 1985, I-675 in 1987; the Freeing the Freeways interstate widening program, which doubled Atlanta's freeway lane miles between 1976 and 1988; and the introduction of HOV lanes in 1997. Additional in-town freeway routes were proposed in the early 1960s but cancelled after significant public backlash lasting over 30 years. While these projects were widely viewed at the time as necessary and impressive feats of engineering, modern transportation advocates feel that this overemphasis on car infrastructure has contributed to air and noise pollution, urban sprawl, and congestion.

In 2015, MARTA proposed extending the Red Line from its terminus at North Springs station five stops north towards Alpharetta. The project would have cost $8 billion. That year, MARTA also started studying creating a commuter rail line extending from East Point station to Clayton County. The line was in the works since the 1990s, but was delayed due to funding issues and negotiations with Norfolk Southern. However, the preferred alternative from the project was later changed to bus rapid transit in 2022.

=== Modern trends ===
Today, Atlanta commuters primarily choose to travel by car. 2022 census estimates show that, of workers commuting within the city, about 68% drove alone, 8% carpooled, and 5% used public transportation. Atlanta has a reputation for bad traffic and has been ranked among the worst cities for commuters. For this reason, some planners and activists have advocated for improved alternatives to driving. Organizations like Propel ATL are calling for better pedestrian and cycling infrastructure and improved transit performance. Projects like the BeltLine are intended to increase access to viable alternatives to driving. In April 2020, the Atlanta Department of Transportation (ATLDOT) committed to developing a Vision Zero action plan to reduce traffic fatalities.

== Mass transit ==
=== MARTA ===
Most public transport in Atlanta is operated by the Metropolitan Atlanta Rapid Transit Authority (MARTA). MARTA's system is composed of heavy rail, light rail, and local bus systems. MARTA operates primarily within the boundaries of Fulton, DeKalb, and Clayton counties.

Map of the MARTA rail system

MARTA's heavy rail system operates on 47.6 miles (76.6 km) of elevated, ground-level, and underground tracks. Trains serve 38 stations located on four service lines: the Red Line, Gold Line, Blue Line, and the Green Line. All four lines meet at the Five Points station, located in downtown Atlanta. MARTA trains are operated using the Automatic Train Control system, with one human train operator per train present to make announcements, operate the doors, and to operate the trains manually in case of a control system malfunction or an emergency. Many of the suburban stations have free daily and paid long-term park and ride lots, as well as kiss and ride passenger drop-off areas.

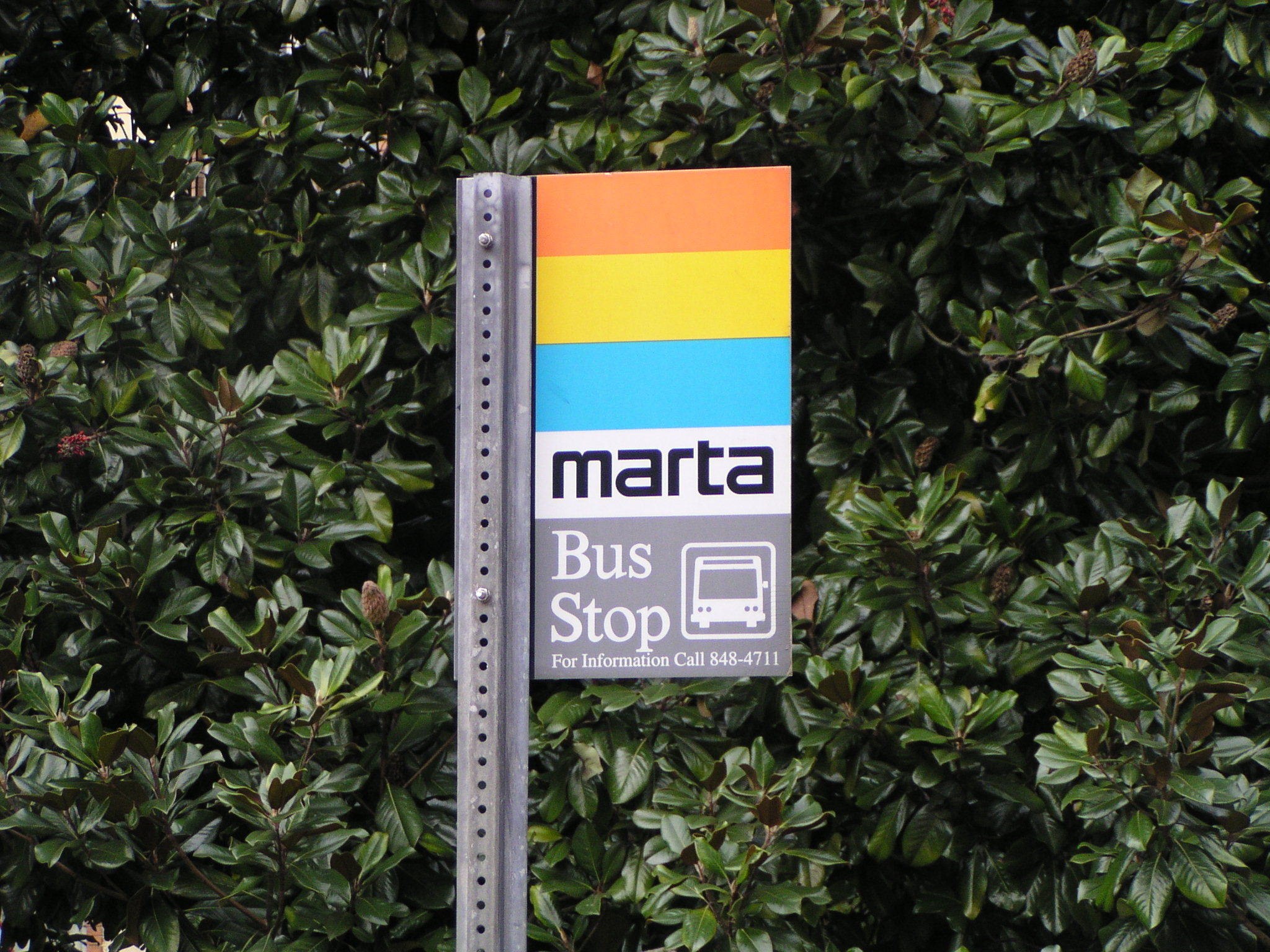
MARTA bus stop sign

MARTA's bus system serves a wider area than the rail system, including areas in North Fulton, South DeKalb, and Clayton County. As of 2017, MARTA has 550 diesel and compressed natural gas buses that cover over 101 bus routes. While Cobb County is not part of the system, MARTA operates two bus routes there, one serving Cumberland Boulevard Transfer Center, and the other serving Six Flags Over Georgia. All bus lines stop at at least one heavy rail station.

In addition to the free parking adjacent to many rail stations, MARTA also operates five park and ride lots serviced only by bus routes: Windward Parkway, Mansell Road, Goldsmith, Barge Road, South Fulton, and Riverdale. The Panola Road Park and Ride lot is jointly operated with GRTA.

In May 2016, MARTA completed its Comprehensive Operations Analysis, which outlined a series of changes to its service across the system, but primarily focused on changes to the bus network. The analysis proposed a series of frequency changes, realignments, and additional service levels. Starting in 2017, MARTA began implementing these changes. These changes will come both during MARTA's normal scheduled route modification dates, as well as on additional dates as part of the agency's "Fast Track" program.

The Atlanta Streetcar system opened at the end of 2014 and has been operated by MARTA since July 2018. The streetcar is a 2.7 mile loop that operates primarily in mixed traffic in the downtown area. It runs from Centennial Olympic Park along Edgewood and Auburn avenues to the King Center and has a stop at MARTA's Peachtree Center station.

=== Other transit ===
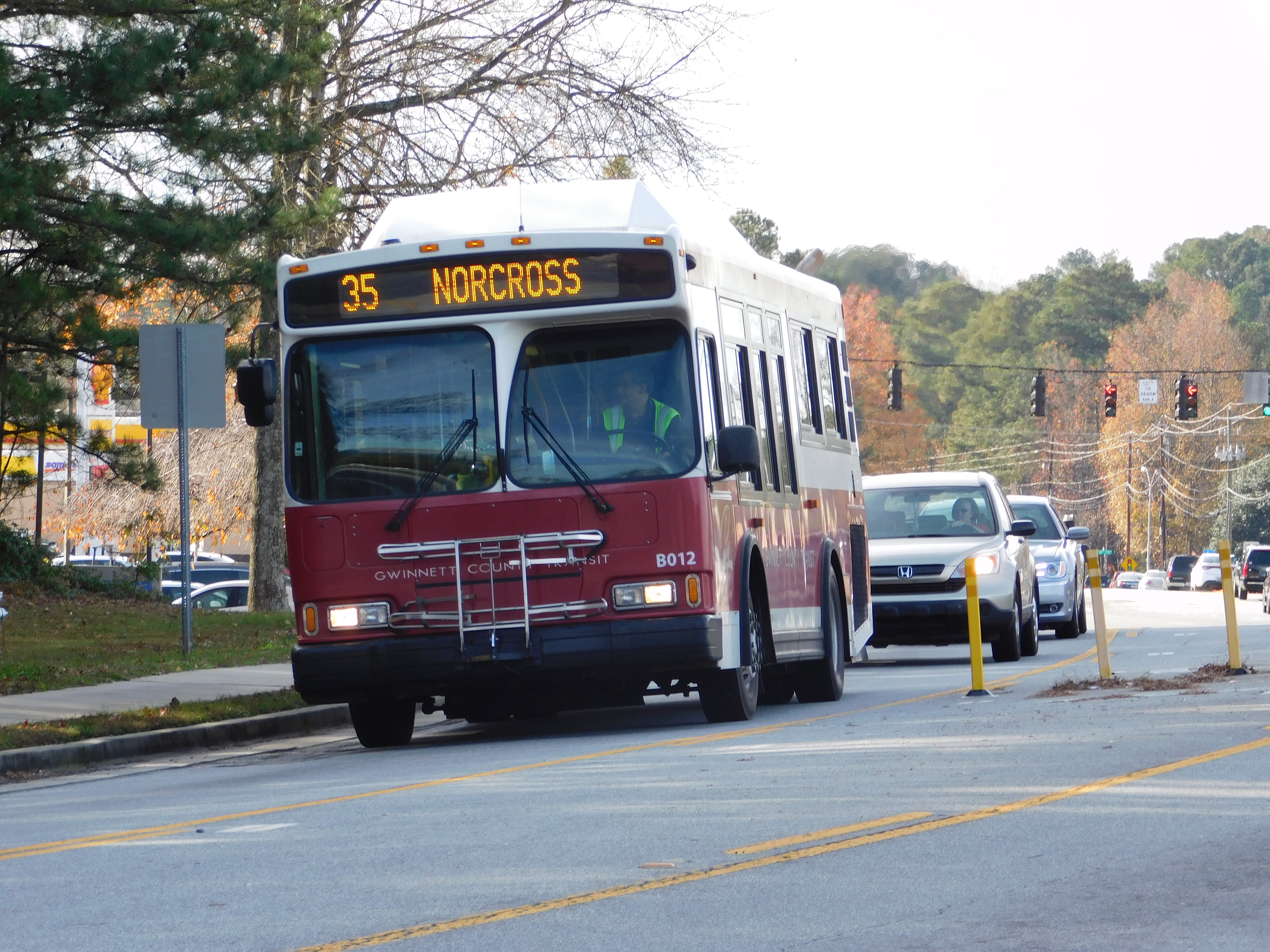
A Gwinnett County Transit Orion VII bus operating route 35 on South Old Peachtree Road.

Several other localities in the metro area operate local bus services. Of these, CobbLinc and Ride Gwinnett used to also offer commuter bus service connecting their local services with Atlanta. On June 16, 2025, those commuter services were incorporated into Xpress, along with a series of service cuts to due budget constraints and low ridership. The Georgia Transportation Efficiency Authority, a state-level entity, oversees the Xpress bus system. Xpress operates 15 regional commuter bus routes connecting outlying cities and towns to Downtown and Midtown Atlanta. Emory University operates The Cliff shuttle bus system with over 50 buses, 21 routes, and 200,000 rides per month. The Georgia Institute of Technology operates the Stinger shuttles, providing service around its campus, the Midtown MARTA station, and neighboring communities.

=== Intercity bus and rail ===
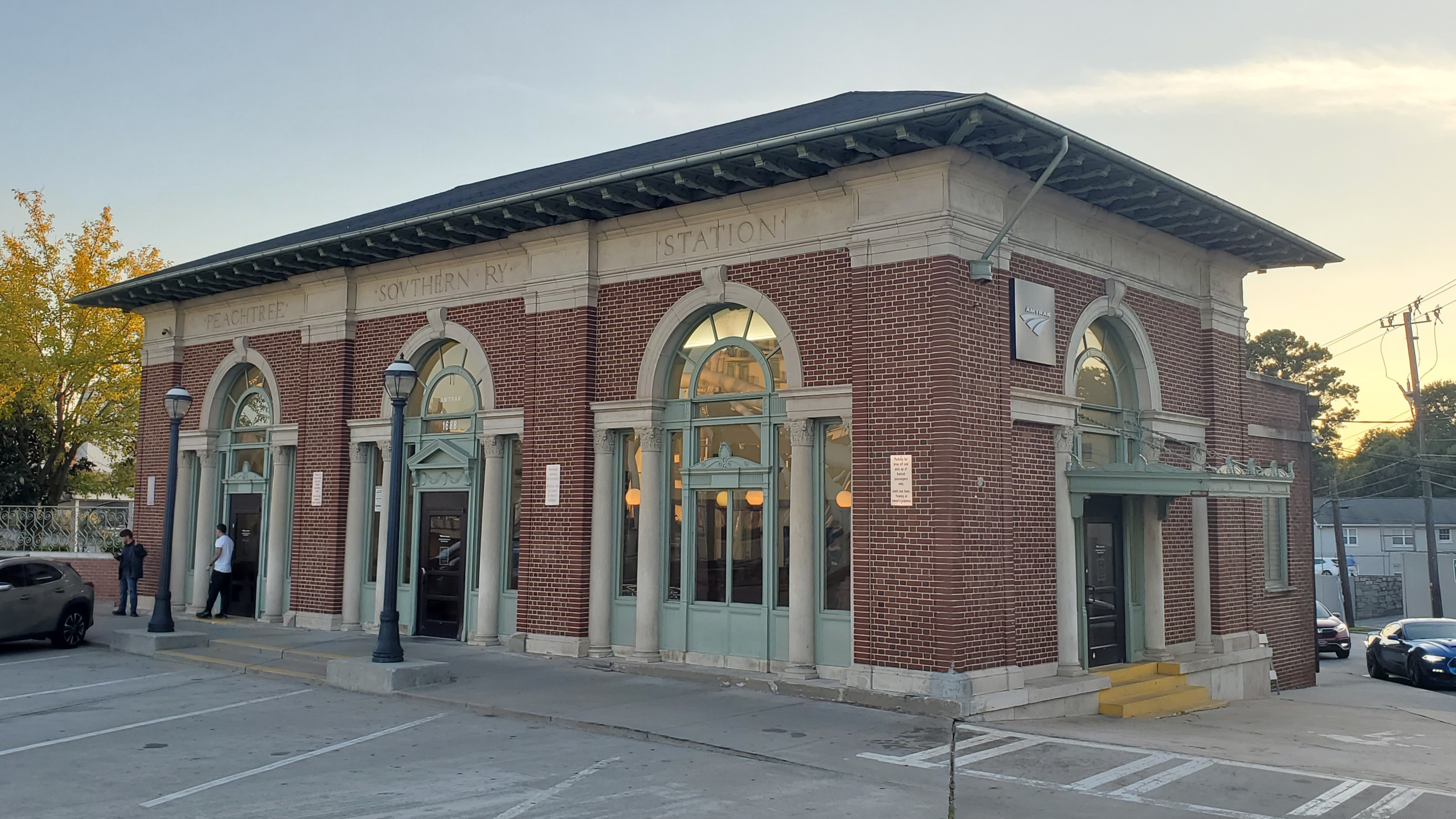
The Atlanta Peachtree Station

Intercity bus services are operated by Megabus and Greyhound Lines, departing from outside the Garnett MARTA station downtown.

At the Atlanta Peachtree station, Amtrak offers daily intercity train service on its Crescent route between New Orleans and New York City.

== Roads and freeways ==
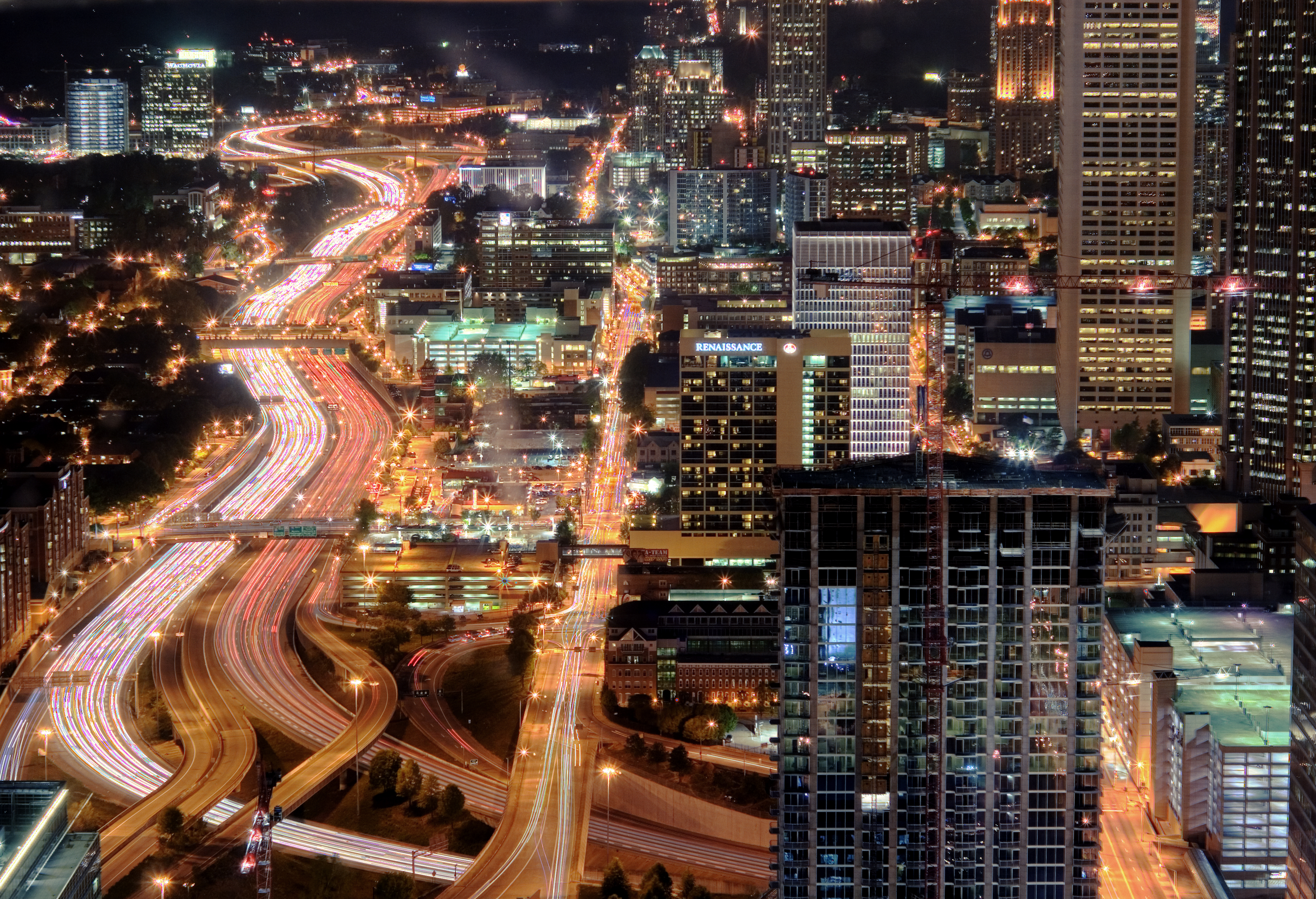
The Downtown Connector, seen at night in Midtown.

Most Atlantans rely on cars as their primary mode of transportation within the city. As of 2022, as little as 4.5% of commuters chose to use transit to get to work, and 85% of households had access to at least one car. Atlanta is well known for its traffic; in 2023 it was found to have 3 of the top 15 biggest trucking bottlenecks in the country (a fourth was located in nearby McDonough), and to be one of the worst for car commuters.

Atlanta is served by three self-driving car companies: Waymo (in full service with Uber), May Mobility, and Zoox.

=== Major highways ===
Three major Interstate highways converge in Atlanta: I-20 (east–west), I-75 (northwest–southeast), and I-85 (northeast–southwest). Parts of I-75 and I-85 run concurrently for 7.4 miles through the center of downtown and midtown to form the Downtown Connector. This thoroughfare carries as many as 400,000 cars per day. Atlanta is mostly encircled by Interstate 285, a beltway locally known as the Perimeter, which is commonly used to informally mark the boundary between the city and close-in suburbs ("inside the Perimeter" or "ITP") and the outer suburbs and exurbs: ("outside The Perimeter" or "OTP"). Georgia State Route 400 diverges from I-85 near Buckhead and travels north, crossing I-285 just north of city limits. The outer metro also has three other auxiliary Interstates: I-575, 675, and I-985. Interstates and state highways are administered and maintained by the Georgia Department of Transportation (GDOT).

=== Toll lanes ===
Peach Pass toll lanes have been introduced as part of the GDOT's Major Mobility Improvement Program (MMIP). The first lanes, opened in 2011 on I-85 in Gwinnett County, were converted from existing HOV (High Occupancy Vehicle) lanes to HOT (High Occupancy Toll) lanes. The second, on I-75 in Henry and Clayton Counties, opened in 2017 as the first fully barrier-separated section. The third, known as the Northwest Corridor, opened in September 2018 on I-75 and I-575 in Cobb and Cherokee Counties. Both of the I-75 facilities are reversible, meaning that the lanes flow towards downtown Atlanta in the morning, and toward the suburbs in the afternoon.

=== Pedestrians and cycling ===
Cycling is a growing mode of transportation in Atlanta, taking 1.1% of all commutes in 2009, up from 0.3% in 2000, and organizations like Propel ATL continue to lobby for increased accessibility to bicyclists. However, heavy automobile traffic, Atlanta's famed hills, the lack of bike lanes on many streets, and difficulty in crossing major streets deter many residents from cycling frequently in Atlanta. The city's transportation plan calls for the construction of 226 miles (364 km) of bike lanes by 2020. The BeltLine which will include multi-use, paved trails, may help the city achieve this goal.

Additional multi-use trails currently being developed throughout Atlanta include the PATH400 and the Peachtree Creek Greenway.

Starting in June 2016, Atlanta received a bike sharing program, known as Relay Bike Share, with 100 bikes in Downtown and Midtown, which expanded to 500 bikes at 65 stations as of April 2017.

== Air transportation ==
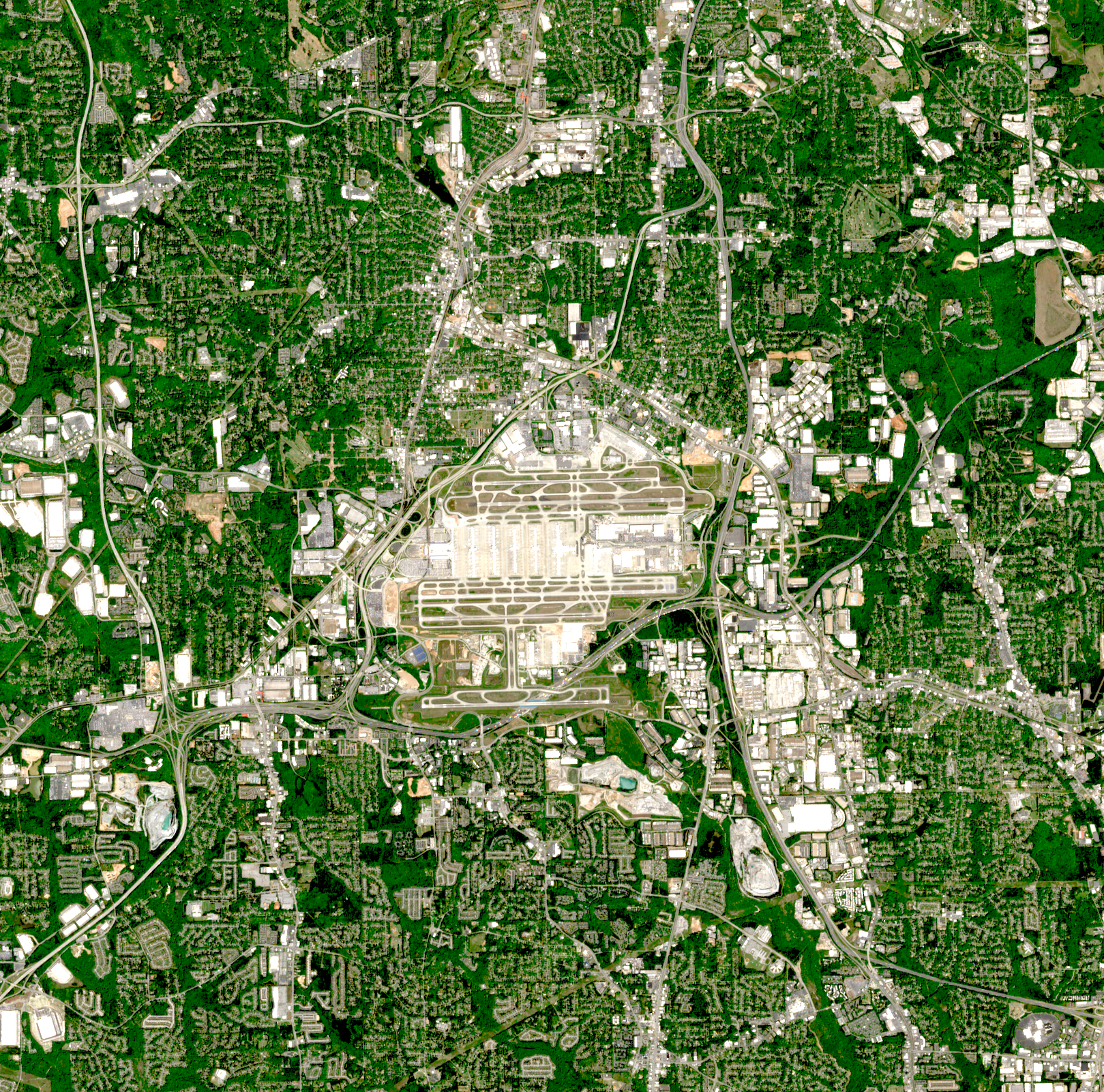
The Hartsfield-Jackson Atlanta International Airport on April 19, 2022, taken from the Sentinel-2A satellite.

Situated 10 miles (16 km) south of downtown, Hartsfield-Jackson Atlanta International Airport (IATA: ATL, ICAO: KATL) is the world's busiest airport. Hartsfield-Jackson offers air service to over 150 U.S. destinations and more than 70 international destinations in 43 countries, with over 2,100 arrivals and departures daily. Delta Air Lines is headquartered nearby, and maintains its largest hub at Hartsfield-Jackson. The domestic terminal has its own MARTA rail station, and both terminals are easily accessible from Interstate 75, Interstate 85, and Interstate 285.

Hartsfield-Jackson is the only airport in metro Atlanta with significant scheduled commercial air service. Other airports near Atlanta include Fulton County Airport (IATA: FTY, ICAO: KFTY) and DeKalb-Peachtree Airport (IATA: PDK, ICAO: KPDK), which primarily handle general aviation.

== Current and proposed projects ==
=== Beltline ===
In July 2012, there was a referendum on a 1-cent sales tax (SPLOST) to fund traffic and road improvements. The tax would have funded several streetcar routes along portions of the Beltline trail and connections onto MARTA stations and with the Downtown Loop streetcar. However, the vote failed by a wide margin. Beltline light rail planning subsequently continued under the More MARTA program, though as of 2026 no construction has begun and the routing and funding remain unresolved.

=== Clifton Corridor ===
The Clifton Corridor is a proposed public transit corridor roughly connecting the Buckhead, Emory University, and Decatur areas, with a terminus at the Avondale MARTA station. MARTA selected light rail as the preferred mode in 2012, but eliminated that option in February 2023 in favor of bus rapid transit.

== See also ==
- Plug-in electric vehicles in Georgia (U.S. state) § Atlanta
