= Northern Arc =

Northern Arc may refer to:

- Northern Arc (trade route)
- Outer Perimeter, a previously planned expressway in Atlanta
