= Edwin Olson =

American computer scientist

Edwin Brock Olson
- Born: 3 June 1977 (age 49); Hennepin County, Minnesota, US
- Education: Massachusetts Institute of Technology (MEng,PhD)
- Known for: Vehicular automation; Robotics
- Scientific career
- Fields: Robotics
- Thesis: Robust and Efficient Robotic Mapping (2008)
- Doctoral advisor: John J. Leonard Seth Teller

Edwin Olson (born 3 June 1977) is an American academic, roboticist, and business executive. He is the co-founder and chief executive officer (CEO) of May Mobility, an Ann Arbor-based developer of autonomous vehicle technology, and an adjunct professor of computer science and engineering at the University of Michigan. Previously, he served as a full professor of electrical engineering and computer science at the University of Michigan and as a co-director of Autonomous Driving, Toyota Research Institute.

== Early life and education ==
Olson was born in 1977 and grew up in nearby Bloomington, Minnesota. He was educated at JF Kennedy High School in Bloomington.

Olson received a Bachelor of Science in electrical engineering and computer science in 2000, followed by a Master of Engineering in the same field in 2001. His master's thesis, titled Otto: A Low-Cost Robotics Platform for Research and Education. In 2008, he completed his Ph.D. in computer science and engineering at the MIT Computer Science and Artificial Intelligence Laboratory (CSAIL). His doctoral dissertation, Robust and Efficient Robotic Mapping, was supervised by John J. Leonard and Seth Teller. While at MIT, he was a member of the team that competed in the 2007 DARPA Urban Challenge, where their autonomous vehicle secured a fourth-place finish.

== Career ==
In 2008, Olson became an assistant professor of computer science and engineering at the University of Michigan, where he founded the APRIL Robotics Laboratory. In 2010, his "Team Michigan" won the inaugural Multi Autonomous Ground-robotic International Challenge (MAGIC) in Australia. The team used a fleet of 14 coordinated robots to map an urban area, securing a $750,000 prize from the United States Department of Defense. Olson was promoted to associate professor with tenure in 2014 and to full professor in 2020.

While at the university, Olson worked with Ford Motor Company on autonomous vehicle research. In 2016, he also assumed the role of co-director of autonomous driving development at the newly established Toyota Research Institute (TRI) in Ann Arbor, while retaining a part-time faculty position.

In early 2017, Olson left TRI to co-found May Mobility, an Ann Arbor-based company that develops and operates autonomous shuttle services for short-distance transit. As CEO, Olson oversaw the company's first deployment in Detroit in 2018. May Mobility has since launched its low-speed, electric shuttles in other U.S. locations, including Arlington, Texas, and Grand Rapids, Minnesota, as well as a pilot program in Hiroshima, Japan, in 2021.

Olson continues to lead May Mobility as CEO while maintaining his affiliation with the University of Michigan.

== Research ==
Olson's research focuses on enabling robots and autonomous vehicles to perceive and navigate complex environments, frequently involving multi-robot cooperation. At the University of Michigan, he developed AprilTag, a two-dimensional barcode-based fiducial marker system for visual localization and mapping.

Olson has also contributed to autonomous driving software. He co-developed the Multi-Policy Decision Making (MPDM) framework, which enables autonomous vehicles to simulate and evaluate numerous possible trajectories in real-time, facilitating adaptive driving behaviors in dynamic environments.

== Selected publications ==
- Olson, E. (2011). "AprilTag: A robust and flexible visual fiducial system". 2011 IEEE International Conference on Robotics and Automation. pp. 3400–3407. doi:10.1109/ICRA.2011.5979561. ISBN 978-1-61284-386-5.
- Wang, J.; Olson, E. (2016). "AprilTag 2: Efficient and robust fiducial detection". 2016 IEEE/RSJ International Conference on Intelligent Robots and Systems (IROS). pp. 4193–4198. doi:10.1109/IROS.2016.7759617. ISBN 978-1-5090-3762-9.
- Olson, Edwin; Leonard, John; Teller, Seth Teller (2006). "Fast iterative alignment of pose graphs with poor initial estimates". Proceedings 2006 IEEE International Conference on Robotics and Automation, 2006. ICRA 2006. pp. 2262–2269. doi:10.1109/ROBOT.2006.1642040. ISBN 0-7803-9505-0. - selected as a Google Scholar "classic paper" in the robotics field
- Leonard, J.; How, J.; Teller, S.; Berger, M.; Campbell, S.; Fiore, G.; Fletcher, L. (2008). "A perception-driven autonomous urban vehicle". Journal of Field Robotics. 25 (10): 727–774. doi:10.1002/rob.20262.
- Olson, E. B. (2009). "Real-time correlative scan matching". 2009 IEEE International Conference on Robotics and Automation. pp. 4387–4393. doi:10.1109/ROBOT.2009.5152375. ISBN 978-1-4244-2788-8.

== Awards and recognition ==
During his tenure at the University of Michigan, he was named to Popular Science magazine's "Brilliant 10" list of young scientists in 2012. In the same year, a paper by his team on robotic mapping earned a Best Paper award at the International Conference on Intelligent Robots and Systems (IROS). In 2013, he received a Young Faculty Award from the Defense Advanced Research Projects Agency (DARPA). In 2014, Olson received the Morris Wellman Faculty Development Professorship.
