= Atlanta-Region Transit Link Authority =

Former transit authority in the U.S. state of Georgia

Agency overview
- Formed: May 3, 2018
- Dissolved: May 12, 2026
- Superseding agency: Georgia Transportation Efficiency Authority
- Jurisdiction: Georgia, U.S.
- Website: atltransit.ga.gov

The Atlanta-Region Transit Link Authority (ATL) was a state agency in Georgia that planned and coordinated regional transit across the 13-county Atlanta metropolitan area.

The ATL was established by HB 930, signed into law by Governor Nathan Deal on May 3, 2018. The legislation charged the ATL with developing short-range and long-range regional transit plans for a 13-county area — Cherokee, Clayton, Coweta, Cobb, DeKalb, Douglas, Fayette, Forsyth, Fulton, Gwinnett, Henry, Paulding, and Rockdale — and coordinating transit services operating within them. No transit expansion could be mandated at the regional level; counties were required to opt in to any specific project or funding mechanism. MARTA continued to operate the region's heavy rail system.

The legislation created new transit funding mechanisms: communities could seek voter approval for a local sales tax of up to 1 percent for up to 30 years to fund transit construction and operations. The state's FY2019 budget included $100 million in bonds for transit tied to the legislation's passage.

The ATL was dissolved on May 12, 2026, when Governor Brian Kemp signed HB 297, consolidating the ATL and the Georgia Regional Transportation Authority into the Georgia Transportation Efficiency Authority (GTEA).

== Governance ==
A 16-member board governed the ATL, comprising ten citizen representatives drawn from specially created transit districts within the 13-county region, two appointees of the Speaker of the House, two appointees of the Lieutenant Governor, a chairperson appointed by the Governor, and the Georgia DOT commissioner as a non-voting member.

== See also ==
- Georgia Regional Transportation Authority
- Georgia Transportation Efficiency Authority
- GRTA Xpress
- Metro Atlanta Rapid Transit Authority
