= May Mobility =

American technology company

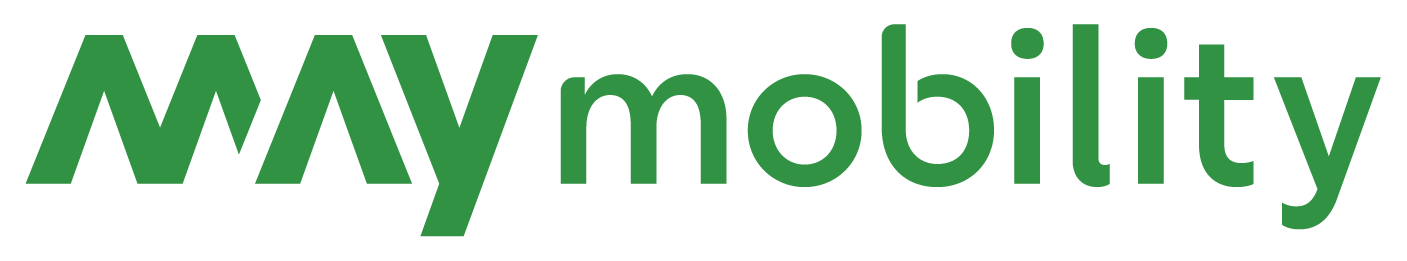

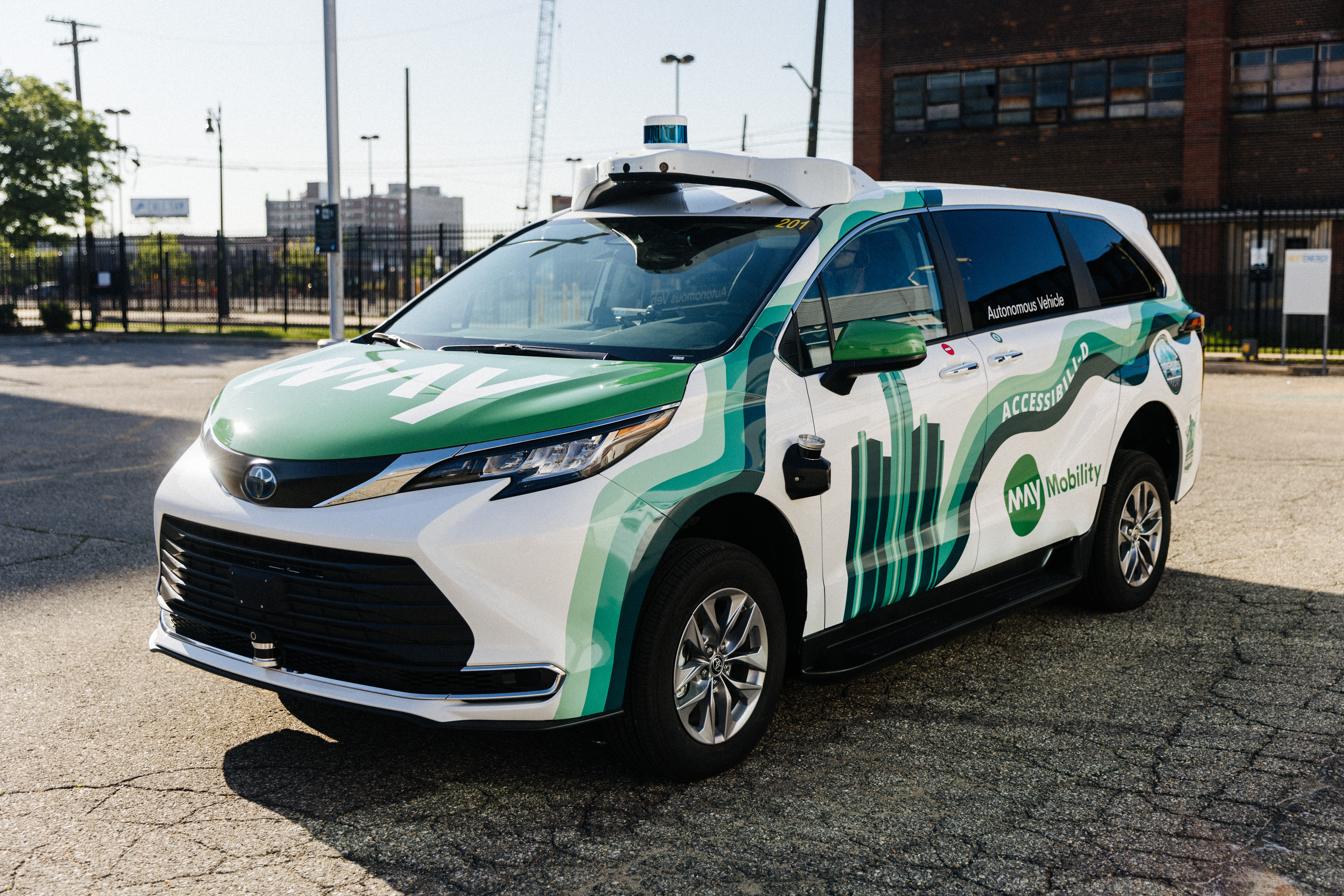
- May Mobility Toyota Sienna in Detroit
- Type: Private
- Industry: Autonomous vehicles
- Founded: 2017
- Founders: Edwin Olson; Alisyn Malek; Steve Vozar
- Headquarters: Ann Arbor, Michigan, U.S.
- Area served: United States; Japan
- Key people: Edwin Olson (CEO)
- Products: Autonomous vehicles, MPDM software
- Services: On-demand autonomous transportation
- Website: maymobility.com

May Mobility, Inc is an American technology company that develops and operates autonomous vehicle and robotaxi services. It is based in Ann Arbor, Michigan.

== History ==
May Mobility was co-founded by Edwin Olson, Alisyn Malek, and Steve Vozar. It was part of the Y Combinator startup accelerator in 2017.

In June 2018, May Mobility launched its first service in Detroit, using electric shuttles to transport employees for Bedrock and Quicken Loans. Later that year, it began operating an autonomous shuttle in Columbus, Ohio, as part of the Smart Columbus initiative, which provided approximately 16,000 rides before concluding in 2019. In December 2018, May Mobility raised a $11.5 million seed extension from investors including BMW iVentures and Toyota AI Ventures.

In mid-2019, May Mobility launched a service in Providence, Rhode Island, and also began operations in Grand Rapids, Michigan. In Grand Rapids, the service was upgraded in 2021 to an on-demand transit system using Lexus RX 450h hybrid SUVs and Via's ride-request application. This pilot provided over 70,000 rides and ended in April 2022.

In 2021, May Mobility launched "Arlington RAPID" in Arlington, Texas, integrating its vehicles into the city's public transit network. The service provided over 28,000 trips in its first year. The company also operated pilots in Indianapolis and Fishers, Indiana, during 2021–22. In 2021, May Mobility also began international operations in Japan through a partnership with SoftBank, deploying vehicles on the campus of Hiroshima University.

In July 2022, May Mobility raised $111 million in a Series C funding round led by Mirai Creation Fund, bringing its total funding to $194 million.

In November 2023, NTT made an investment of 10 billion yen in May Mobility. In December 2023, May Mobility launched a rider-only service with no onboard attendants in Sun City, Arizona, using autonomous Toyota Sienna minivans.

In February 2025, it launched a driverless public AV service in Peachtree Corners, Georgia. In May 2025, it was announced that May Mobility will launch robotaxis on the Uber platform in Arlington, Texas. In September 2025, May Mobility, in a joint initiative with Lyft, launched its first robotaxis in Atlanta.

In October 2025, May Mobility expanded its operations to Southeast Asia after receiving an investment from Grab. This expansion is set for 2026, if regulations allow, and will leverage on GrabMaps to ensure safe deployment on Southeast Asian roads.

== Operations ==
May Mobility operates on a business-to-government and business-to-business model, partnering with cities and private organizations to run autonomous vehicle and robotaxi services. The company provides vehicles, technology, and fleet management. Riders typically request rides through a smartphone application such as Lyft or Uber.

Past deployments include the "A2GO" service in Ann Arbor, Michigan, which launched in October 2021, and the "RAPID" program in Arlington, Texas. During the COVID-19 pandemic in 2020, it used its AVs to deliver food pantry boxes in Columbus, Ohio. In Japan, May Mobility has tested its vehicles on public roads in Tokyo and on the grounds of a Toyota manufacturing plant in Fukuoka. While some pilots have concluded, the deployment in Grand Rapids, Minnesota, has been extended with additional funding.

== Technology ==
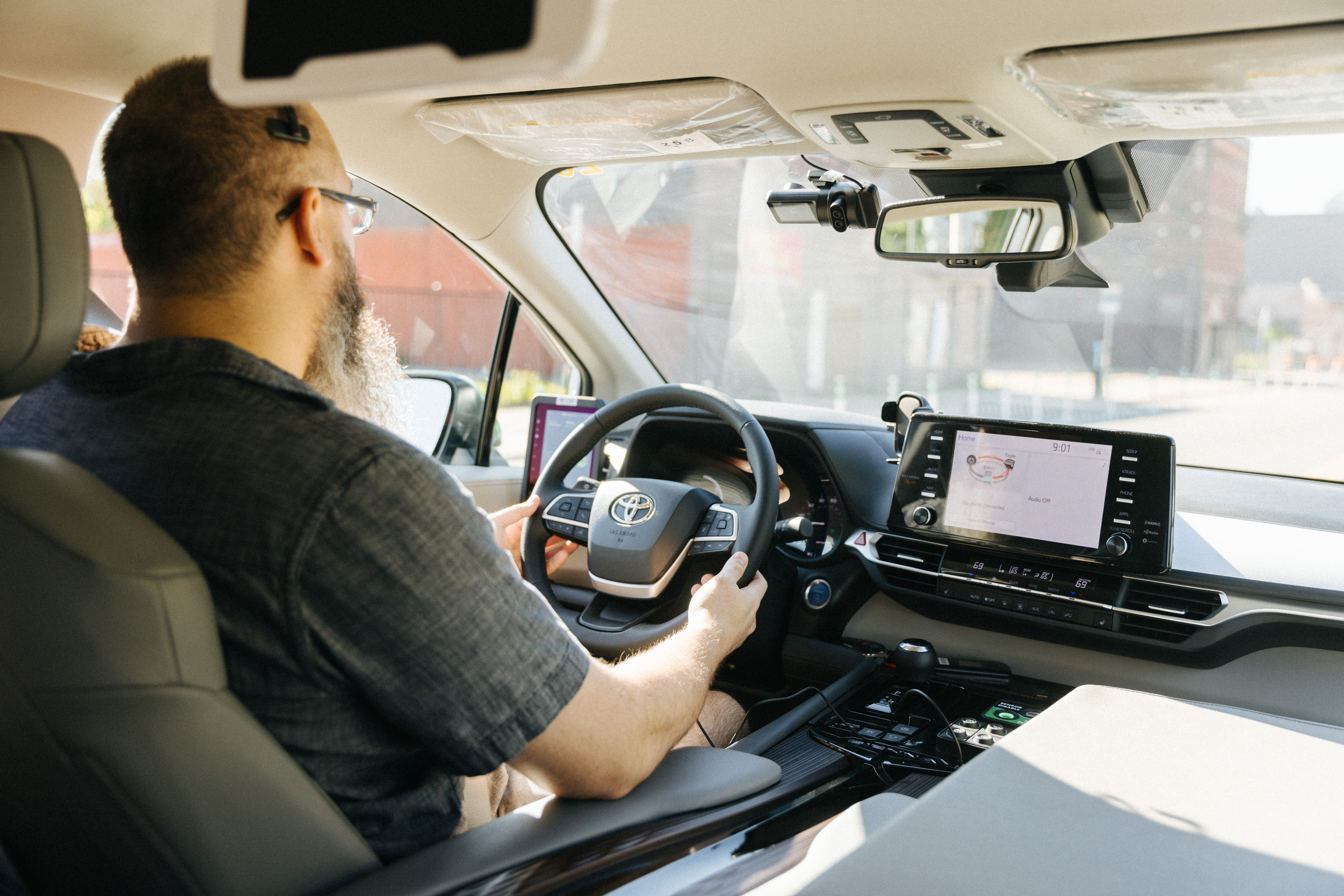
Interior of a May Mobility vehicle with a safety driver

May Mobility's autonomous driving system is based on its Multi-Policy Decision Making (MPDM) framework. The software simulates thousands of potential scenarios in real time to predict the behavior of surrounding vehicles and pedestrians, then selects a maneuver based on the projections.

May Mobility's vehicles are equipped with LiDAR sensors, radars, and cameras to provide a 360-degree view. May Mobility retrofits existing commercial vehicles with its self-driving technology. Early services used Polaris GEM electric carts and then Lexus RX 450h SUVs. Current deployments all use the Toyota Sienna Autono-MaaS platform. It has also integrated its system with Toyota's e-Palette, a battery-electric mobility-as-a-service vehicle platform, in Japan.

In November 2026 the company announced that it planned to deploy 10,000 Volkwagen ID.Buzz vans globally through 2031.
