= Outer Perimeter =

Highway in Georgia

State Route 500
- Outer Perimeter Highway; Northern Arc

Route information
- Maintained by GDOT
- Length: 55 mi (89 km)
- History: proposed

Major junctions
- West end: I-75 near Cartersville
- I-575 / SR 5 near Canton; US 19 / SR 400 near Cumming; I-985 / US 23 / SR 365 in Buford
- East end: I-85 / SR 20 in Buford

Location
- Country: United States
- State: Georgia

Highway system
- Georgia State Highway System; Interstate; US; State; Special
← US 441	→ SR 515

The Outer Perimeter is a freeway originally planned to encircle Atlanta, in the U.S. state of Georgia about 20 to 25 miles (32 to 40 km) outside of Interstate 285.

The highway has been officially designated Georgia State Route 500. Advocates of the highway touted its use by long-distance truck drivers to have them completely avoid the congestion of the highways much closer to Atlanta.

The original Perimeter, Interstate 285, which was originally planned as a bypass of the city and was completed in 1969, has in effect become one of the main freeway routes for both local traffic and traffic passing through the Atlanta area.

== History ==
The original plan of the highway was to have roughly gone through or near the communities of Cartersville, Canton, Cumming, Buford, Dacula, Loganville, Conyers, McDonough, Hampton, Newnan, Peachtree City, Villa Rica, and Dallas. The roadway was to have roughly paralleled State Route 20, which goes around three sides of Atlanta.

A later incarnation of the highway only encompassed what was termed the Northern Arc and included the portion of the original planned highway from Interstate 75 near Cartersville across to Interstate 85 near the Mall of Georgia in Buford. One proposal tied to this version would have reportedly limited exits to five major interchanges, at the freeways that crossed it: I-75; I-575; US 19/Georgia State Route 400; Interstate 985; and I-85.

The Northern Arc was to have been a toll road under another proposal, which advocates say would have kept most local traffic away from the highway, while freeing it for trucks. Opponents said that despite the toll, the road would have encouraged additional development and congestion, leading the more urban sprawl in the region. Then-governor Roy Barnes effectively killed the project in 2002. However, the Northern Arc resurfaced in February 2007, with suggestions that it be placed further north, out of the current path of exurban land development.

=== Update ===
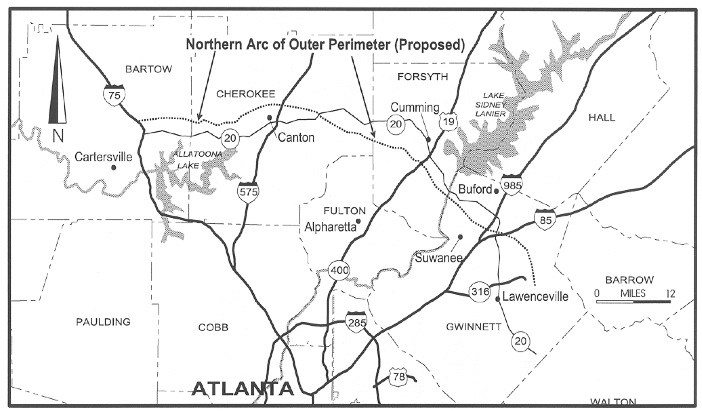
A map showing the resemblance between the originally-proposed Northern Arc and SR 20 Credit: Truman Hartshorn study, GSU

In 2015, SR 20 started to get widened, starting with a new bridge over the Chattahoochee River, to alleviate traffic congestion. The route will closely resemble the original Northern Arc path and the plan will essentially be the Northern Arc replacement. Quietly in October 2017, the northeastern-most side of the Northern Arc was finally scheduled to be in place. However as of 2021 there have been no updates and the date of construction remains unknown.

Planned to be a toll road from I-85 to SR 316, labeled as the Sugarloaf Parkway Extension, Phase II, one can clearly see the routing. It follows, at least in Gwinnett County, the start of a portion of the outer Atlanta freeway loop. Reading through the information, where the last phase ends at Peachtree Industrial Boulevard, it shows a partial (unfinished) interchange which indicates one day, in the future, the route could continue westward.

== See also ==
- Atlanta freeway revolts
- Transportation in Atlanta
