= Georgia Transportation Efficiency Authority =

Transit authority in the U.S. state of Georgia

Agency overview
- Formed: May 12, 2026
- Preceding agencies: Georgia Regional Transportation Authority; Atlanta-Region Transit Link Authority
- Jurisdiction: Georgia, U.S.

The Georgia Transportation Efficiency Authority (GTEA) is a state agency in Georgia that administers federal transit funding and operates regional commuter bus service in metropolitan Atlanta.

GTEA was established by HB 297 (Act 708), signed into law by Governor Brian Kemp on May 12, 2026. The legislation dissolved the Georgia Regional Transportation Authority (GRTA) and recast the Atlanta-Region Transit Link Authority (ATL) as the new authority, transferring all responsibilities, staff, assets, and contracts of both agencies to GTEA. The bill was sponsored in the Senate by Majority Leader Jason Anavitarte.

Under HB 297, responsibility for regional transit planning was returned to local governments and the Atlanta Regional Commission. GTEA passes federal transit funds to selected local agencies.

== Operations ==
GTEA operates the Xpress regional commuter bus network, connecting suburban communities across the Atlanta metro area to downtown Atlanta. GTEA also reviews Developments of Regional Impact (DRIs) within its jurisdiction, a function previously carried out by GRTA.

== Governance ==
A 13-member board governs GTEA, comprising the Commissioner of the Georgia Department of Transportation and 12 others appointed by the Governor, the Lieutenant Governor, and the Speaker of the House of Representatives.

== See also ==
- State Road and Tollway Authority
