= State Road and Tollway Authority =

Government agency of the U.S. state of Georgia

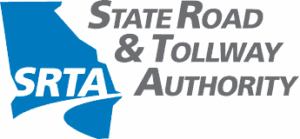

Agency overview
- Headquarters: 245 Peachtree Center Avenue, Atlanta, Georgia
- Agency executive: Jannine Miller, Executive Director
- Website: srta.ga.gov

The State Road and Tollway Authority (SRTA) is a government agency of the U.S. state of Georgia. It is responsible for financing transportation initiatives and operating the state's toll roads.

== History ==
The original State Tollway Authority was given the ability to issue bonds for the Georgia 400 extension in 1988. In 2001, the Georgia General Assembly expanded the State Tollway Authority's ability to raise funds for road construction, and the name was changed to SRTA.

A proposal to merge SRTA, the Georgia Regional Transportation Authority (GRTA), and most of GDOT's functions into a new State Transportation Authority was presented in the 150th Georgia General Assembly, however later in the legislative session a much more moderate plan was passed in March 2009, instead.

In 2017, SRTA merged offices and staff with GRTA. In May 2026, the Georgia General Assembly passed HB 297, abolishing GRTA and transferring its functions to the newly created Georgia Transportation Efficiency Authority. SRTA was unaffected by the legislation and continued to oversee road and tolling operations independently.

== Structure ==
SRTA's five-member board of directors is chaired by the Governor of Georgia. SRTA oversees the Georgia Express Lanes, Georgia Transportation Infrastructure Bank, and Peach Pass system.

Georgia Express Lanes are High-occupancy toll lanes that run alongside interstate highways in the metro Atlanta area. These include the I-75 South Metro Express Lanes, Northwest Corridor Express Lanes, and I-85 Express Lanes.
