= Toyota Research Institute =

Research and scientific development subsidiary

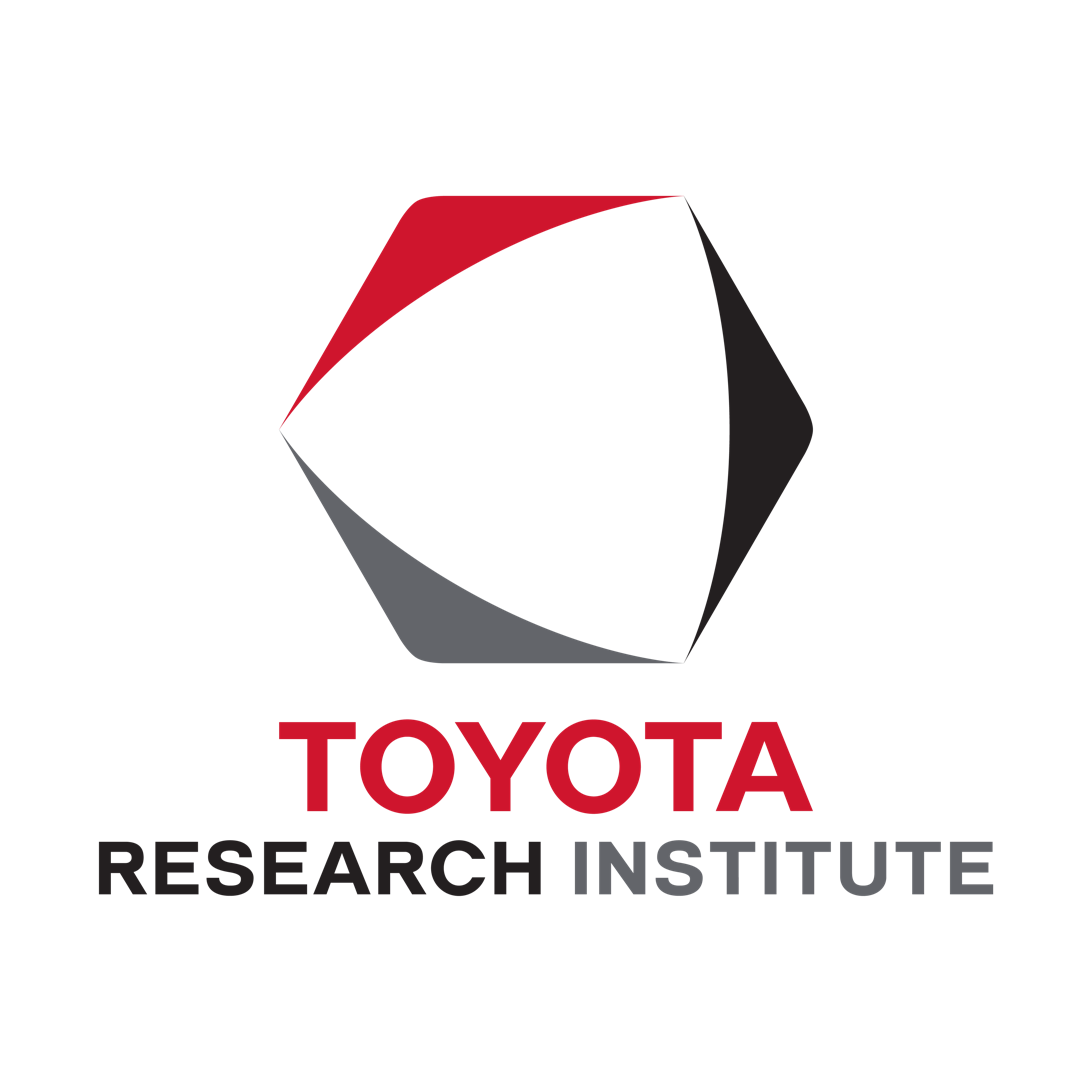
- Type: Private
- Industry: Automotive
- Founded: 2016
- Headquarters: Los Altos, California
- Area served: International
- Key people: Gill Pratt, CEO
- Parent: Toyota
- Website: https://www.tri.global/

The Toyota Research Institute is a research and scientific development subsidiary of Toyota Motor Corporation. It is focused on developing technologies in artificial intelligence (AI), vehicular automation, materials science, and robotics.

== History ==
Established by Toyota in 2016, Toyota Research Institute was launched with a $1 billion investment over five years to focus on artificial intelligence and robotics technologies research. The company began operations with Gill Pratt, a roboticist and former official at the Defense Advanced Projects Research Agency (DARPA), as its CEO. Its headquarters is in Los Altos, California, with additional offices in Cambridge, Massachusetts, and formerly in Ann Arbor, Michigan.

In 2018, Toyota established Toyota Research Institute – Advanced Development (TRI–AD), an offshoot of Toyota Research Institute in Tokyo, as a joint venture with Denso and Aisin to unify and strengthen Toyota's software for automated driving and safety. In January 2021, TRI–AD expanded and separately established Woven Planet Holdings, Inc. (now, Woven by Toyota, Inc.).

TRI is often confused with Toyota Research Institute of North America (TRINA), the first advanced research organization of Toyota R & D founded in North America in April 2008.
