= Georgia Regional Transportation Authority =

Former transit district in the U.S. state of Georgia

Agency overview
- Formed: March 23, 1999
- Dissolved: May 12, 2026
- Superseding agency: Georgia Transportation Efficiency Authority
- Jurisdiction: Georgia, U.S.
- Agency executives: Walter M. Deriso, Jr., Board Chairman; Richard A. Anderson, Board Vice Chairman
- Parent department: State Road and Tollway Authority
- Website: srta.ga.gov/grta/

The Georgia Regional Transportation Authority (GRTA, /ˈɡrɛtə/ "Greta") was a government agency that addressed mobility and air quality in the U.S. state of Georgia. It was set up under former governor of Georgia Roy Barnes, in order to address mobility, air quality and land use and how they relate to the transportation needs of metro Atlanta, including both roads and public transit. On May 12, 2026, Governor Brian Kemp signed HB 297 into law, abolishing GRTA and recasting the Atlanta-Region Transit Link Authority as the Georgia Transportation Efficiency Authority (GTEA).

GRTA's jurisdiction encompassed 13 Georgia counties in Metro Atlanta: Cherokee, Clayton, Coweta, Cobb, DeKalb, Douglas, Fayette, Forsyth, Fulton, Gwinnett, Henry, Paulding, and Rockdale.

== History ==
In July 1998, the Metro Atlanta Chamber of Commerce created a board to study the root causes of air pollution in Atlanta to avert the U.S. Environmental Protection Agency's threat of withholding $475 million in federal transportation funding from the region. The board presented several recommendations to then-Governor of Georgia Roy Barnes including the creation of a centralized regional planning authority. In January 1999, Barnes introduced legislation creating the Georgia Regional Transportation Authority to the Georgia Senate. The legislation was officially signed into law on March 23, 1999.

In June 2017, GRTA combined offices and staff with the State Road and Tollway Authority (SRTA).

In May 2026, the Georgia General Assembly passed HB 297, signed into law by Governor Brian Kemp on May 12, 2026. The legislation abolished GRTA and restructured the Atlanta-Region Transit Link Authority (ATL) into the Georgia Transportation Efficiency Authority (GTEA), transferring all assets, employees, and obligations of both agencies to the new authority. The bill also eliminated GRTA's eminent domain authority and reduced the statutory board from 31 members to a smaller body appointed by the governor, the lieutenant governor, and the Speaker of the House. The State Road and Tollway Authority was not affected and continued to oversee road and tolling operations separately.

== Xpress regional commuter coach service ==
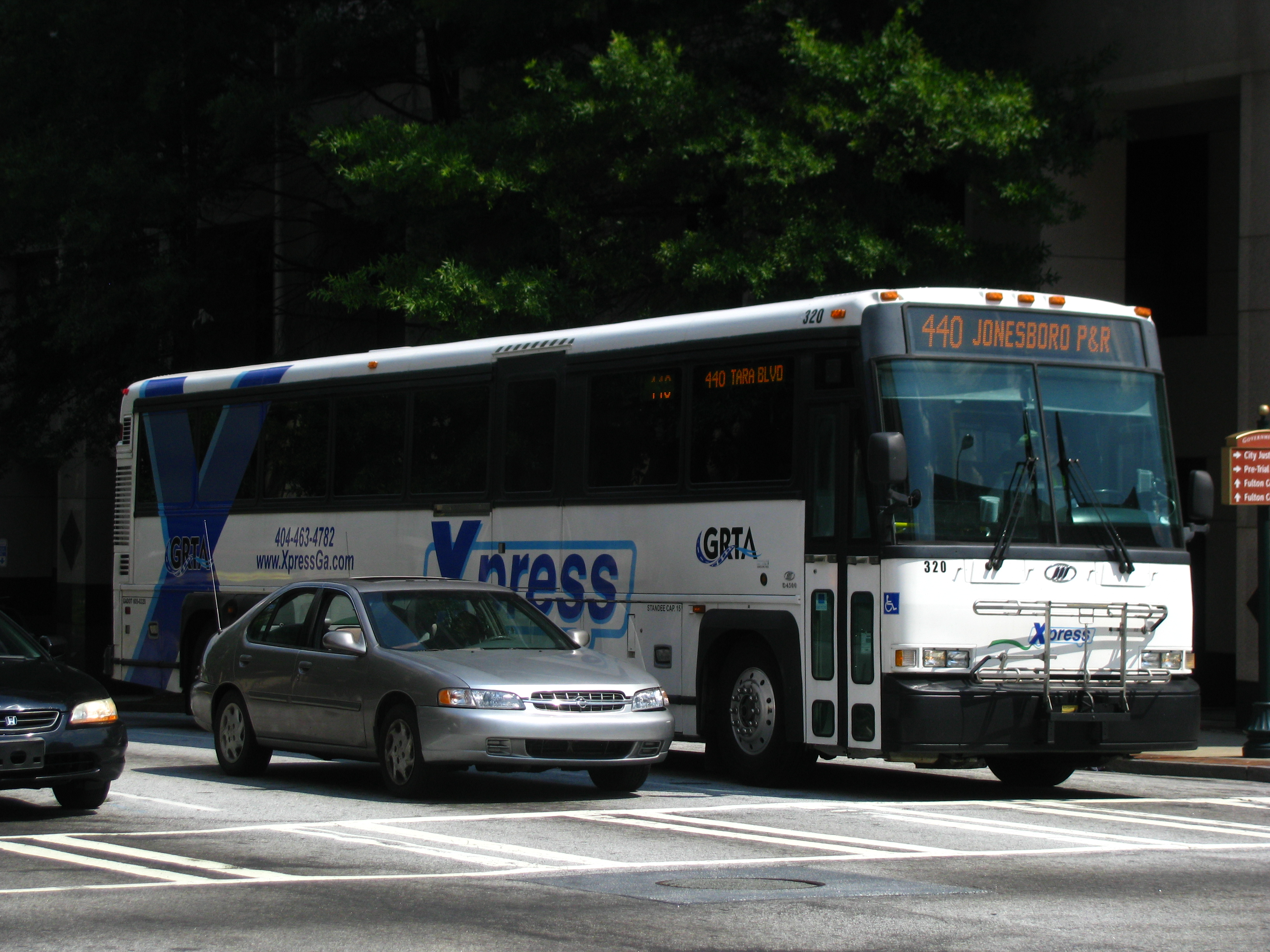
GRTA coach

GRTA operated Xpress, metropolitan Atlanta's first regional commuter bus system, from its start in 2004 until July 2020, when operations were transferred to the Atlanta-Region Transit Link Authority (ATL). Following the establishment of the Georgia Transportation Efficiency Authority in May 2026, which absorbed the ATL, Xpress operations continued under GTEA. As of June 2025, 15 Xpress routes were in operation, with service running roughly 5:30 a.m. to 9:30 p.m. weekdays, mostly during rush hours.

== See also ==
- Metropolitan Atlanta Rapid Transit Authority
- CobbLinc
- Ride Gwinnett
