= Roxy Theatre (Atlanta) =

Cinema in Atlanta, Georgia, U.S.

Coordinates: 33.759247°N 84.387722°W

The Roxy Theatre was a movie palace in Atlanta, Georgia. It was notable for showcasing the original Atlanta runs of such films as Spartacus, the 1962 The Music Man, the Technicolor Mutiny on the Bounty with Marlon Brando, and My Fair Lady. It was torn down in 1972 to make way for the Westin Peachtree Plaza, the hotel that was prominently featured in the 1981 film Sharky's Machine. It should not be confused with the Coca-Cola Roxy Theatre, originally the Buckhead Theatre, a different building in Buckhead. The Buckhead Theatre subsequently became the Capri Theatre and later closed, re-opening in 2010 under its original name Buckhead Theatre.

In July 2016, LiveNation and the Atlanta Braves announced that a theater with the name Coca-Cola Roxy will reside at the new SunTrust Park as part of The Battery Atlanta, the development surrounding the new stadium.

== See also ==
- House Of Blues
