= Coca-Cola Roxy =

Concert venue in Cumberland, Georgia, US

Coordinates: 33.8902°N 84.4697°W

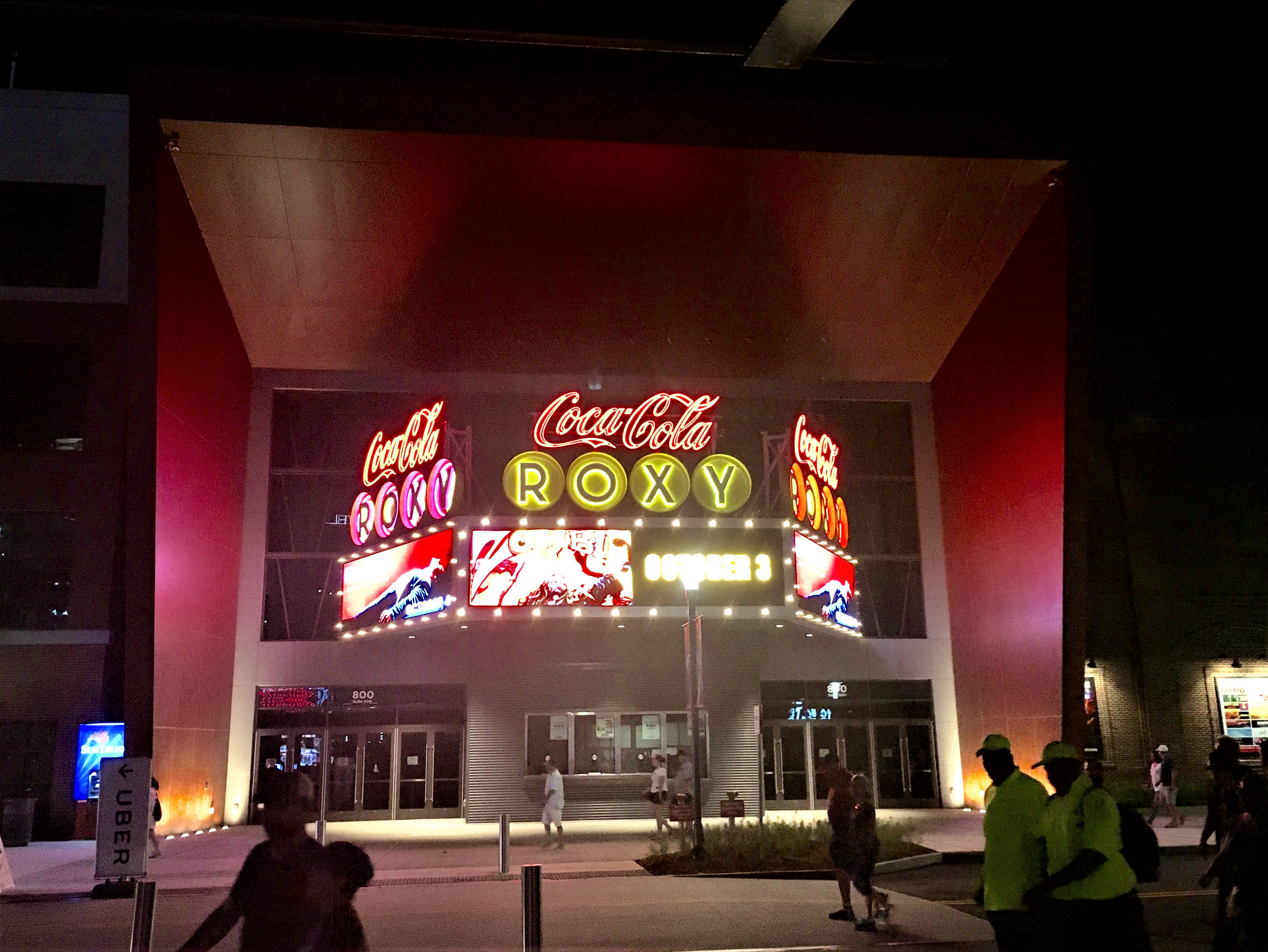
- Interactive map of Coca-Cola Roxy
- Address: 800 Battery Ave SE; Cumberland, Georgia 30339-5109
- Owner: Braves Entertainment Co. LLC
- Operator: Live Nation Atlanta
- Capacity: 3,600

Construction
- Opened: April 8, 2017
- Architects: Wakefield Beasley & Associates
- Structural engineers: Uzun & Case
- General contractor: Reeves Young
- Main contractors: Jonquil Steel & Construction

Website
- Official website

The Coca-Cola Roxy is a concert venue located in The Battery Atlanta in Cumberland, Georgia. Named after the old Roxy Theatre, the venue opened in April 2017.

== History ==
On July 16, 2015, the Atlanta Braves and concert promoter Live Nation Entertainment announced a deal to develop and manage the long-planned entertainment venue adjacent to Truist Park. Named in homage to the old Roxy Theatre that was torn down in 1972, the venue was announced to have standing-room-only capacity for 4,000 and feature about 40 music and comic shows annually, was designed to help drive activity to the site on non-gamedays, and planned to host special events.

The Coca-Coca Roxy officially opened on April 8, 2017, with Radio 105.7's 4th Birthday Bash featuring Glass Animals.

== Layout ==
The 53,000 square feet (4,900 m^{2}) theater consists of two tiers. The floor area is flat, unlike similar venues, such as the Tabernacle, that slope upward. Upstairs is a permanent seating area that consists of 800 seats. There are four public bars in the venue, with a fifth located in the VIP room.
