= New Atlanta Stadium =

New Atlanta Stadium may refer to:

- Mercedes-Benz Stadium
- Truist Park
