= The Battery Atlanta =

Mixed-use development near Truist Park in Cobb County, Georgia

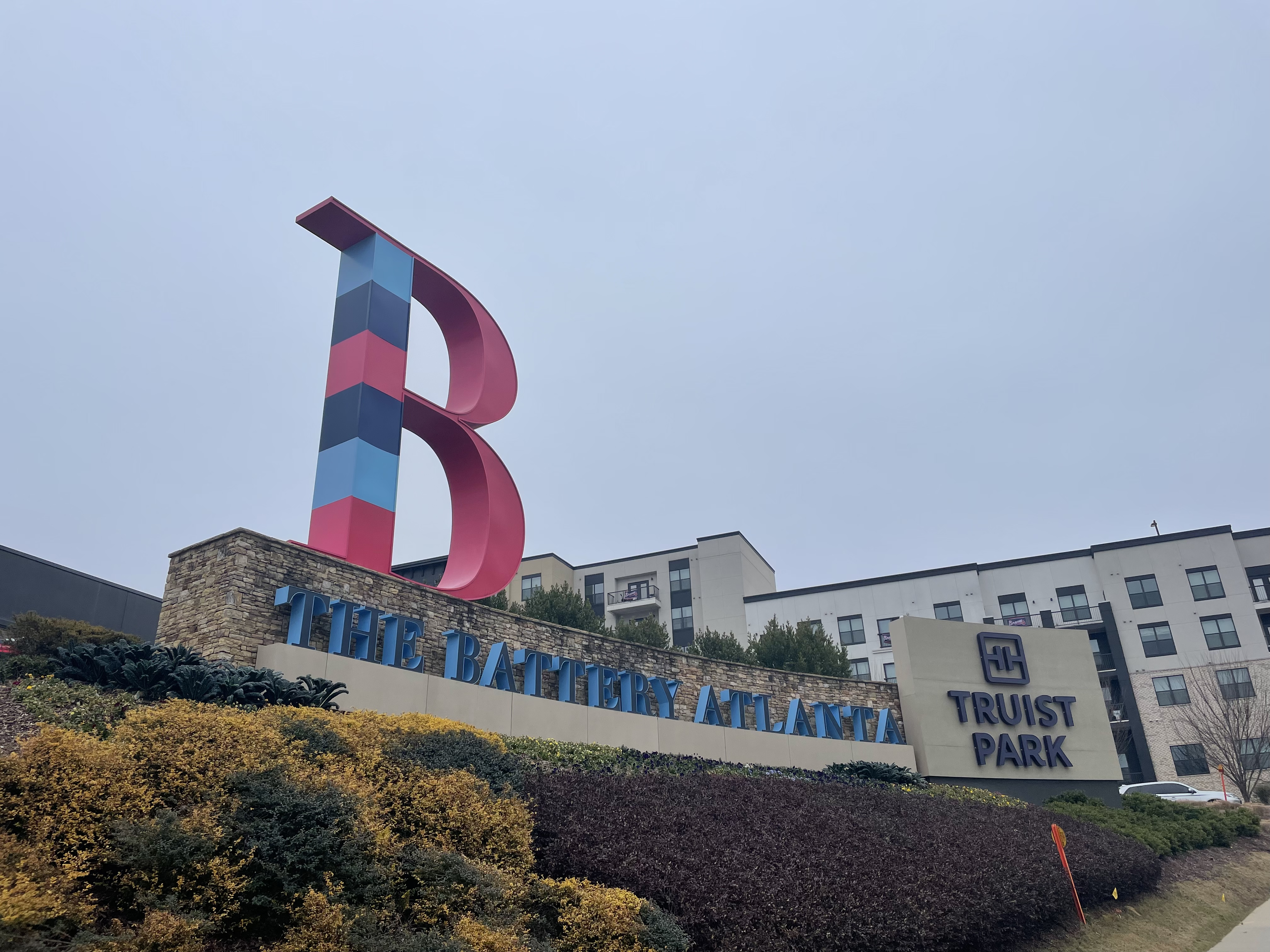
- Corner of Cobb Parkway and Circle 75 Parkway
- Interactive map of The Battery Atlanta
- Location: Atlanta, Georgia, U.S.
- Address: 800 Battery Ave SE
- Coordinates: 33°53′14″N 84°28′17″W
- Groundbreaking: September 16, 2014
- Opening: 2017
- Use: Mixed-use development
- Website: batteryatl.com

Companies
- Architect: Wakefield Beasley & Associates
- Owner: Atlanta Braves Holdings Inc.

Technical details
- Cost: $400 million
- Leasable area: 400,000 sq. ft. (approx.)
- Proposed: November 20, 2013

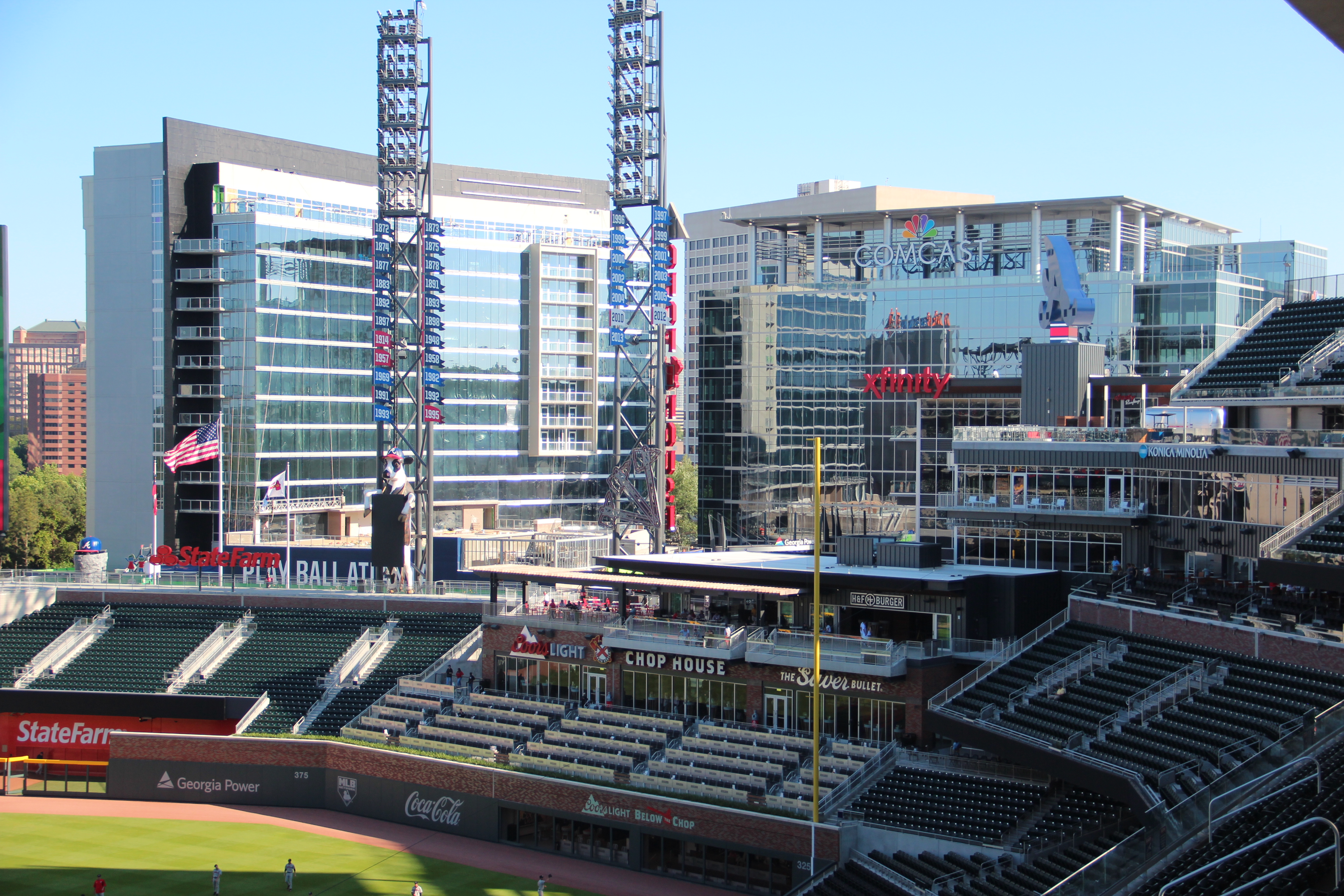
The Battery Atlanta high rises viewed from then-SunTrust Park in May 2017

The Battery Atlanta is a mixed-use development located in the Atlanta metropolitan area, approximately 10 miles (16 km) northwest of downtown Atlanta in the unincorporated community of Cumberland, in Cobb County, Georgia. It is adjacent to Truist Park (originally SunTrust Park), home of the Atlanta Braves of Major League Baseball (MLB). The complex is a mix of shops, dining, living and workspace in the area surrounding the ballpark.

== Planning ==
On November 20, 2013, the Braves unveiled plans to build a $400 million entertainment district that would surround its new ballpark planned for Cobb County, Georgia. The district would feature a street lined with retail, restaurants, and bars leading up to the stadium. The $400 million is entirely funded by the Braves and their development partners. On October 14, 2015, the Atlanta Braves announced that the complex would be called The Battery Atlanta.

On December 10, 2014, the Braves released new renderings of the planned entertainment complex surrounding the ballpark. The new renderings further define the public spaces and show a blend of architectural styles, with a blend of steel, brick and glass facades. Derek Schiller said in a conference call with reporters that the rendering represent the concept of project's look, and is not the final design. But the locations of buildings and streets demonstrated in the designs are largely settled. Two taller glass towers, a hotel and an office building, will feature views into the ballpark. The complex also will feature a brewpub and Braves store. The Braves named architectural design firm Wakefield Beasley & Associates as the lead designer of the mixed-used project surrounding the stadium.

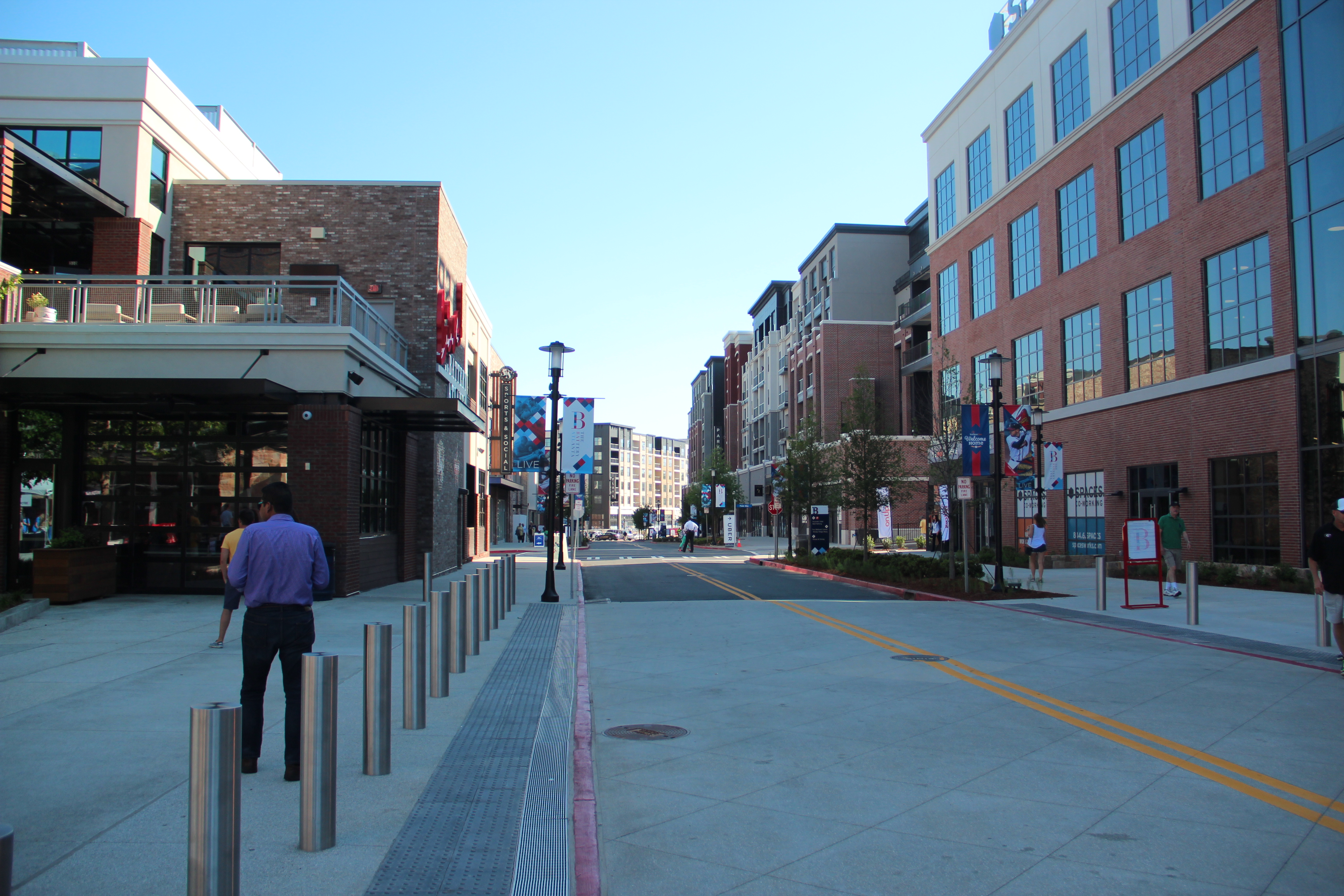
A street in The Battery Atlanta in May 2017

On March 17, 2015, the Braves announced a partnership with Comcast, under which Comcast will provide high-tech infrastructure for the ballpark and will become an anchor tenant at The Battery Atlanta. Comcast will occupy 100% of a nine-story office building in the mixed-use development adjacent to the stadium. The office tower, which will overlook the ballpark, will become Comcast's Southeast regional headquarters. According to Braves chairman and CEO Terry McGuirk, Comcast will "lend its expertise to drive the most technologically advanced ballpark and mixed-use development ever built." Some 1,000 Comcast employees will work at the office building, most of them new hires. The office also will include an "innovation lab" for new technologies.

On April 28, 2015, the Braves announced a 50-50 partnership with Omni Hotels & Resorts on a luxury hotel to be built overlooking the ballpark. The full-service hotel will have 16 floors and 264 rooms. It also will feature a two-story restaurant, rooftop hospitality suites, and an elevated pool deck with views into the ballpark. The Atlanta Braves will be the 50/50 owners with Omni Hotels & Resorts. On August 14, 2017, the hotel announced that James Beard Foundation Award-winning chef and author Hugh Acheson will open his eighth restaurant, Achie's, within the luxury hotel. The Omni Hotel at The Battery Atlanta opened on January 3, 2018.

On July 16, 2015, the Braves and concert promoter Live Nation announced a deal to develop and manage the long-planned entertainment venue adjacent to the ballpark. The venue is called the Coca-Cola Roxy in homage to the old Roxy Theatre that was torn down in 1972. The venue has standing-room-only capacity for 4,000 and features about 40 music and comic shows annually. The theater is designed to help drive activity to the site on non-gamedays and it also plays host to special events.

The first restaurants announced for The Battery Atlanta were Antico Pizza, Cru Food and Wine Bar, Tomahawk Taproom featuring Fox Bros. Bar-B-Q, chef Ford Fry's Superica restaurant, and a new steak concept by chef Linton Hopkins.

On May 19, 2016, the Braves announced several new signed tenants at The Battery Atlanta including Wahlburgers, Harley-Davidson, and Goldbergs Bagel Co. & Deli. Venue developer Cordish Cos. plans a trio of concepts including a Professional Bull Riders Association Bar & Grill, featuring a mechanical bull.

== Current status ==
The Battery Atlanta contains a 264-room hotel, apartments, office buildings, shops, bars and restaurants.

On November 17, 2020, Papa John's Pizza announced its new global headquarters would be moved to Three Ballpark Center at The Battery Atlanta.

== See also ==
- Ballpark Village — a similar mixed-use development adjacent to Busch Stadium, home of the St. Louis Cardinals
- Metropolitan Park — a planned mixed-use development adjacent to Citi Field, home of the New York Mets
