= Ross Rossin =

Bulgarian-American artist

Ross R Rossin
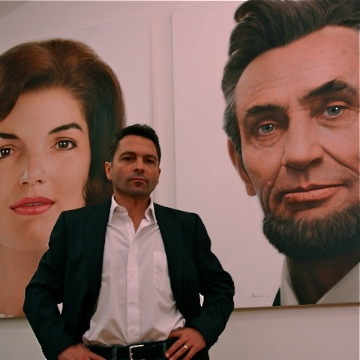
- Portraits by Rossin of Jackie Kennedy and President Abraham Lincoln
- Born: Rossen Raytchev Raykov; March 23, 1964 (age 62); Russe, Bulgaria
- Occupations: Portrait artist, sculpture, public speaker
- Spouse: Ava Rossin (1990– Present)
- Writing career
- Language: English
- Genre: Realism
- Notable works: AARON, YOUNG, FREEMAN, and ANGELOU for the National Portrait Gallery
- Website: www.rossinfineart.com

Ross R Rossin (born Rossen Raytchev Raykov; March 23, 1964) is a Bulgarian-born American artist known for his large-scale, hyper-realist portraits of contemporary and historical figures. Rossin's native city of Ruse and its Baroque architecture, strong influence from Vienna, and traditional appreciation of culture were major influences in his early artistic life and currently are recognizable in his work.

== Early life and training ==
Rossin was born on March 23, 1964, in Russe, Bulgaria, located near the Danube River. At twelve years old, Rossin was introduced to oil painting techniques in local master's studios. In 1978, Rossin was accepted to the prestigious National High School of Fine Arts in Sofia, Bulgaria, where for five years he was instructed in classical drawing, painting, sculpting, art history, anatomy, and aesthetics. From 1985 to 1991, Rossin studied painting in the National Academy of Art, Sofia, Bulgaria where he graduated cum laude with a Masters of Art degree.

== Professional work ==
=== Overseas ===
From 1991 to 1996, Rossin visited and worked in Japan for five months each year. During this time he completed over 150 portraits and traveled throughout the cities of Japan, including Tokyo, Osaka, Kyoto, Kobe, Marioka, Sapporo, Fukuoka, Chiba, Hakodate and Himeji. He was commissioned for portraits for both business leaders and political figures. He later returned to the European market, painting both commissions and hosting personal exhibitions in France, England, Germany, and Belgium. During this period, his most noted works include the President of the Republic of Bulgaria, the President of the Republic of Cyprus, and the Lebanese Patriarch (which now hangs in the Vatican).

=== United States ===
In 1999, Rossin began exhibiting his work in the United States. In the spring of 2001, Rossin began working with his current business partner, Karen Hudson, and the two developed Portrait Partners Inc. Rossin, his wife Ava, and their newborn son Michael moved to Atlanta, GA on a permanent basis that fall. In 2010, Rossin became a United States citizen.

Once in the United States, Rossin has focused his professional work on both contemporary and traditional portraits. Rossin's large-scale painting, "A Meeting in Time" was unveiled at the Booth Western Art Museum. The thirteen foot tall by twenty foot wide piece depicts the presidents of the 20th century gathered in the Cross Hall of the White House. Later, two additional paintings were commissioned to complete the three centuries of US presidents. All three paintings reside in the same room in the Booth Western Art Museum, and were part of Rossin's Southwest Exhibition in 2021.

In the first decade of the new millennium, Rossin created a collection of large-scale portraits called "American Royalty". The portraits in this collection include Abraham Lincoln, George Washington, Audrey Hepburn, Jackie Kennedy and Babe Ruth.

The Smithsonian’s National Portrait Gallery has four portraits done by Rossin.

-Legendary Civil Rights leader, close associate to Dr. Martin Luther King, Congressman, and two time Mayor of Atlanta, Ambassador Andrew Young. It was acquired by the Smithsonian in 2010.

-World famous movie star, Morgan Freeman sat for Rossin in 2012. The portrait was acquired by the Smithsonian in the following year.

-Rossin did the portrait of the baseball legend, Hank Aaron in 2010 and the portrait was acquired by the Smithsonian in 2010.

-America's greatest poet of the 20th century, Maya Angelou, sat for her portrait shortly after her 86th birthday in 2013. The portrait was acquired and unveiled in the Smithsonian's National Portrait Gallery in April 2014.

On April 7, 2015, the US Postal Service unveiled the national forever stamp dedicated to the late Maya Angelou using Rossin's portrait in the Smithsonian's National Portrait Gallery.

In October–November 2016, Rossin had a solo exhibition in the Palace of Nations, U.N Headquarters in Geneva, Switzerland. He presented a collection of large-scale portraits of ordinary people he met in his travels around the world, mostly in India, as well as extraordinary individuals he met like Desmond Tutu in South Africa, President Jimmy Carter, CNN founder Ted Turner and others. The exhibition was opened by the director-general of the United Nations and it was called "Ultimately Human".

On March 29, 2017, Rossin's nine foot bronze statue of Hank Aaron was unveiled at the newly opened Suntrust Park Stadium in Atlanta, GA.

In April 2017, Rossin had a solo exhibition in the Russian Parliament, Duma, presenting ten large-scale portraits of legendary Russian historical and cultural figures. His portrait of Leo Tolstoy was accepted and is part of the permanent collection of the Leo Tolstoy State Museum in Moscow, Russia.

In May 2021, Rossin had a solo exhibition in the Booth Western Art Museum in Cartersville, Georgia, showcasing both the three-part US presidential paintings, as well as 35 paintings based on his travels to the American Southwest.

== Rossin and Rotary ==
Rossin was introduced to Rotary International during the nineties in Japan. He joined the Sofia Rotary Club in 1998. After moving to the US in 2001, he joined the Rotary Club of Buckhead, Atlanta. In 2008, Rossin became a member of the Rotary Club of Atlanta, where he later served as a vice-president of international affairs. Since 2016, Rossin is sitting on the board of directors of the Atlanta Rotary. In 2010 Rossin painted a large scale portrait of Rotary's founder Paul Harris. The portrait was auctioned off and collected $170,500 for the Rotary Foundation's Polio Plus Campaign. Today, this portrait hangs in Rotary International Headquarters in Evanston, Illinois. Rossin has been named a Polio Free World Hero.

== Rossin and Emory ==
Since the fall of 2016, Rossin is part of the advisory board at the Center for Ethics at Emory University.

== Rossin and the Georgia Historical Society ==
In 2019, the Georgia Historical Society presented Rossin with the John Macpherson Berrien Award for a lifetime of achievement in the field of Georgia history and for outstanding service to the organization. Among his contributions, Rossin sculpted a bust of Vince Dooley for the organization's Vincent J. Dooley Distinguished Teaching Fellows program, which recognizes national leaders in the field of history whose contributions have enhanced or changed the way the public understands the past.

== Personal life ==
In 1983, Rossin was a senior at the National School of Fine Arts "Ilia Petrov" in Sofia, when he met his future wife, Ava. They married on December 15, 1990. Ava has traveled extensively with Rossin for exhibit tours and portrait commissions worldwide. The two welcomed their first child, Michael in 1999, and their daughter, Savannah, in 2005. They reside in Atlanta, Georgia.

== Other notable works ==
- King George VI for Queen Elizabeth in honor of her Diamond Jubilee
- U.S. President George W. Bush and George H. W. Bush for The George Bush Presidential Library
- U.S. President Theodore Roosevelt for the Theodore Roosevelt Association
- President Reagan for the February 2011 Newsmax cover
- Former US Attorney General Judge Griffin Bell for Mercer University and the law firm, King & Spalding
- Senator Paul Coverdell for the University of Georgia
- Senator Saxby Chambliss for the US Senate Capitol Building in Washington, D.C.
- Governor Sonny Perdue for the Minnesota State Capitol
- Former presidents of the Coca-Cola Company, Roberto Goizueta and Douglas Ivester
- Founder of The Home Depot, Arthur Blank, for the Arthur Blank Family Foundation
- Former Georgia Attorney General, Mike Bowers
- Professor Archibald Cox for Harvard Law School.
- Dean Robert C. Clark for Harvard Law School
- President William Chace for Emory University
- Governor Tim Pawlenty for the Minnesota State Capitol l
- Former Secretary of the U.S. Department of Health and Human Services, Dr. Louis Sullivan for Morehouse School of Medicine
- Attorney E. Ginger Sullivan, J.D. for Morehouse School of Medicine
- Bust of Vincent J. Dooley for the Georgia Historical Society

== Exhibitions ==
- 1991 – 1995 Works with Gallerie Reich, Cologne, Germany
- 1995 – 1997 Represented by Alain Blondel Gallery, Paris
- 1995 – 1998 Represented by Roy Miles Gallery, London
- 1991 – 1995 Salon D'Automne, Paris
- 1996 Solo Exhibition, Gallery Racines, Bruxelles
- 1997 Foire Internationale D'art Contemporain, Paris
- 1999 Solo Exhibition, Adonis Gallery, London
- 2008 Solo Exhibition, Hal Barry Properties, Atlanta, USA
- 2021 Solo Exhibition, Booth Western Art Museum, Cartersville, USA
