= Truist Park =

Baseball park in Metro Atlanta, Georgia

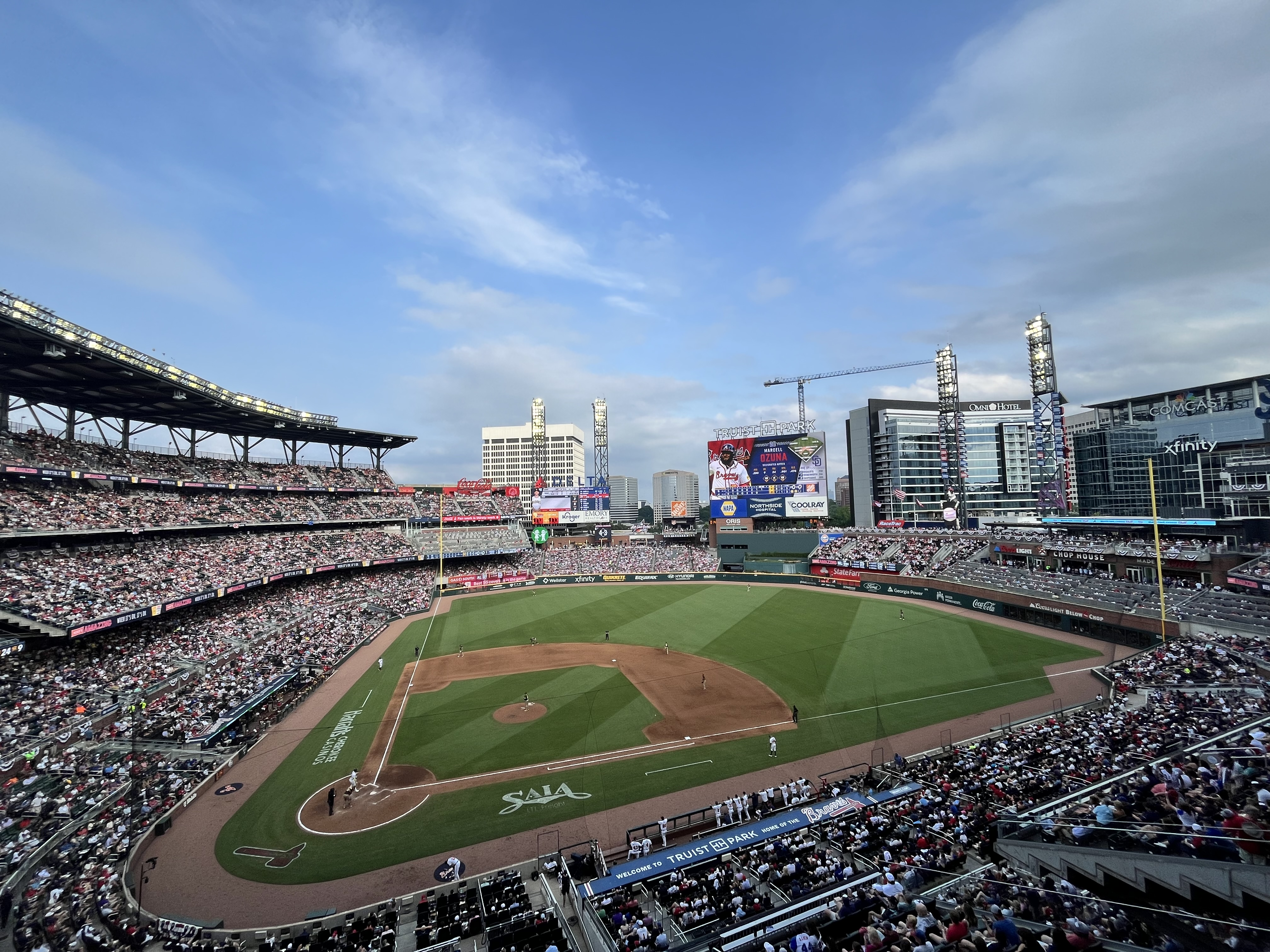
- Truist Park in 2025

- Location in the Atlanta metro area Location in Georgia Location in the United States
- Former names: SunTrust Park (2017–2020)
- Address: 755 Battery Avenue SE
- Location: Cumberland, Georgia, U.S.
- Coordinates: 33.89°N 84.468°W
- Owner: Cobb-Marietta Coliseum and Exhibit Hall Authority
- Operator: Atlanta National League Baseball Club Inc.
- Capacity: 41,108
- Surface: Seashore Paspalum, Platinum TE
- Record attendance: 43,619 (August 17, 2019 vs. Los Angeles Dodgers)
- Field size: Left field – 335 ft (102 m); Left-center – 385 ft (117 m); Center field – 400 ft (122 m); Right-center – 375 ft (114 m); Right field – 325 ft (99 m)
- Public transit: Truist Park: CobbLinc bus route 10A (weekdays only); Cumberland Transfer Center: MARTA bus route 12; CobbLinc bus routes 10, 10B, 20, 25, 50

Construction
- Groundbreaking: September 16, 2014
- Opened: March 31, 2017 (exhibition game); April 8, 2017 (college game, official opening); April 14, 2017 (regular season)
- Cost: $622 million
- Architect: Populous
- Project manager: Jones Lang LaSalle
- Structural engineer: Walter P. Moore and Associates
- Services engineers: M–E Engineers, Inc.
- General contractors: American Builders 2017 (a joint venture between Brasfield & Gorrie, Mortenson Construction, Barton Malow and New South Construction)

Tenant
- Atlanta Braves (MLB) (2017–present)

Website
- mlb.com/braves/ballpark

Truist Park is a baseball stadium in the Atlanta metropolitan area, approximately 10 miles (16 km) northwest of downtown Atlanta in the unincorporated community of Cumberland, in Cobb County, Georgia. Opened in 2017, it is the ballpark of Major League Baseball's Atlanta Braves. The ballpark was originally named SunTrust Park after SunTrust Bank and was renamed Truist Park in 2020 following the bank’s merger that created Truist Financial.

The stadium was constructed in a public–private partnership with a project budget of $622 million. Cobb-Marietta Coliseum & Exhibit Hall Authority issued up to $397 million in bonds for the project. The county raised an additional $14 million from transportation taxes and $10 million cash from businesses in the Cumberland Community Improvement District. The Braves contributed the remaining money for the park and The Battery Atlanta. In March 2015, a security filing from Braves owners Liberty Media allotted $672 million for Truist Park and $452 million for The Battery Atlanta, which adds up to a total cost of above $1.1 billion. The Braves will spend $181 million over 30 years to help pay off the county's bonds on the project.

The Braves hosted a soft opening for season ticket holders on March 31, 2017, in a preseason game against the New York Yankees. The first regular season game at the park was held on April 14, 2017, against the San Diego Padres.

== History ==
=== Leaving Turner Field ===
On November 11, 2013, the Braves announced that the franchise would leave Turner Field for a new park after the 2016 season. Turner Field had been the home of the Braves since the 1997 season. It was originally built as Centennial Olympic Stadium for the 1996 Summer Olympics, but was designed from the ground up to be converted into a baseball-only stadium after the Olympics ended—even though this eliminated the possibility of its use for other events such as track and field. The stadium was owned by the Atlanta-Fulton County Recreation Authority (AFCRA) and leased to the Braves for twenty years. The Braves had full control over the ballpark's operations. Turner Field was a relatively new facility, younger than 13 of the other 29 major league stadiums, but there were numerous issues that led the Braves to seek a new ballpark.

According to vice chairman John Schuerholz, Turner Field needed $350 million in renovations—$150 million for structural upkeep and $200 million to improve the fan experience. Braves executive vice president Mike Plant has stated that capital maintenance would be much less at Truist Park. While Turner Field was designed from the ground up with the Braves in mind, Plant said that it would require higher capital maintenance costs because it was value-engineered for the 1996 Summer Olympics. This has led to higher capital maintenance costs in the long run. Plant estimated that capital maintenance costs at Truist Park would be significantly less expensive than the maintenance needed for Turner Field after 17 years.

Braves executives said that fans were unwilling to come to games in Turner Field's later years due to metro Atlanta's infamous traffic congestion. They also claimed that parking around the stadium is inadequate; Turner Field was under-served by about 5,000 parking spaces. In addition, Plant has noted the downtown location "doesn't match up with where the majority of our fans come from." Plant said that while the Braves operated Turner Field, they had no control over the commercial development around the stadium. Other baseball stadiums built in recent years have been accompanied by nearby shopping and entertainment.

According to Plant, the Braves entered talks with the recreational authority to extend the team's original lease in 2013, but those talks broke down. Atlanta mayor Kasim Reed said the city could not afford to support the kind of renovations the Braves desired, especially while already funding the construction for Mercedes-Benz Stadium for the National Football League's Atlanta Falcons.

=== Planning ===
In summer 2013, the Braves and the Cobb County Commission Chairman Tim Lee made a short list of possible locations in Cobb County. The location chosen for the park was next to the highway interchange between Interstate 75 and Interstate 285. The Braves claim the location is "near the geographic center of the Braves' fan base." which is approximately 8,000 fewer than Turner Field.

In January 2017, the Braves announced that the new park would have more than 11,000 parking spaces owned or leased by the organization for game day. This is 2,500 more spaces than were available at Turner Field. The Braves announced a private shuttle service that serves managed parking lots and key points of interest in metro Atlanta. In order to reduce traffic congestion, the Braves announced that games played Monday through Thursday would start at 7:30 pm. Games at Turner Field started at 7 pm on those days. There are approximately 30,000 parking spaces within 2 miles (3.2 km) of the stadium.

The baseball stadium occupies 15 acres (6.1 ha) of a 60-acre (24 ha) lot, with the remainder of the space devoted to parking, green space, and mixed-use development. Although Truist park is over 10 miles (16 km) from the nearest train station, the Braves use a "circulator" bus system to shuttle fans to and from the stadium.

=== The Battery Atlanta ===
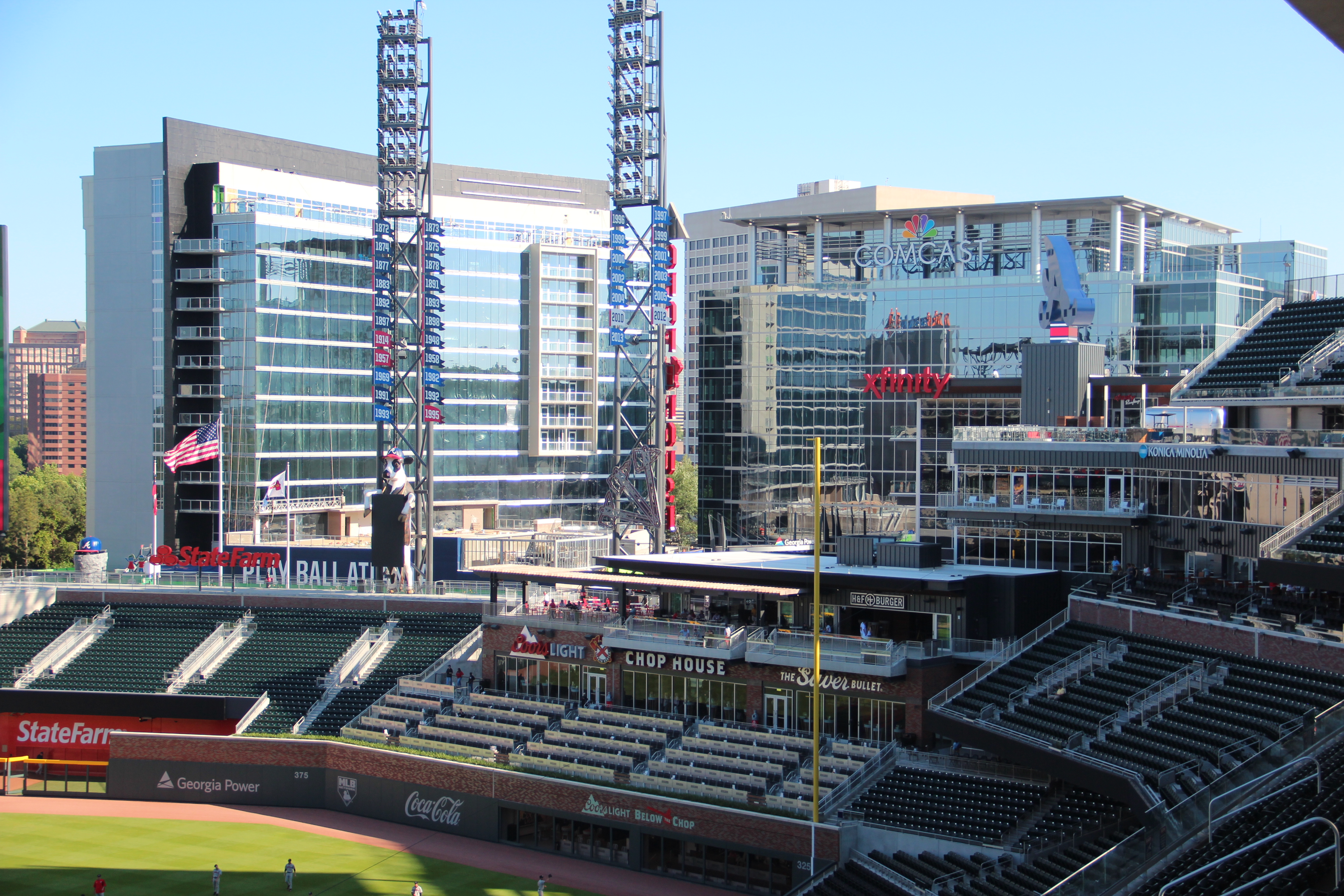
The Battery Atlanta high rises viewed from then-SunTrust Park in May 2017

On November 20, 2013, the Braves unveiled plans to build a $400 million entertainment district to surround the ballpark. The complex, called The Battery Atlanta, contains a mix of shops, dining, living and workspace in the area surrounding the ballpark. It opened in stages starting in 2017.

=== Design ===
The Braves chose Populous to design the new ballpark. Populous has designed 19 of the 30 Major League stadiums currently in use including LoanDepot Park, Target Field, and Yankee Stadium. The Braves picked Populous over HKS, Inc. who served as a consultant for the Braves prior to the selection of Populous.

On May 14, 2014, the Braves released the first renderings of the new stadium. The ballpark has a southeast orientation. Two factors ended up determining the placement of the park: the topography of the land and the location of gas lines on the property. Before the ballpark was built a comprehensive sun study was conducted by the team and designers that determined the orientation would not be an issue.

The stadium is built into a sloped, rocky landscape, allowing fans to enter from a middle level and descend to their seats. Due to the limited amount of space available on the site, the ballpark was designed with a more vertical layout than typical Major League Baseball stadiums. As a result, spectators are positioned closer to the field compared to the setup at Turner Field. The farthest seat in the upper deck is situated 21 feet (6.4 m) nearer to the field than the corresponding seat in the Braves’ former home. A defining feature of the ballpark's design is its extensive use of brick, which reflects masonry patterns commonly seen in the Southeastern United States. Braves executive vice president of sales and marketing, Derek Schiller, described the exterior as having a sense of "timelessness". In addition to brick, the Braves incorporated pre-cast stone into the design. Schiller noted that this material creates the appearance of being "custom hand-laid" and is prominently featured at the stadium's entryways. He further explained that elements such as porches, canopies, varied angles, and trellises were intentionally integrated into the masonry, not only to provide shade but also to enhance the architectural warmth and scale of the structure.

Earl Santee, managing director of Populous, emphasized the importance of collaboration with the project's master planners. He stated that his team played a significant role in ensuring the ballpark seamlessly integrated with the surrounding development, which he considered crucial to the project's success. According to Santee, the result was "a fully integrated experience that's never been seen in baseball before."

=== Construction ===
On April 16, 2014, Atlanta Braves and Cobb County officials outlined the timetable for the new stadium's construction. Site clearing started in June 2014, after the Cobb County commission vote on May 27, 2014. The Atlanta Braves held a formal groundbreaking ceremony on September 16. The ceremony took place at the site near the northwest intersection of Interstates 75 and 285.

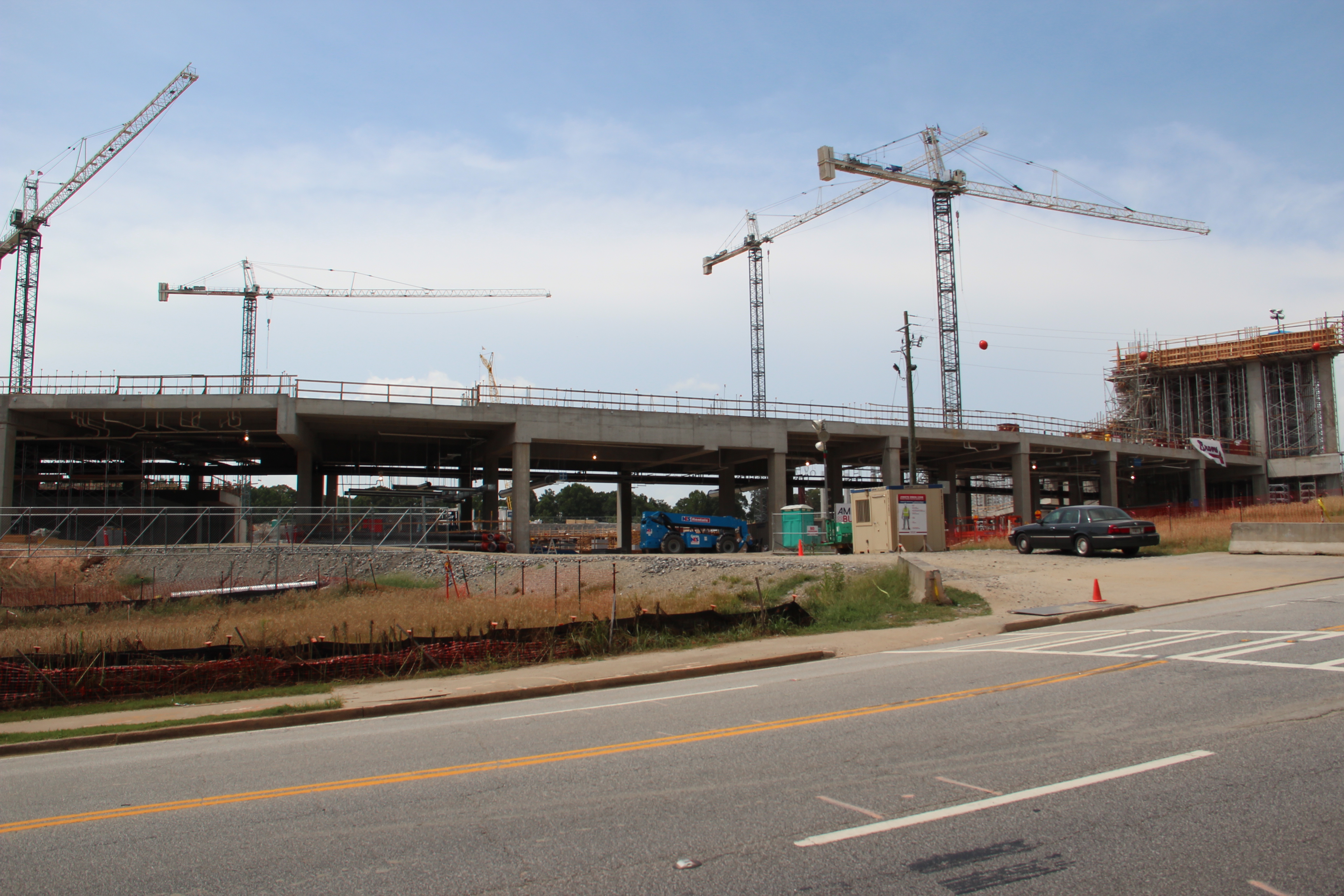
Then-SunTrust Park under construction, July 2015

In order to start construction three natural gas lines that ran under the property had to be moved. The high cost of moving the gas lines is one of the key reasons the land had not been developed. The cost to move the lines was $14 million. The pipelines were moved to the perimeter. Two of the lines, which run about 8 feet (2.4 m) underground, are owned by Colonial Pipeline Company, and the third belongs to Atlanta Gas Light Company. The project was completed in early November 2014.

In November 2014, workers started drilling the holes for the pylons around the outside perimeter of the stadium's footprint. Phase one of construction for both the stadium and mixed-use development began in November 2014 and included infrastructure for the site, such as sewer, water and electrical systems. The retention walls for the underground service level of the stadium were also built. The underground level has a few hundred parking spaces for players, team doctors, clubhouse staff and management staff. By May 2015, crews had installed all the caissons to stabilize the foundation. With the caissons complete, the crews began to pour concrete for the decks.

On August 27, 2015, the Atlanta Braves held a ceremony for the first brick laid of 775,000 bricks that made up the main exterior at Truist Park. On hand for the ceremony were dignitaries from the Braves, Cobb County government, and ballpark sponsors. The first brick was laid by Eutis Morris, 83, who laid the first concrete block at Fulton County Stadium and placed the first and last bricks at Olympic Stadium, which later became Turner Field. Also laying bricks were former Atlanta Braves player Hank Aaron and the team's first baseman at the time Freddie Freeman. The team also sealed two time capsules. The capsules included a video of the ballpark ground breaking; parts of the Big Chicken; a 1948 World Series program; dirt from both older stadiums; a baseball signed by the 1995 championship team; and recordings from team broadcasters.

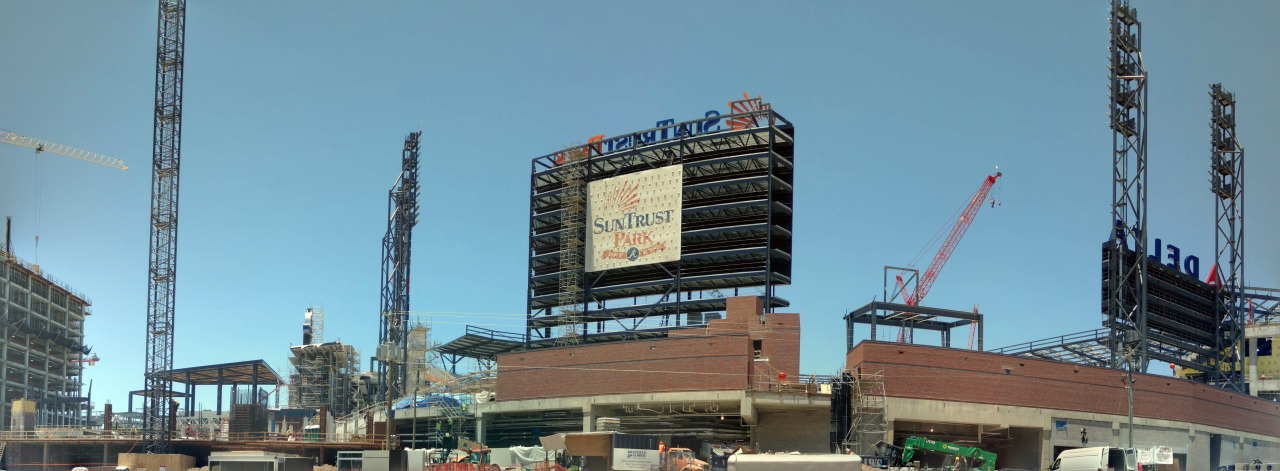
Then-SunTrust Park under construction, July 2016

In June 2016, construction started on a pedestrian bridge to connect SunTrust Park with the Cobb Galleria. The bridge spans Interstate 285. To fund construction, Cobb county used $5 million given by the Cumberland Community Improvement District, about $4.5 million in federal grants, $380,000 from the Atlanta Braves and about $159,000 from a special taxing district in Cumberland created to help fund the new Braves stadium's construction.

In July 2016, the installation of the seats for the new ballpark started. Also, the installation of hundreds of LED lights were installed along the edge of the ballpark's canopy from the right-field foul pole to home plate. Additionally, a large, light-up tomahawk was installed. Meanwhile, the 108,000 square foot (10,000 m^{2}) metal canopy that covers about 60 percent of these seats was completed. In August 2016, the canopy, lights and seating bowl were completed and the last crane remaining on the field area was removed.

By January 2017, the majority of the ballpark’s exterior construction had been completed. After the Braves wrapped up their 2016 season, the team began the process of vacating Turner Field, temporarily placing equipment in a warehouse. In December of that year, staff started transferring office furnishings and equipment to the new stadium, and on December 19, employees officially began settling into their new workspaces. Around the same time, progress on the playing field advanced, with installation of drainage and irrigation systems followed by layers of gravel, sand, and soil. The formation of the pitcher’s mound, infield, and warning track also took place in December, and the final layer of topsoil for the turf was added in January.

The Braves received the certificate of occupancy for the entire ballpark on February 24, 2017. With seats, video boards and most other elements already installed, the sod was one of the last missing pieces of the new ballpark. Workers began the installation of 109,000 square feet (10,100 m^{2}) of sod on March 4, 2017, a task that took two to three days to complete.

== Opening ==
Stadium firsts	Statistics
First game	April 14, 2017; Braves 5, Padres 2
Ceremonial first pitch	Hank Aaron
First pitch	Julio Teherán
First batter	Manuel Margot (Padres)
First hit	Ender Inciarte
First home run	Ender Inciarte
First win	Julio Teherán
First save	Jim Johnson
First postseason game	October 8, 2018; Braves 6, Dodgers 5

The 2017 season was the team's first in Truist Park. The Atlanta Braves defeated the New York Yankees 8–5 in an exhibition game on March 31, 2017, in their first game in the ballpark.

On January 25, 2017, the Braves announced that the University of Georgia and University of Missouri would play the first baseball game in Truist Park on April 8, 2017. The Georgia-Missouri game was also the first time the stadium was open to the general public. The teams drew in 33,025 spectators as Missouri beat Georgia 6–1. Missouri's Trey Harris hit the first home run.

The Braves' regular-season opener was held on April 14, 2017. During pregame ceremonies, the Braves unveiled the team's 10 retired numbers on a left-field facade, and seven of the 10 individuals represented—Hank Aaron, Bobby Cox, Tom Glavine, Chipper Jones, Dale Murphy, Phil Niekro, and John Smoltz—took part in the festivities. The ceremonial first pitch was thrown by Aaron, with Cox serving as catcher. Aaron had also thrown the ceremonial first pitch for the Braves' first and last games at Turner Field. The Braves would defeat the San Diego Padres 5–2. Braves center fielder Ender Inciarte recorded the first out, first hit, first run, and first home run in the new ballpark. Starting pitcher Julio Teherán, who earned the final win at Turner Field, earned the first win at the new park.

=== Naming rights ===
In 2014, Atlanta-based SunTrust Banks bought the initial naming rights to the stadium for 25 years. In February 2019, SunTrust Banks announced a merger with BB&T to create what would become Truist Financial; Braves officials stated that the SunTrust Park name would remain in place during the 2019 season. On January 8, 2020, crews began removing SunTrust Park signs from the stadium. On January 14, 2020, the Braves and Truist Financial formally announced that the ballpark's name would change to Truist Park.

== Features ==
=== Configuration ===
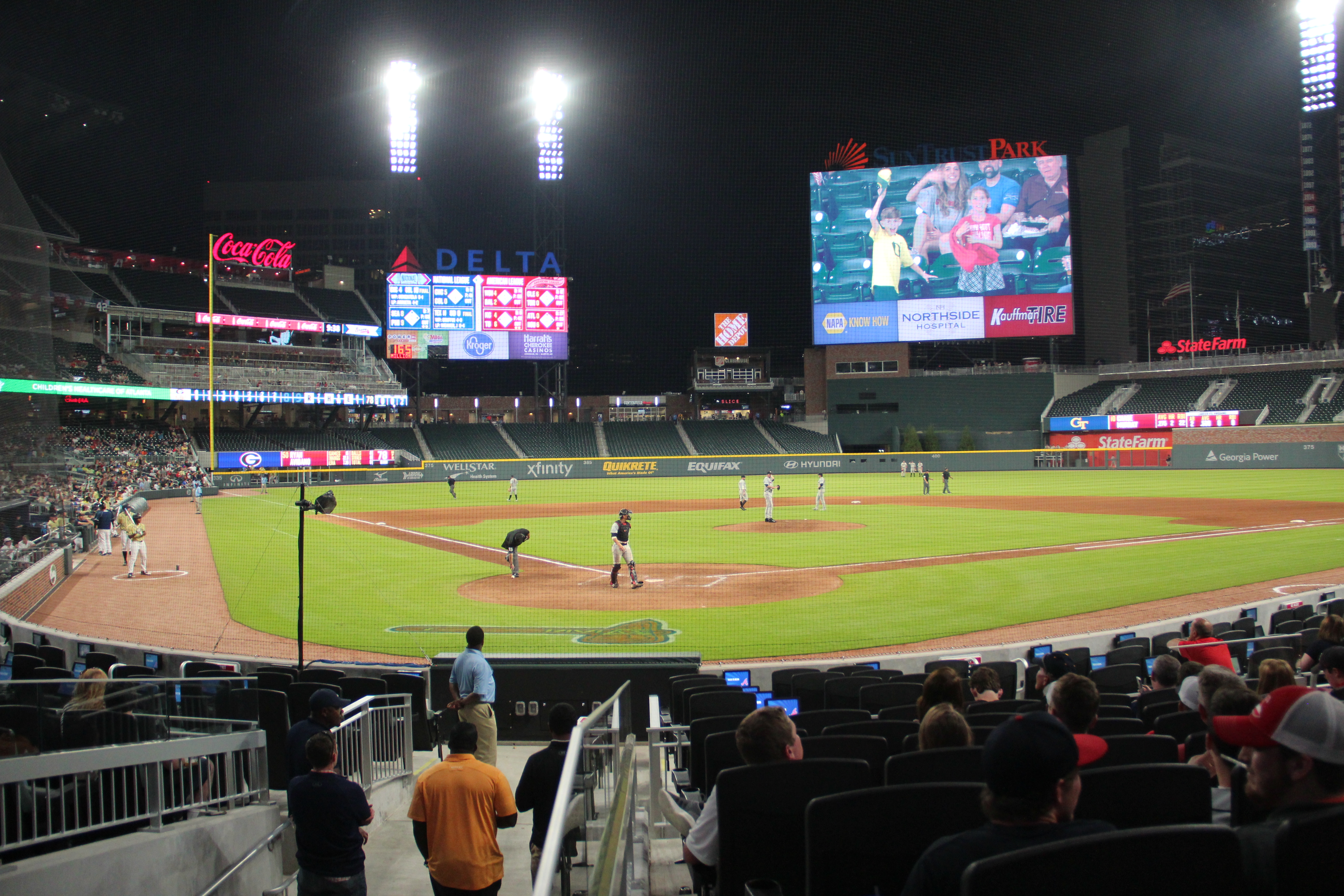
Then-SunTrustPark at night, lighted with LED

The ballpark features an intimate configuration, placing a higher percentage of seats in close proximity to the field than any other ball park in Major League Baseball. Braves executive vice president of sales and marketing Derek Schiller stated that the seating bowl is aimed at putting fans closer to the action, not by reducing the amount of foul territory, but with cantilever designs that push the middle and upper bowls toward the field. The ballpark also includes a 90 feet (27 m) wide canopy horseshoeing around the stadium's top and air conditioning on every level to ensure that fans remain cool on hot summer days. The existing topography of the property has been integrated into the design. The Braves are using LED lights for the stadium. LED lights provide better quality for fans in the stands and watching on TV. LED lights also reduce the time it takes to restore lighting in case of a power outage.

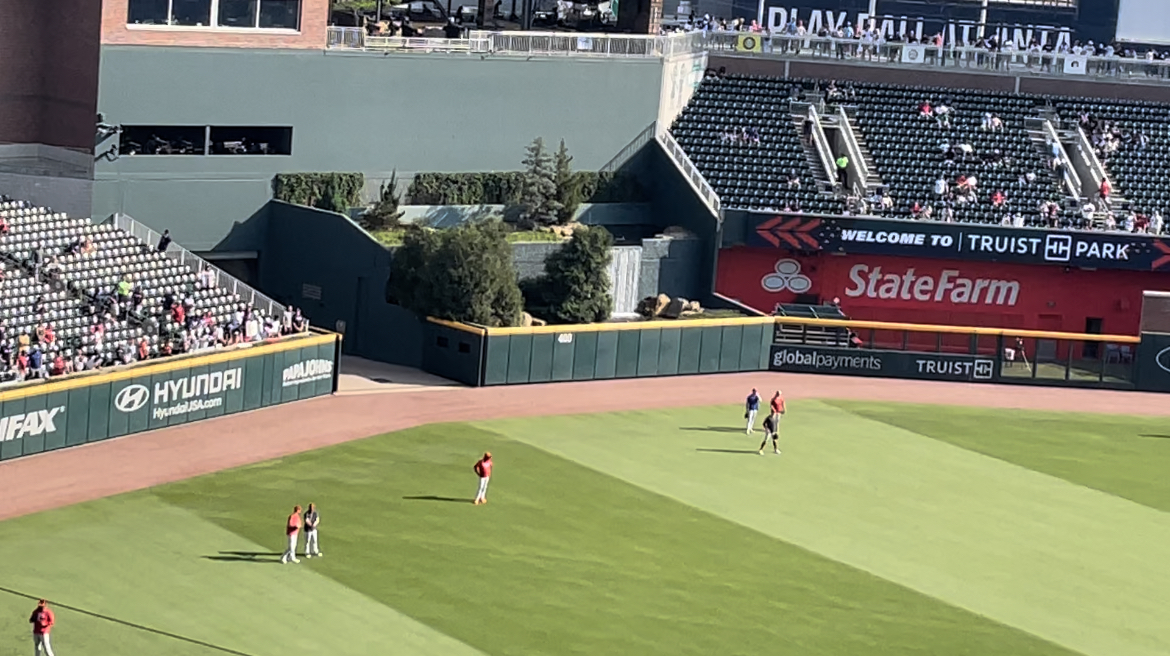
The water feature at Truist Park

=== Water feature ===
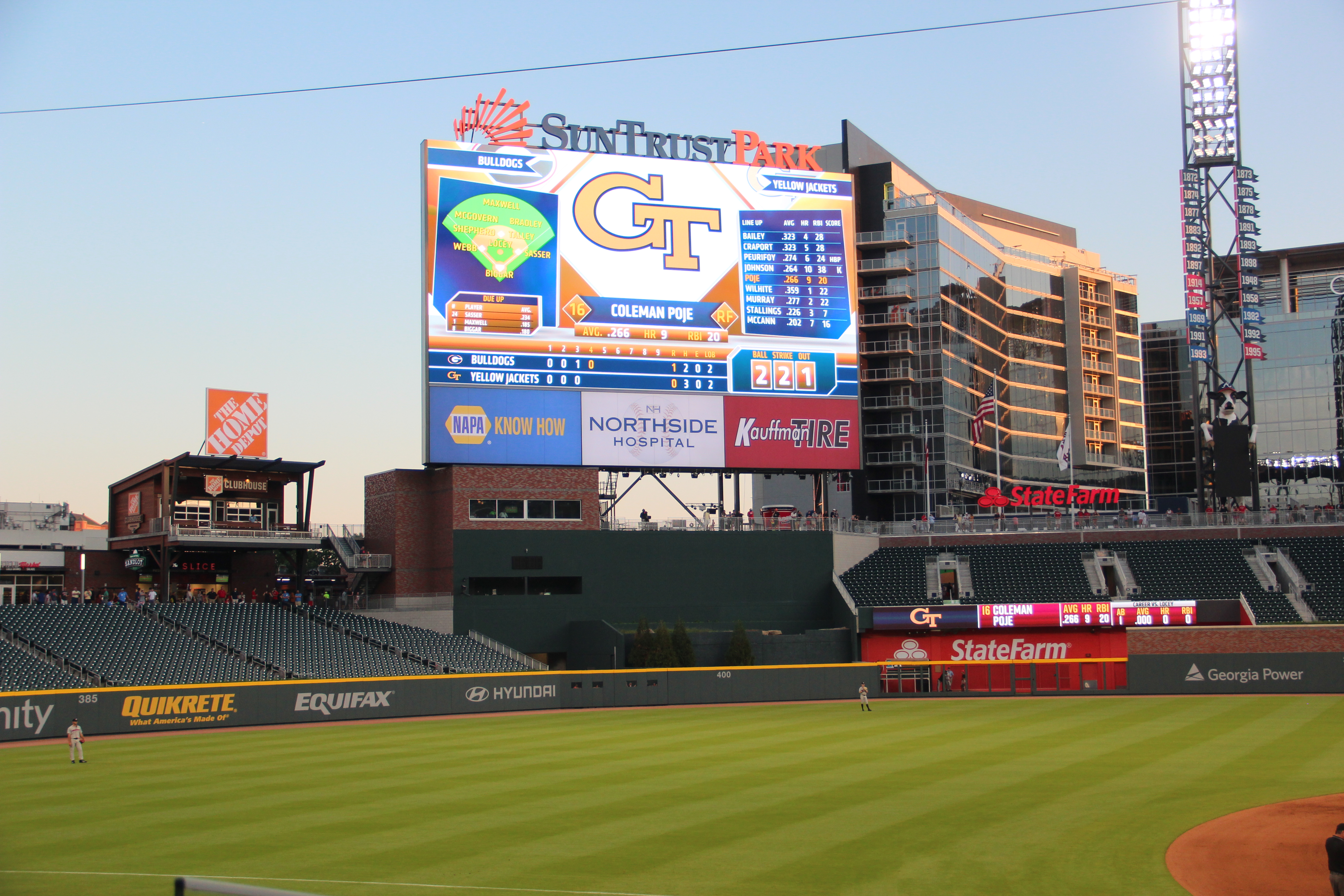
Then-SunTrust Park's batter's eye. Evergreen trees are planted below the video board.

Beyond the center-field wall, the batter's eye area at Truist Park features three evergreen trees, creating a natural backdrop for hitters. Reports indicate that the Braves took inspiration for this design from a similar setup at Coors Field, home of the Colorado Rockies. The area also includes boulders and a waterfall. A fountain within the feature sends streams of water up to 50 feet (15 m) into the air toward the main video board, activating in celebration of Braves home runs and victories.

=== Foul ball protection ===
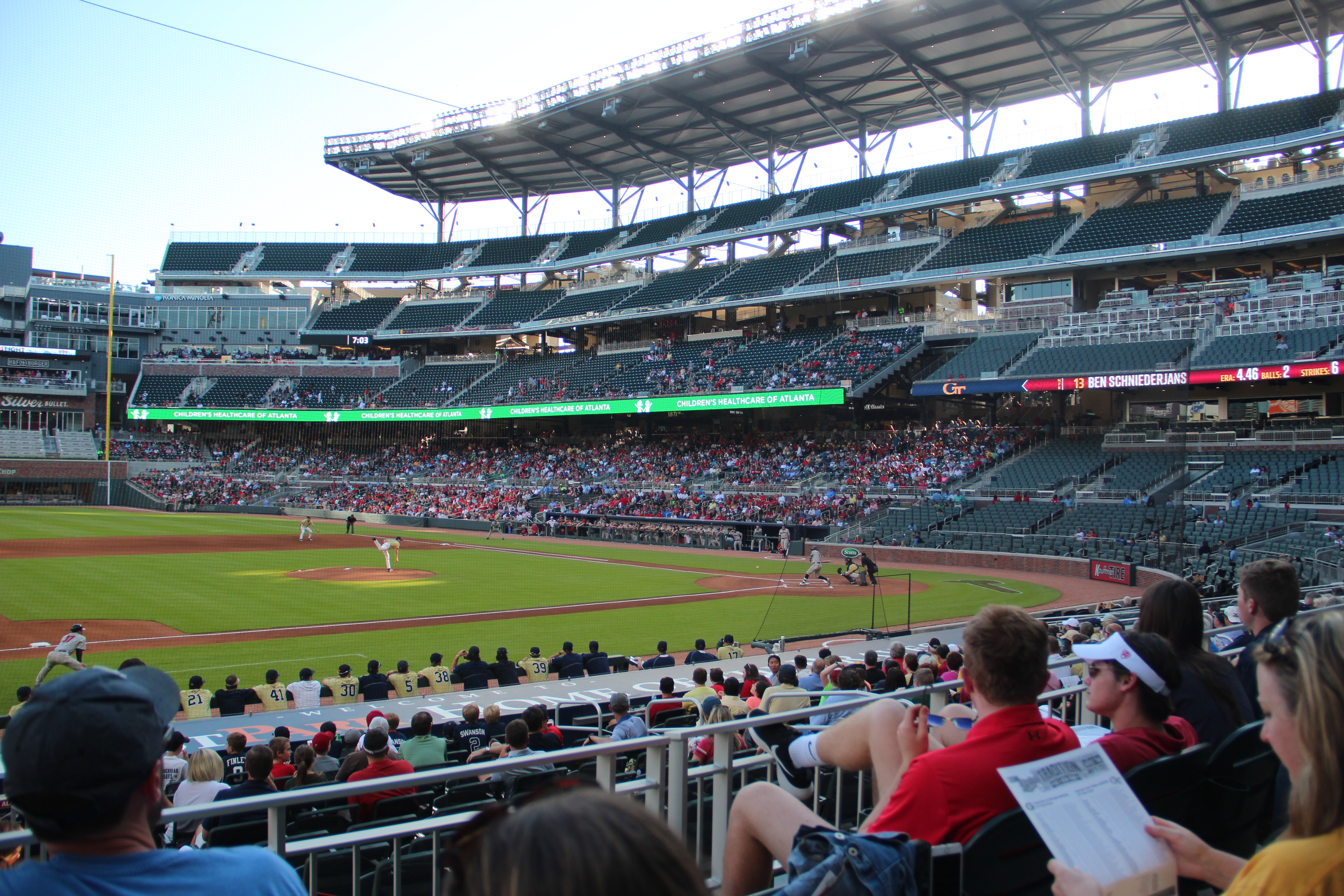
View of Truist Park around third base, with visible foul ball netting

Truist Park includes expanded protective netting to guard against foul balls. According to Braves field director Ed Mangan, the netting extends 145 feet (44 m) down the third-base line and 149 feet (45 m) down the first-base line. While this coverage surpasses that of the team's former home, Turner Field, the netting itself is slightly shorter, measuring 31.5 feet (9.6 m) in height compared to Turner Field's 35 feet (11 m). Braves president Derek Schiller explained that this height difference results from the ballpark's structural design and the placement of the cables supporting the screen. Schiller also noted that advancements in protective netting technology have allowed for thinner yet stronger materials, which, he stated, "cover the most number of seats with the least view issues as possible."

=== Playing surface ===
The Braves chose Seashore Paspalum, Platinum TE as the grass for their stadium. In 2012, they had previously replaced the Tifway 419 hybrid Bermuda grass in Turner Field's infield with paspalum, aiming to create a slower playing surface that would benefit their infielders. However, the Bermuda grass remained in the outfield, while foul territory areas were also converted to paspalum. At Truist Park, paspalum covers the entire playing field. This grass variety is commonly used on coastal golf courses and can also be found at Daikin Park.

Ahead of the 2023 season, the Braves changed to a hybrid Bermuda overseed with perennial Ryegrass.

=== Monument Garden and statues ===
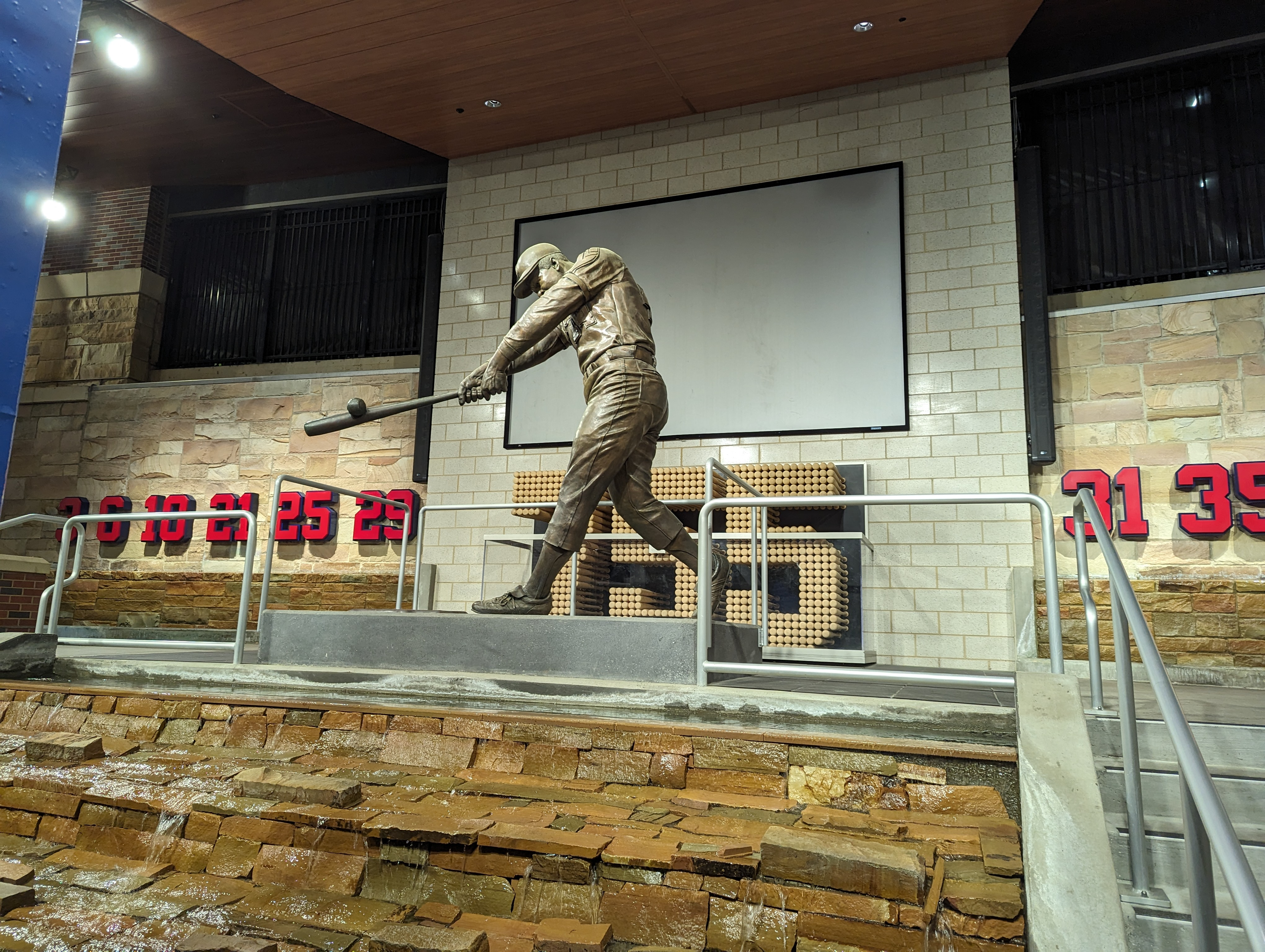
Statue of Hank Aaron in the Monument Garden

Unlike Turner Field, Truist Park does not have a stand-alone Braves museum. However, a well-appointed space in the main concourse behind home plate, Monument Garden, displays many highlights of franchise history. The Monument Garden features audio, light and water elements. The Braves partnered with Atlanta-based A-R-T & Associates to create a visual experience for Braves fans. The baseball-centric artwork highlights nostalgic moments throughout Braves franchise history. The 300-piece installation consists largely of original artwork ranging from portraits to action scenes, and complemented by macro photography, oversized vintage baseball cards and a LEGO brick mosaic. The Braves took memorabilia from the Ivan Allen Jr. Braves Museum & Hall of Fame at Turner Field and incorporated it throughout the ballpark.

The focal point of Monument Garden is a statue of Hank Aaron. The statue was created and unveiled by Atlanta-based artist Ross Rossin. The statue captures the moment on April 8, 1974, at Atlanta-Fulton County Stadium when Aaron broke Babe Ruth's long-standing 714 career home-run record. Behind the statue is a sculpture made of 755 baseball bats in honor of Aaron's career home-run total. A video screen plays an Aaron biography and other statues are placed throughout the stadium. The bat and ball from his 715th home run are displayed in the Hank Aaron Terrace above left field.

On April 13, 2017, the Braves unveiled a statue of former manager Bobby Cox. The new statue joined two other statues outside the ballpark featuring legends of the Braves franchise. The other statues include Warren Spahn and Phil Niekro.

=== Technology ===
The stadium is equipped with a Wi-Fi network that on an average gameday can support 10,000-14,000 concurrent users access. The system is robust enough for everyone in a sold-out ballpark to simultaneously post a selfie. On a Friday or Saturday with big crowds, the system reaches 8.3 terabits of data. The stadium features 250 miles (400 km) of single mode fiber optic lines, 500 miles (800 km) of CAT6A lines, and 1,350 802.11ac access points: 900 in the ballpark, 450 in the adjacent Battery. There are 1,350 Panasonic televisions that are installed throughout the ballpark.

== Public reaction ==
=== Announcement and polls ===
After the new stadium was announced, citizens organized campaigns both supporting and opposing the plan, which was made public only two weeks before the Cobb County Commission voted. More than 80% of county residents supported delaying the vote. Cobb Chairman Tim Lee and Commissioner Helen Goreham insisted that vote could not be delayed because it would threaten the stadium's timeline.

An InsiderAdvantage/FOX 5 poll released on November 25, 2013, showed that 59% of registered voters in Cobb County favored building a new stadium for the Braves. However, support fell to 30% of Cobb County voters when they were asked if they'd support funding the stadium with Cobb County tax dollars, with 56% opposed and 14% undecided. On September 8, 2014, the University of Florida's Department of Tourism, Recreation and Sports Management released the first independent scientific poll on Cobb residents' attitude toward the public investment in the stadium. The survey found that 55% of the survey respondents would have supported the stadium in a referendum.

=== Public hearing and vote ===
Two weeks after the Atlanta Braves announced the new stadium project, the Cobb County Commission held a public hearing to vote on whether to approve the plan. Residents who both supported and opposed the plan began crowding into the meeting hall hours before the 7 p.m. hearing was to begin, many sporting "Cobb: Home of the Braves" T-shirts. After a one-hour public comment on the new stadium project, the Cobb County Commission voted 4–1 to approve a memorandum of understanding with the Atlanta Braves. On May 27, 2014, the Cobb County commissioners voted unanimously, 5–0, on the operating agreement that bound the county to borrow up to $397 million to build the Braves new stadium.

=== Appeal and aftermath ===
Retired businessman Larry Savage, attorney Tucker Hobgood, and Austell resident Rich Pellegrino filed notices of appeal with the Georgia Supreme Court, to argue against issuance of the bonds. Attorneys Lesly Gaynor Murray and Blake Sharpton of law firm Butler Snow, the county's bond counsel, represented Cobb in the Supreme Court. The appeal was heard by the Georgia Supreme Court in February 2015. On June 29, 2015, the Georgia Supreme Court unanimously upheld the bond authorization. The failed appeal represented the last legal challenge to the SunTrust Park project.

In July 2016, Cobb County commissioner Tim Lee lost his bid for re-election to challenger Mike Boyce. Boyce had called the election a delayed referendum on the stadium deal, but Lee pointed to four other commissioners who were re-elected promoting the Braves.

=== Ballpark reputation ===
The ballpark opened to positive reviews. Woody Studenmund of the Hardball Times called the park a "gem" and he was impressed with "the compact beauty of the stadium and its exciting approach to combining baseball, business and social activities." J.J. Cooper of Baseball America praised the "excellent sight lines for pretty much every seat." Cooper also noted that "the Wi-Fi works and it's very fast, even with a park full of smartphone users."

For the first half of the opening season many believed that the new ballpark favored hitters. In May 2017, Braves manager Brian Snitker said, "Everybody is going to like hitting here, not just left-handers." Despite the speculation, Truist Park is neither favoring pitchers or hitters according to MLB park factors.

=== Attendance ===
Home attendance at Truist Park
Year	Total attendance	Game average	Stadium capacity by %	Major League rank by #
2017	2,505,252	30,929	75.3%	13th
2018	2,555,781	31,552	76.8%	12th
2019	2,654,920	32,776	79.8%	12th
2020	0*	0*	NA	NA
2021	2,300,247	29,490	71.8%	2nd
2022	3,129,931	38,641	94.0%	4th
2023	3,191,505	39,401	95.9%	5th
2024	3,011,755	37,182	94.0%	4th
2025	2,903,167	35,841	87.2%	8th

(*) – There were no fans allowed in any MLB stadium in 2020 due to the COVID-19 pandemic.

== Notable events ==
The Atlanta Braves hosted Games 3, 4, and 5 of the 2021 World Series at Truist Park, marking the first time World Series games were played at the stadium. Atlanta won Games 3 and 4 before falling in Game 5. Truist Park was also the site of the 95th Major League Baseball All-Star Game on July 15, 2025, the first time the event was held at the venue. The National League won the game via a swing-off tiebreaker, and Kyle Schwarber was named All-Star MVP.

Truist Park has also hosted other non-baseball events such as a college football game on November 17, 2018, between Kennesaw State University and Jacksonville State University. The ballpark has served as a concert venue for numerous musical acts such as Lady Gaga, Metallica, and Billy Joel.

== See also ==
- List of Major League Baseball stadiums
- Lists of stadiums

Preceded by Turner Field	Home of the Atlanta Braves; 2017–present	Succeeded by current
