= Bulloch =

Bulloch is a surname, and may refer to

- Angela Bulloch (born 1966), British artist
- Archibald Bulloch (c. 1730–1777), American lawyer and politician
- Archibald Bulloch Jr. (1775– 1859), American businessman
- Gordon Bulloch (born 1975), Scottish rugby player
- Irvine Bulloch (1842–1898), American Confederate Navy officer
- James Dunwoody Bulloch (1823–1901), American overseas agent for the Confederate States
- James Stephens Bulloch (1793–1849), Scottish-American settler of Georgia and grandfather of Theodore Roosevelt
- Jeremy Bulloch (1945–2020), British actor
- Martha Bulloch (1835–1884), mother of Theodore Roosevelt
- William Bellinger Bulloch (1777–1852), American politician
- William Gaston Bulloch (1815–1885), American physician
- Willie Bulloch (1895–1962), Scottish footballer

== See also ==
- Bulloch County, Georgia
- Bulloch Hall
- Bullock (disambiguation)
