= Bulloch Hall =

Historic house in Roswell, Georgia

- U.S. National Register of Historic Places
- U.S. Historic district – Contributing property
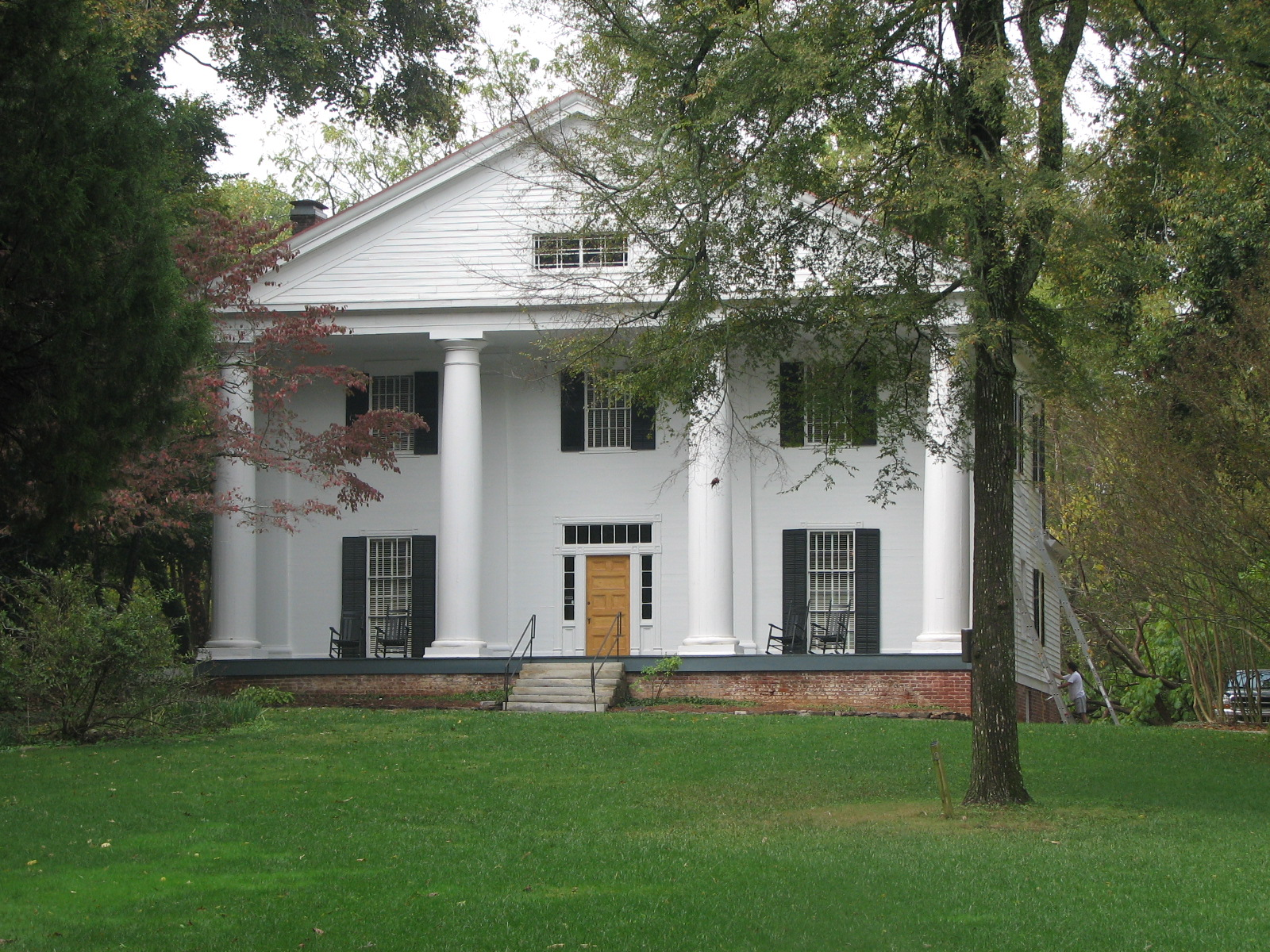
- Bulloch Hall is where Theodore Roosevelt's parents were married, in December 1853.

- Location within Georgia Location within the United States
- Interactive map showing the location of Bulloch Hall
- Location: 180 Bulloch Avenue, Roswell, Georgia
- Coordinates: 34°0′54.51″N 84°22′4.17″W
- Built: 1839–1840
- Built by: Willis Ball
- Architect: James Stephens Bulloch
- Architectural style: Greek Revival
- Part of: Roswell Historic District (ID74000682)
- NRHP reference No.: 71000276

Significant dates
- Added to NRHP: May 27, 1971
- Designated CP: May 2, 1974

Bulloch Hall is a Greek Revival mansion in Roswell, Georgia, built in 1839–1840 by enslaved African Americans. It is one of several antebellum houses in the city and was listed on the National Register of Historic Places in 1971. This is where Martha Bulloch Roosevelt ("Mittie"), mother of Theodore Roosevelt, 26th U.S. president, lived as a child. It is also where she married Theodore Roosevelt's father, Theodore Roosevelt, Sr. Roosevelt himself visited the house in 1905. The descendants of Theodore Roosevelt and his three siblings, Anna, Elliott, and Corinne, are therefore descendants of Archibald Bulloch, the first governor of Georgia (1730–1777). It is now a historic house museum owned by the city of Roswell.

== History ==
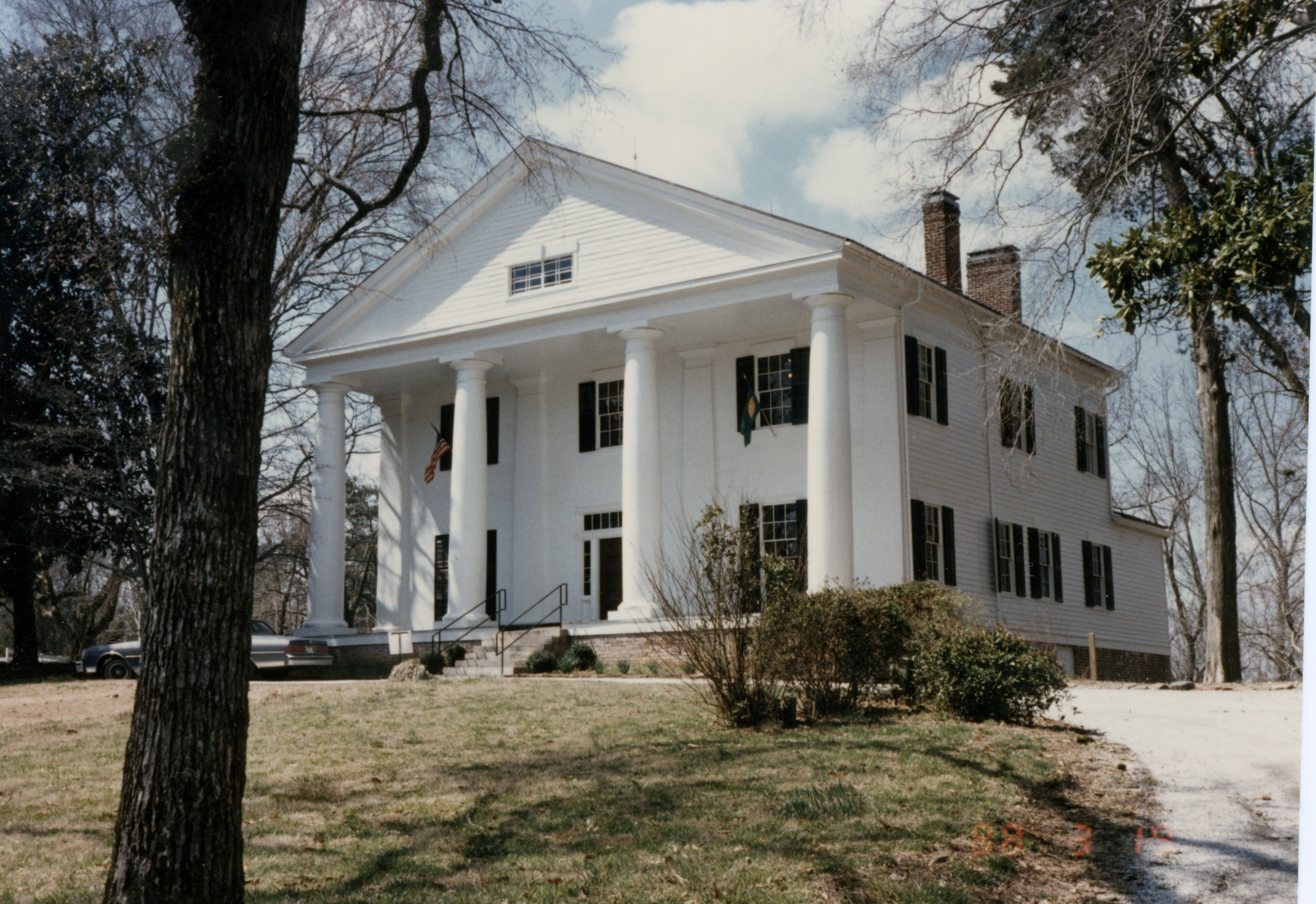
Bulloch Hall in 1988

The antebellum mansion was built by Mittie's father, Major James Stephens Bulloch. He was a planter from the Georgia coast, invited to the new settlement by his friend Roswell King. After the death of his first wife, Hester Amarintha "Hettie" Elliott (mother of his son James D. Bulloch), Bulloch married the widow of his first wife's father, Martha "Patsy" Stewart Elliott, and had four more children:

- Anna Bulloch
- Martha Bulloch
- Charles Bulloch (who died young)
- Irvine Bulloch.

Major Bulloch received a ten-acre plot in the new town and, with the craftsman-architect Willis Ball, designed and built the Greek Revival house. The family moved in during 1839; the National Register nomination dates the house's completion to about 1840.

Bulloch Hall was built by enslaved African Americans, and the Bulloch family held people in slavery to work the surrounding cotton land and the household. A list of 33 enslaved people associated with the house survives; those who worked inside it included the cook, known as Maum Rose, the housekeeper Maum Charlotte, and Daddy Luke. William Jackson, the coachman and butler, was known as Daddy William, and Grace Robinson, the children's nursemaid, as Maum Grace.

== Birth and marriage of Martha Bulloch ==
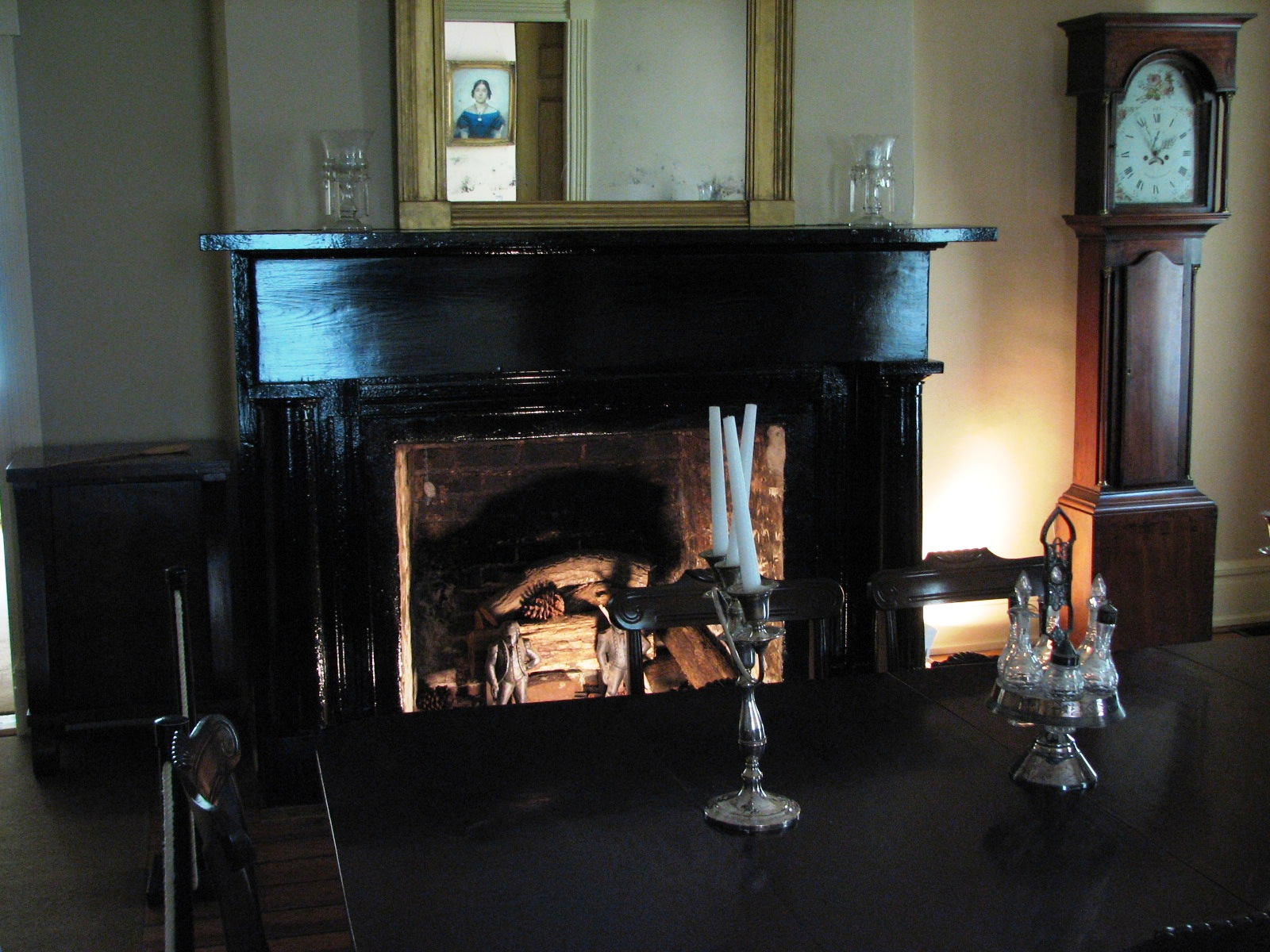
Fireplace mantle in the dining room, where Mittie and Theodore Roosevelt, Sr. (known as Thee) were married in front of the pocket doors on December 22, 1853

Martha Bulloch was born on July 8, 1835, in Hartford, Connecticut, and was raised at Bulloch Hall; she was known as Mittie.

The date of their first meeting is unclear. When Theodore Roosevelt, Sr. was 19, he came to Roswell, Georgia, with his friend Hilborne West, who was to marry Mittie's oldest half sister, Susan Elliott. Mittie was 15 at the time. "Thee," as he was called, met Mittie again when she went to Philadelphia in January 1853 to stay with her sister Susan. They fell in love and began planning their wedding through letters between Mittie in Roswell and Thee in New York. They were married in the dining room of Bulloch Hall on December 22, 1853. A bridesmaid, Eva King Baker, later recalled the wedding in an interview with Margaret Mitchell, author of Gone with the Wind, published in the Atlanta Journal in 1923.

After the marriage, the couple moved to New York City. The couple lived with Thee's parents while a house, a wedding gift from them, was constructed at 28 E 20th Street. In 1856, Martha, Anna, and Irvine moved to Philadelphia to live with Martha's daughter Susan West. Anna and Martha later moved in with Mittie and Thee in New York. The Roosevelt couple became the parents of Anna; Theodore Roosevelt, the 26th President of the United States; Elliott, and Corinne. Later Elliott married Anna Rebecca Hall, and his daughter was First Lady of the United States, Eleanor Roosevelt.

== President Roosevelt's visit in 1905 ==
Theodore Roosevelt visiting Bulloch Hall north of Atlanta, Georgia in 1905

Theodore Roosevelt visited Bulloch Hall while touring the South in 1905, some years after he had been criticized in the South for inviting Booker T. Washington to dine at the White House.

President Roosevelt and his wife Edith arrived in Roswell, Georgia on October 20, 1905. At Bulloch Hall, he spoke as follows:

It has been my very great good fortune to have the right to claim my blood is half Southern and half Northern, and I would deny the right of any man here to feel a greater pride in the deeds of every Southerner than I feel. Of all the children, the brothers and sisters of my mother who were born and brought up in that house on the hill there, my two uncles afterward entered the Confederate service and served with the Confederate Navy.

One, the younger man, served on the Alabama as the youngest officer aboard her. He was captain of one of her broadside 32-pounders in her final fight, and when at the very end the Alabama was sinking and the Kearsarge passed under her stern and came up along the side that had not been engaged hitherto, my uncle, Irvine Bulloch, shifted his gun from one side to the other and fired the two last shots fired from the Alabama. James Dunwoody Bulloch was an admiral in the Confederate service. (Note: James Dunwoody Bulloch was in fact the Confederacy's chief naval agent in Britain, who arranged the building of the Alabama; he did not hold the rank of admiral.) ...

Men and women, don't you think I have the ancestral right to claim a proud kinship with those who showed their devotion to duty as they saw the duty, whether they wore the grey or whether they wore the blue? All Americans who are worthy the name feel an equal pride in the valor of those who fought on one side or the other, provided only that each did with all his strength and soul and mind his duty as it was given to him to see his duty.

Eleanor Roosevelt visited Bulloch Hall several times.

== Historic designation ==
It was listed on the National Register of Historic Places individually, and also as a contributing building in the Roswell Historic District.

== In popular culture ==
Bulloch Hall provided the model for the cover illustration of William Harben's 1907 novel Mam' Linda.

== See also ==
- Archibald Smith Plantation Home
- Barrington Hall (Roswell, Georgia)
- Mimosa Hall (Roswell, Georgia)
- Theodore Roosevelt Birthplace National Historic Site
- List of plantations in Georgia (U.S. state)
