= Northwest Marietta Historic District =

Historic district in Georgia, United States

- U.S. National Register of Historic Places
- U.S. Historic district
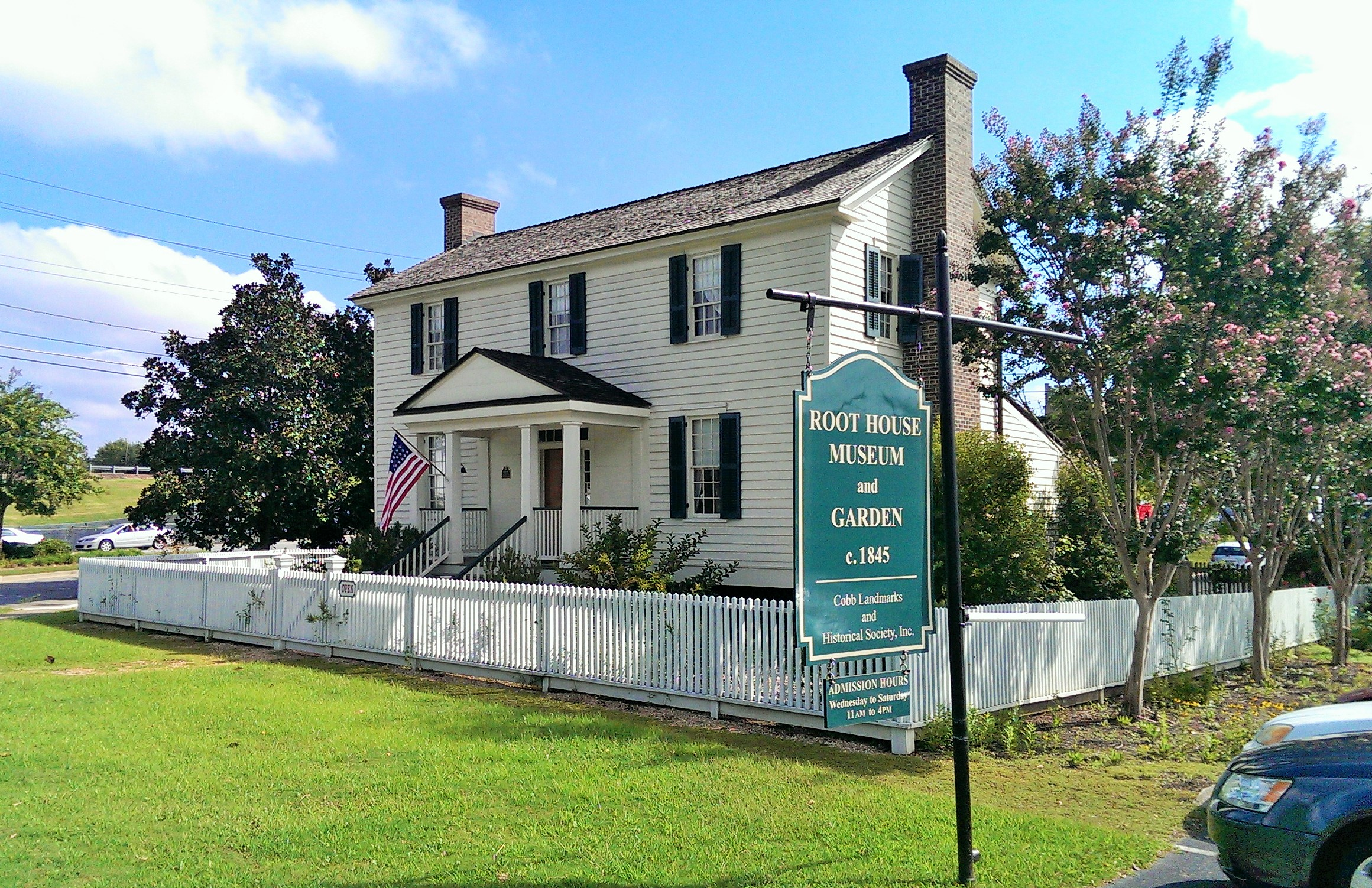
- Root House

- Location within Metro Atlanta Location within Georgia Location within the United States
- Location: Roughly bounded by RR tracks, NW along Kennesaw Ave., McDonald St., and Whitlock Ave., Marietta, Georgia
- Coordinates: 33.955886°N 84.550200°W
- Area: 230 acres (0.93 km^{2})
- Architectural style: Late Victorian, Greek Revival, Plantation Plain
- NRHP reference No.: 75000586
- Added to NRHP: June 11, 1975

The Northwest Marietta Historic District is a 230-acre (93 ha) historic district in Marietta, Georgia that was listed on the National Register of Historic Places in 1975. It includes Late Victorian, Greek Revival, Plantation Plain, and other architecture. The district includes an area in downtown Marietta, with the southernmost point being south of Whitlock Avenue on McDonald Street, and runs out Kennesaw Avenue to Noses Creek (just past St. Anne's Rd.) in the northwest.

== Notable buildings ==
Notable buildings in the district include:

- Kennesaw House (c.1845), 21 Depot St., a hotel on the L&N railway. In 1862 this was the Fletcher House hotel where Andrews' Raiders stayed the night before commandeering The General and setting off the Great Locomotive Chase. It later became a Confederate hospital, then was occupied by Union soldiers until it partially burned, then was returned to use as a hotel. (#16 of accompanying photos)
- NC & StL Passenger Depot (1898), Depot Street (#14)
- Brumby Chair Factory, Church Street (Note: 167 Church Street, per NRHP doc; 67 Church Street per accompanying photos) (c. 1879), manufacturer of the "famous" Brumby rocker chair. (Note: It is misstated in the NRHP document that the Brumby Chair Factory is the northernmost building in the district; it is very far from that.) (#15 of accompanying photos)
- Nichols-Benson House, (c. 1850), Whitlock, with servants quarters
- Glover-Blair-Anderson House (c. 1851), 81 Whitlock Avenue (photo #4), with smoke house and servants quarters, "unquestionably one of the finest antebellum structures in Marietta. This two-story brick stuccoed structure has a hipped roof, heavy lintel window treatment and a simple one-story East Lake influenced porch. In the 1870s, as a result of a fire in the attic, the house was restored immediately after which resulted in the elaborate Victorian appearance."

The house was built for entrepreneur John Heyward Glover, who had built and sold the Greek Revival-style Glover-McLeod-Garrison House (1847-51), also in Marietta, Georgia. That other house was built and/or designed by Willis Ball.

- McLellan-Birney House, (c. 1870); Church Street at Kennesaw Avenue (photo #11) neo-classical. It was the childhood home of Alice McLellan Birney (1858 – 1907) American educator who co-founded the National Parent-Teacher Association in 1897.
- Rogers-Abbott-Fowler House (c. 1850), Church Street (at Kennesaw Avenue), Greek Revival with "a two gallery columned portico", unusual for Greek Revival in Georgia.
- McNeal-Hawkins-Hamrich House (c. 1895), 331 Church Street, N.W. (photo #12), neo-classical with "a [C]orinthian portico, full entablature and hip roof"
- Clarke Library Building (c. 1893), Church Street at Polk-Lemon Street, an Octagon style building (photo #10)
- Root House (c.1840), Lemon Street, behind the Clarke Library Building, "a modest Plain Plantation style house", separately listed on the NRHP in 2014
- Groves-Mims House, Polk Street, adjacent to Nutting-Law House (photo #3), "a cottage Greek Revival style with some unusual columns on two sides."
- The Law House, (c. 1872), 60 Polk Street at Locust (photo #13) "very Victorian" appearance derives from its mansard roof and jigsaw scroll work trim of its gabled dormers. Original home burned after the Battle of Kennesaw Mountain. Current house uses some of the original chimney's. Legend states the home is haunted. Currently on the Marietta Ghost Trolley Tour.
- King-Pratt House (c. 1880), 90 Polk Street, "a one-story frame Victorian cottage style with detailed trim work on the gabled roof."
- Gignilliat–Cheek–Griffin House, (c. 1840), 243 Kennesaw Avenue (photo #7), described as distinctive, "in the style of a mid 19th century, A. J. Downing-type early Victorian home", with gingerbread trim on eaves and veranda.
- Brumby–Wallace–Dennington House (c. 1883), 267 Kennesaw Avenue (photo #9) Victorian house with one-story porch on two sides, "has delicate detail on the gabled eaves and along the exterior cornice area"
- Brumby-Sibley-Corley House, 285 Kennesaw Avenue (photo #1), "impressive" mid-Victorian house built by James Remley Brumby, first owner of Brumby Chair Factory.
- Howell-Sessions-Hallman House (c. 1848), 303 Kennesaw Avenue (photo #6) is a monumental Greek Revival house with two-story portico and a four-room central hall plan. It served as a Union general's headquarters, and later as the Harwood Female Seminary
- "Tranquilla", or Hansell–Camp–Keller House (1849), 435 Kennesaw Avenue (photo #5), "superb" Greek Revival home of Gen. Andrew J. Hansell. Its classical design may have followed from work of Connecticut architect Willis Ball, who had recently designed houses in Roswell, Georgia Hansell also lived in Mimosa Hall, in Roswell, in what is now the NRHP-listed Roswell Historic District.
- "Fair Oaks", or Garden Center House (c. 1852), 505 Kennesaw Avenue (photo #8), "has an unusual design with a high and broad gabled front facade with a first floor classical style porch and the Victorian detail on the second floor."
- "Oakton", or Wilder-Ariderson-Goodman House (c. 1838), 581 Kennesaw Avenue, "is mid-Victorian in appearance, but was originally Greek Revival with single-story circular columns across the front porch."
