= Andrew Jackson Hansell =

American lawyer, and politician (1815–1881)

Andrew Jackson "A. J." Hansell (c. 1815 – April 25, 1881), was an American lawyer, businessman and politician in the state of Georgia. He served as an aide-de-camp for Gov. Joseph E. Brown, and colonel in Georgia during the American Civil War. He gained the nicknamed title of "General", which followed him through life, as a member of the staff of Joseph E. Brown.

== Early life ==
Andrew Jackson Hansell was born c. 1815. William Young Hansell was his father. His brother Augustus H. Hansell (born August 26, 1817), became a lawyer and superior court judge.

He married Caroline Clifford Shepard in 1841. Together they had 6 children.

== Career ==
Hansell moved to Roswell, Georgia and became prosperous as a business associate of Roswell King, he served as president of his industrial plant, Roswell Cotton Mills (later known as the Roswell Manufacturing Company) for many years.

Hansell built the Greek Revival home called Tranquilla, or the Hansell–Camp–Keller House (1849), at 435 Kennesaw Avenue, in Marietta, Georgia, in what is now the Northwest Marietta Historic District. Its classical design may have followed from work of architect Willis Ball, who had recently designed many houses in Roswell, Georgia The Hansell family occupied Tranquilla during 1849 until 1867, including during the American Civil War. The house was occupied by Union army officers during Sherman's March to the Sea, and was much damaged. His wife Mrs. Caroline Shepherd Hansell (1820–1891), refused to abandon Tranquilla, and prevented more damage from occurring.

Hansell served as an aide-de-camp working under Gov. Joseph E. Brown, and colonel in Georgia, during the American Civil War (1861–1865).

From 1869, he lived in Mimosa Hall in Roswell, Georgia, in what is now Roswell Historic District (Roswell, Georgia).

He was a trustee of the Georgia Military Institute.

He served as Representative and Georgia State Senator from Cobb County. He was elected in 1880 as the intendant of the city of Roswell.

== Death and legacy ==
He died of pneumonia on April 25, 1881, and his remains were buried in Marietta City Cemetery, in Marietta in Cobb County, Georgia.

Hansell Street in Marietta is named for his family. His great-grandson, Haywood S. Hansell, was an American general who organized strategic bombing in World War II.
