= Barrington Hall =

Barrington Hall may refer to:

- Barrington Hall, Essex
- Barrington Hall (Berkeley, California)
- Barrington Hall (Roswell, Georgia)
