= Senator Hansell =

Senator Hansell may refer to:

- Andrew Jackson Hansell (1815–1881), Georgia State Senate
- Bill Hansell (born 1945), Oregon State Senate
