= William B. Bulloch =

American politician (1777–1852)

William Bellinger Bulloch

United States Senator from Georgia
- In office April 8, 1813 – November 6, 1813
- Preceded by: William H. Crawford
- Succeeded by: William Wyatt Bibb

Member of the Georgia Senate

Member of the Georgia House of Representatives

Personal details
- Born: 1777 Savannah, Georgia, U.S.
- Died: May 6, 1852 (aged 74–75) Savannah, Georgia, U.S.
- Resting place: Laurel Grove Cemetery
- Party: Democratic-Republican

William Bellinger Bulloch (1777 – May 6, 1852) was an American Senator from Georgia.

== Biography ==
Bulloch was born in Savannah, Georgia, the youngest son of Archibald Bulloch, who died the same year. His brother, Archibald Jr., became a Justice of the Inferior Court. William was uncle to James Stephens Bulloch, granduncle to James Dunwoody Bulloch, Martha Bulloch Roosevelt, and Irvine Stephens Bulloch, great-granduncle to President Theodore Roosevelt, Jr. and Elliott Roosevelt, and great-great-granduncle to First Lady of the United States Eleanor Roosevelt.

He studied law and was admitted to the bar in Savannah in 1797. In 1804, he was appointed United States district attorney. He was elected as mayor of Savannah in 1812 and alderman in 1814.

During the War of 1812, he served in the Savannah Heavy Artillery, a militia unit charged with defending the Georgia coast.

After the war, he served in a series of political positions in Georgia: solicitor general of the State, collector of customs, Georgia House of Representatives and the Georgia Senate. He was appointed as a Democratic-Republican to the United States Senate to fill the vacancy left by the resignation of William H. Crawford and served from April 8, 1813, until November 6, 1813, when successor William Wyatt Bibb was elected.

Additionally, he was one of the founders of the State Bank of Georgia and served as its president from 1816 to 1843.

He owned a number of slaves. In 1830, he owned 7 slaves. In 1840, he owned 20 slaves. In 1850, he owned 44 slaves.

Bulloch died in Savannah in 1852 and was buried in Laurel Grove Cemetery in that same city.

Political offices
Preceded by John Williamson	Mayor of Savannah; 1809-1811	Succeeded by Thomas Mendenhall
Preceded by Thomas Mendenhall	Mayor of Savannah; 1811-1812	Succeeded by George Jones
U.S. Senate
Preceded by William H. Crawford	U.S. senator (Class 2) from Georgia; April 8, 1813–November 6, 1813; Served alongside: Charles Tait	Succeeded by William W. Bibb
