= Glover–McLeod–Garrison House =

- Glover-McLeod-Garrison House
- U.S. National Register of Historic Places
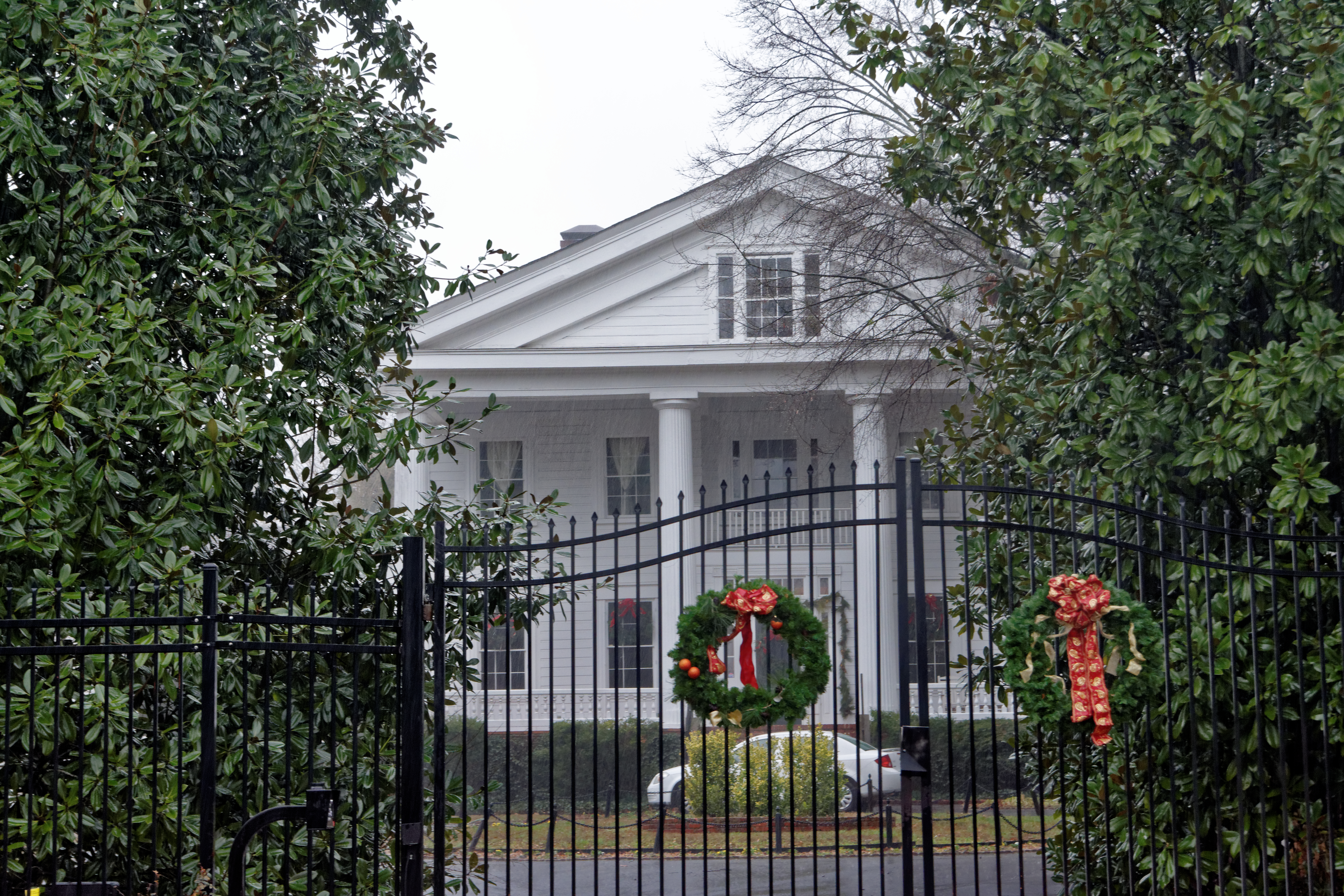

- Location within Georgia
- Location: 250 Garrison Rd., SE, Marietta, Georgia
- Coordinates: 33.93514°N 84.54785°W
- Area: 9 acres (3.6 ha)
- Built: 1847-51
- Built by: Willis Ball
- Architectural style: Greek Revival
- NRHP reference No.: 77000418
- Added to NRHP: March 25, 1977

The Glover–McLeod–Garrison House, in Marietta, Georgia, also known as Bushy Park and as Rocking Chair Hill, is a Greek Revival-style house which was built in 1847–1851. It is listed on the National Register of Historic Places (NRHP) since 1977.

== History ==
The Glover–McLeod–Garrison House was built and/or designed by architect Willis Ball. It was built for entrepreneur John Heyward Glover, who sold it in 1851 and went on to build the Glover-Blair-Anderson House (c.1851) also in Marietta, said to be "one of the finest antebellum structures in Marietta", and also NRHP-listed as part of the Northwest Marietta Historic District.

It was vacant from 1931 to 1939, then purchased and restored.

It was listed on the National Register in 1977. It was listed with address 250 Garrison Road, SE, but that part of the street is called Magnolia Chase Drive, as of 2017.
