= Primrose Cottage =

Historic house in Georgia, United States

- U.S. Historic district – Contributing property
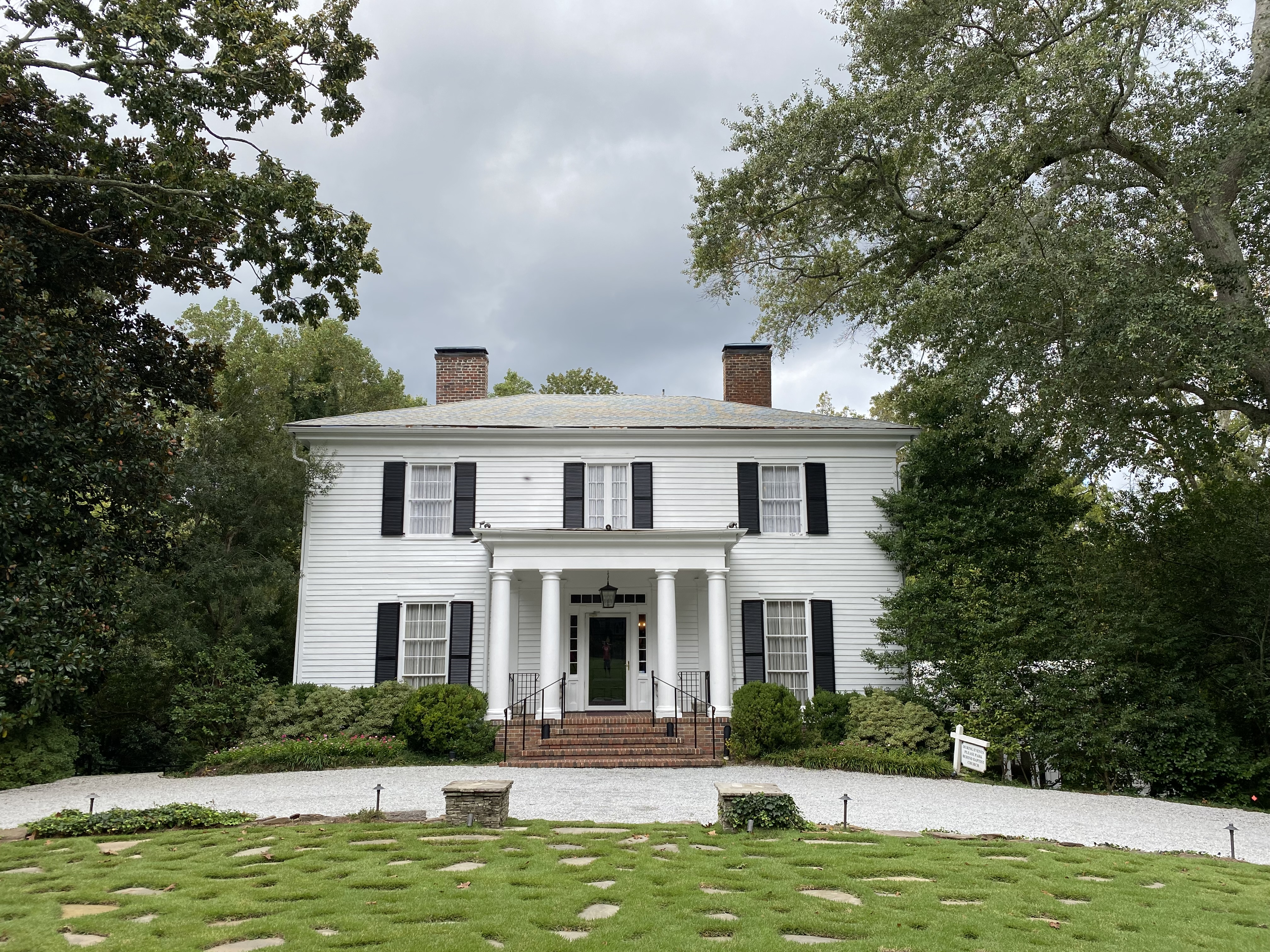
- Primrose Cottage, October 2021

- Location within Georgia
- Location: Roswell, Georgia
- Coordinates: 34.01701°N 84.36441°W
- Built: 1839
- Built by: Willis Ball
- Architect: Willis Ball
- Part of: Roswell Historic District (ID74000682)
- Designated CP: May 2, 1974

Primrose Cottage is a historic residence in Roswell, Georgia. It was the first permanent private home in Roswell. The house was completed in 1839 for Roswell King's recently widowed daughter, Eliza King Hand, and her children. Roswell King also moved into the house with his daughter's family.

As of 2023, the house functions as an events' facility.

It is listed on the National Register of Historic Places as a contributing building in the Roswell Historic District.

Willis Ball designed and/or built it. He also designed or built at least three other properties in Roswell Historic District, including the Roswell Presbyterian Church.

The home was purchased in 1853 by George H. Camp, Roswell’s first postmaster and successor to Barrington King as the president of the Roswell Manufacturing Company. Nap Rucker, a former major league pitcher with the Brooklyn Dodgers and the Mayor of Roswell in the 1930s, was also a resident.

== Cited sources ==
- Joe McTyre and Rebecca Hash Paden, Historic Roswell Georgia (Images of America), Arcadia Publishing, 2001, ISBN 0-7385-1374-1.
