= Martha Bulloch Roosevelt =

American socialite and mother of President Theodore Roosevelt

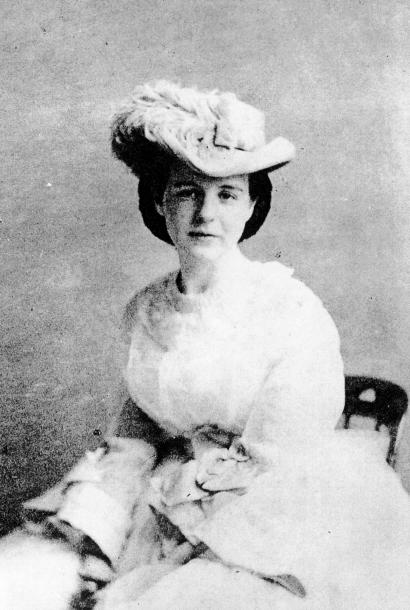
- Bulloch in 1857
- Born: Martha Stewart Bulloch; July 8, 1835; Hartford, Connecticut, U.S.
- Died: February 14, 1884 (aged 48); New York City, U.S.
- Occupation: Socialite
- Spouse: Theodore Roosevelt Sr. (m. 1853; died 1878)
- Children: Anna, Theodore Jr., Elliott, and Corinne
- Parent(s): James Stephens Bulloch; Martha Stewart
- Family: See Roosevelt family

Martha Stewart "Mittie" Roosevelt (née Bulloch; July 8, 1835 – February 14, 1884) was an American socialite. She was the mother of U.S. President Theodore Roosevelt and the paternal grandmother of Eleanor Roosevelt. She was a great-granddaughter of Archibald Bulloch, grandniece of William Bellinger Bulloch, and granddaughter of General Daniel Stewart. A true Southern belle raised in Georgia, Roosevelt is thought to have been one of the inspirations for Scarlett O'Hara.

== Childhood ==
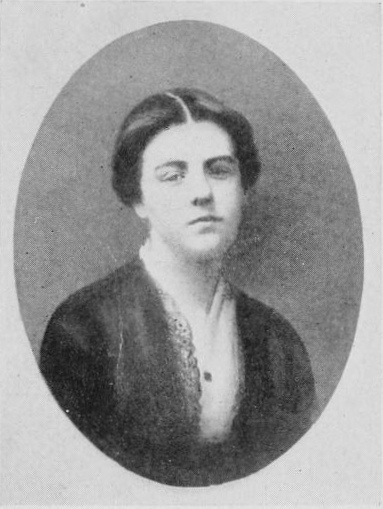
Mittie during her youth

Mittie was born in Hartford, Connecticut, on July 8, 1835, to Georgia residents Major James Stephens Bulloch (1793–1849) and Martha "Patsy" Stewart (1799–1864). She had an elder sister, Anna Louisa Bulloch (1833–1893), and two younger brothers, Charles Irvine Bulloch (1838–1841) and Civil War Confederate veteran Irvine Stephens Bulloch (1842–1898).

Through her father's first marriage to Hester Amarintha "Hettie" Elliott (1797–1831), she had two elder half brothers:

- John Elliott Bulloch (1818–1821)
- James Dunwoody Bulloch (1823–1901), Civil War Confederate veteran

Through her mother's first marriage to Senator John Elliott (father of Hettie), she also had four elder half siblings:

- Susan Ann Elliott (1820–1905)
- Georgia Amanda Elliott (1822–1848)
- Charles William Elliott (1824–1827)
- Daniel Stewart "Stuart" Elliott (1826–1861), who died of tuberculosis while serving in the Confederate Army during the Civil War.

When Mittie was three, Major Bulloch moved the family from Savannah, Georgia, to Cobb County in north Georgia and the new village that would become Roswell. It lies just north of the Chattahoochee River and the city of Atlanta, and Major Bulloch had gone there to become a partner in a new cotton mill with Roswell King, the town's founder. Bulloch had a mansion built, and, soon after it was completed in 1839, the family moved into Bulloch Hall. As a significant antebellum structure, it has been listed on the National Register of Historic Places.

The Bullochs were a wealthy planter family, members of the Georgia elite. In 1850, they held 31 African-American slaves, most of whom worked in their cotton fields. Others were assigned to such domestic tasks as cooking, sewing and related work. Recent research in Bulloch records identified 33 enslaved black people who were owned by the family. They have been commemorated on a plaque on the mansion grounds.

Like all of her siblings, Mittie was assigned an enslaved child - Lavinia - to act as her personal "shadow". Lavinia acted as Mittie's companion and went everywhere with her; stopping outside the classroom when Mittie went inside and sleeping on a mat by her side at night.

Mittie was a student at the South Carolina Female Collegiate Institute in Columbia, South Carolina.

After Major Bulloch's death in 1849, the family's fortunes declined somewhat, but Mittie was given a grand wedding to Theodore Roosevelt Sr. in 1853. Later, as was expected of young Southern gentlemen, Mittie's brothers Irvine and James fought in the Civil War as Confederate officers. They both lived in England after the war. Her half brother, Daniel Elliott, died early in the war from tuberculosis. It is believed by some that the character of Scarlett O'Hara, in Margaret Mitchell's novel, Gone With the Wind, was based partly on Mittie. Mitchell had, in fact, interviewed Mittie's closest childhood friend and bridesmaid, Evelyn King, for a story in the Atlanta Journal newspaper in the early 1920s. During that interview, Mittie's beauty, charm and fun-loving nature were described in detail.

== Marriage to Theodore Roosevelt Sr. ==
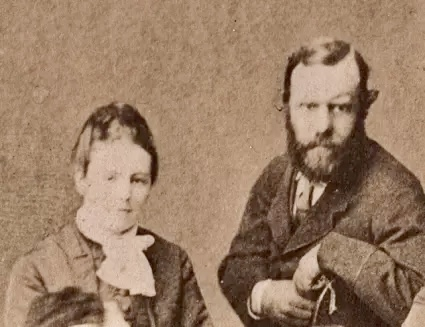
Mittie with her husband, Theodore, around 1872

Mittie married Theodore Roosevelt Sr. on December 22, 1853, at the Greek Revival-style family mansion Bulloch Hall in Roswell; they were wedded in front of the pocket doors in the formal dining room.

After their honeymoon, the couple moved into their new home at 28 East 20th Street, New York, a wedding present from C.V.S. Roosevelt. Each of C.V.S.'s elder sons lived near his own house at 14th Street and Broadway in Union Square. Shortly afterward, her mother, Patsy, and sister, Anna Bulloch, moved north to join Theodore and Mittie in New York.

Mittie bore four children:

- Anna "Bamie/Bye" Roosevelt (1855–1931)
- Theodore "T.R." Roosevelt Jr. (1858–1919)
- Elliott Roosevelt (1860–1894)
- Corinne Roosevelt (1861–1933)

== Life after Roswell ==
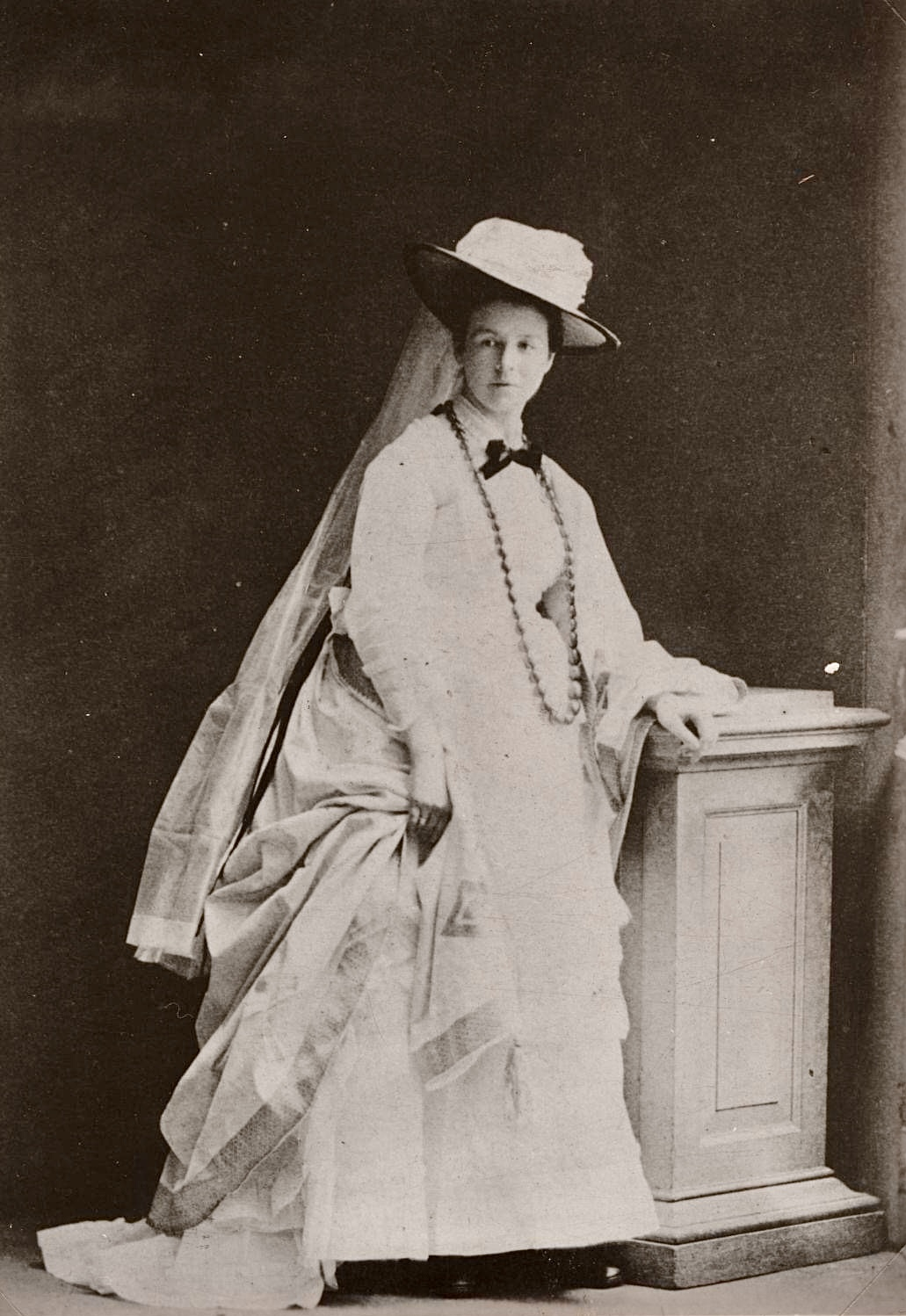
Martha Bulloch Roosevelt in the 1870s

During the war, Mittie was terrified for her brothers, Irvine and James. Irvine was the youngest officer on the CSS Alabama, firing the last gun before the ship sank in battle off the coast of Cherbourg, France, while James was a Confederate agent in England, Scotland and Wales. These emotional crises were mitigated somewhat by the maturity and management skills of Mittie's elder daughter, Bamie, who stepped into a leadership role at a young age, especially when her father, nicknamed "Thee", was out of town in Washington, visiting Lincoln and lobbying Congress for programs to support the Northern troops in the field and their families back home. "Thee", a Northerner himself, left his conflicted home situation to serve for the Union cause, acting as an Allotment Commissioner for New York and traveling to persuade soldiers to send a percentage of their wages to their families.

During her children's education, the family traveled to Europe, predominantly spending time in England, France, Switzerland, Italy, Austria and Germany from May 1869 to May 1870. They later went on an extended boat trip down the Nile, a trip through the Holy Land, and on to Vienna, Germany and France from October 1872 to November 1873. On this second tour, Theodore Sr. returned to America to go back to work and oversee the building of the new family home at Number 6 West 57th Street. The three youngest children stayed in Dresden, while Mittie and Bamie went to Paris and then the spa at Carlsbad so that Mittie could restore her health.

== Death ==
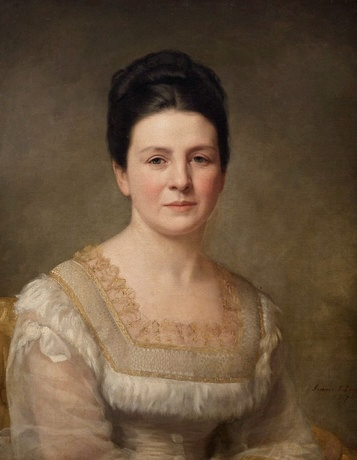
Martha Bulloch Portrait on display at her son Theodore Roosevelt's home Sagamore Hill on Long Island, New York and also in TR's Autobiography

Mittie Roosevelt died of typhoid fever in the early morning of February 14, 1884, aged 48. On the afternoon of the same day and in the same house, Theodore's first wife, Alice Lee Roosevelt, unexpectedly died of Bright's disease. Alice Lee Roosevelt and Mittie shared a joint funeral. Alice Roosevelt Longworth, Mittie's granddaughter, had been born two days earlier. Mittie is buried at Green-Wood Cemetery in Brooklyn, New York.

== Mittie described in her son's autobiography ==
In his autobiography published in 1913, her elder son Theodore described his mother with these words: "My mother, Martha Bulloch, was a sweet, gracious, beautiful Southern woman, a delightful companion and beloved by everybody. She was entirely 'unreconstructed' [i.e., sympathetic to the Southern Confederate cause] to the day of her death."

== Gallery ==
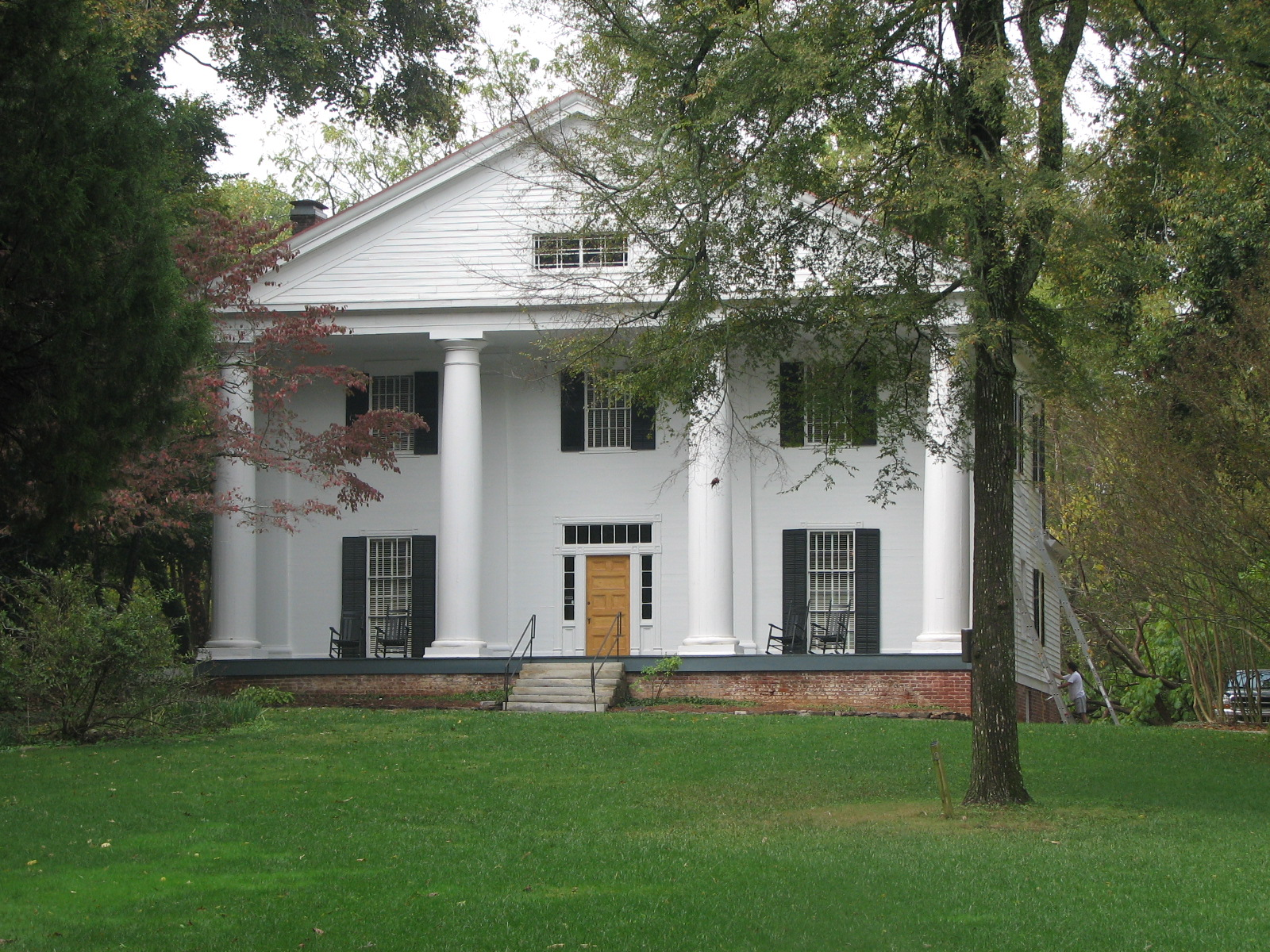
Bulloch Hall, the antebellum home of the South, is where Mittie grew up and was married.

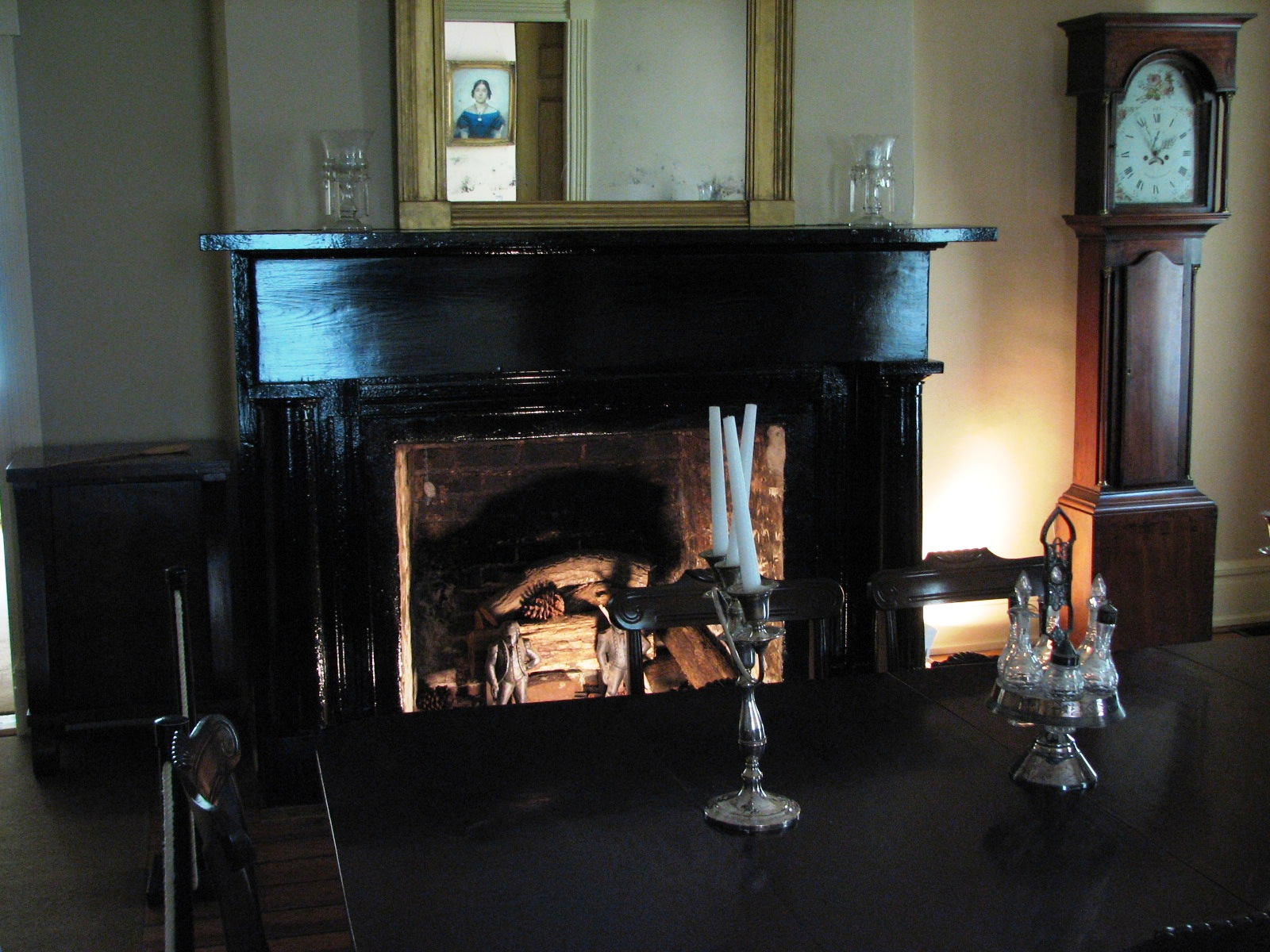
The fireplace mantle in the room where Theodore Roosevelt Sr. and Mittie Bulloch were married.

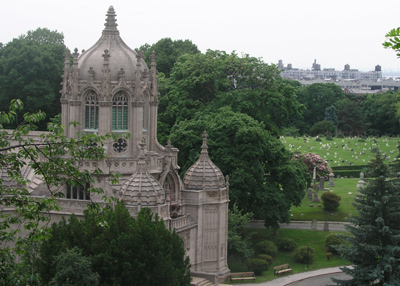
Chapel at Green-Wood Cemetery, in Brooklyn, where Mittie is buried.

== Sources ==
=== Primary sources ===
- Roosevelt, Theodore. An Autobiography. (1913)
- Huddleston, Connie M. and Gwendolyn I. Koehler. "Mittie & Thee: An 1853 Roosevelt Romance." (nonfiction) (2015)
- Huddleston, Connie M. and Gwendolyn I. Koehler. "Between the Wedding & the War: The Bulloch/Roosevelt Letters (1854–1860)" (2016)

=== Secondary sources ===
- Beale, Howard K. Theodore Roosevelt and the Rise of America to World Power (1956).
- Brands, H.W. Theodore Roosevelt (2001)
- Dalton, Kathleen. Theodore Roosevelt: A Strenuous Life. (2002)
- Harbaugh, William Henry. The Life and Times of Theodore Roosevelt. (1963)
- McCullough, David. Mornings on Horseback: The Story of an Extraordinary Family, a Vanished Way of Life, and the Unique Child Who Became Theodore Roosevelt (2001)
- Morris, Edmund The Rise of Theodore Roosevelt (1979)
- Morris, Edmund Theodore Rex. (2001)
- Mowry, George. The era of Theodore Roosevelt and the birth of modern America, 1900–1912. (1954)
