= Bullock =

Bullock may refer to:

== Animals ==
- Bullock (in British English), a castrated male bovine animal of any age
- Bullock (in American English), a young bull (an uncastrated male bovine animal)
- Bullock (in Australia, India and New Zealand), an ox, an adult male bovine used for draught (usually but not always castrated)

== Places ==
=== Canada ===
- Bullock Channel, a water channel in British Columbia, Canada
- Bullock Bluff, the northern point of Cortes Island, British Columbia, Canada
- Mount Bullock, a mountain in British Columbia, Canada

=== United States ===
- Bullock County, Alabama
  - Bullock Correctional Facility, a medium-security Alabama Department of Corrections prison
- Bullock, a community in the township of Lanark Highlands, Ontario, Canada
- Bullock, New Jersey, an unincorporated community
- Bullock, South Dakota, a ghost town
- Bullock Creek (South Carolina)

=== Elsewhere ===
- Bullock Harbour, near Dalkey, Ireland
- Bullock Park, a townland in County Tyrone, Northern Ireland

== Other uses ==
- Bullock (surname)
- Bullock Hotel, Deadwood, South Dakota
- Bullock Texas State History Museum, Austin, Texas
- Bullock's, a defunct department store chain based in Los Angeles, California

== See also ==
- Bullock Report (A Language for Life), a 1975 UK government report
- Bullock Report (Industrial democracy), a 1977 UK government report
- Bulloch
- Bollocks
