= Brumby Rocker =

Rocking chair

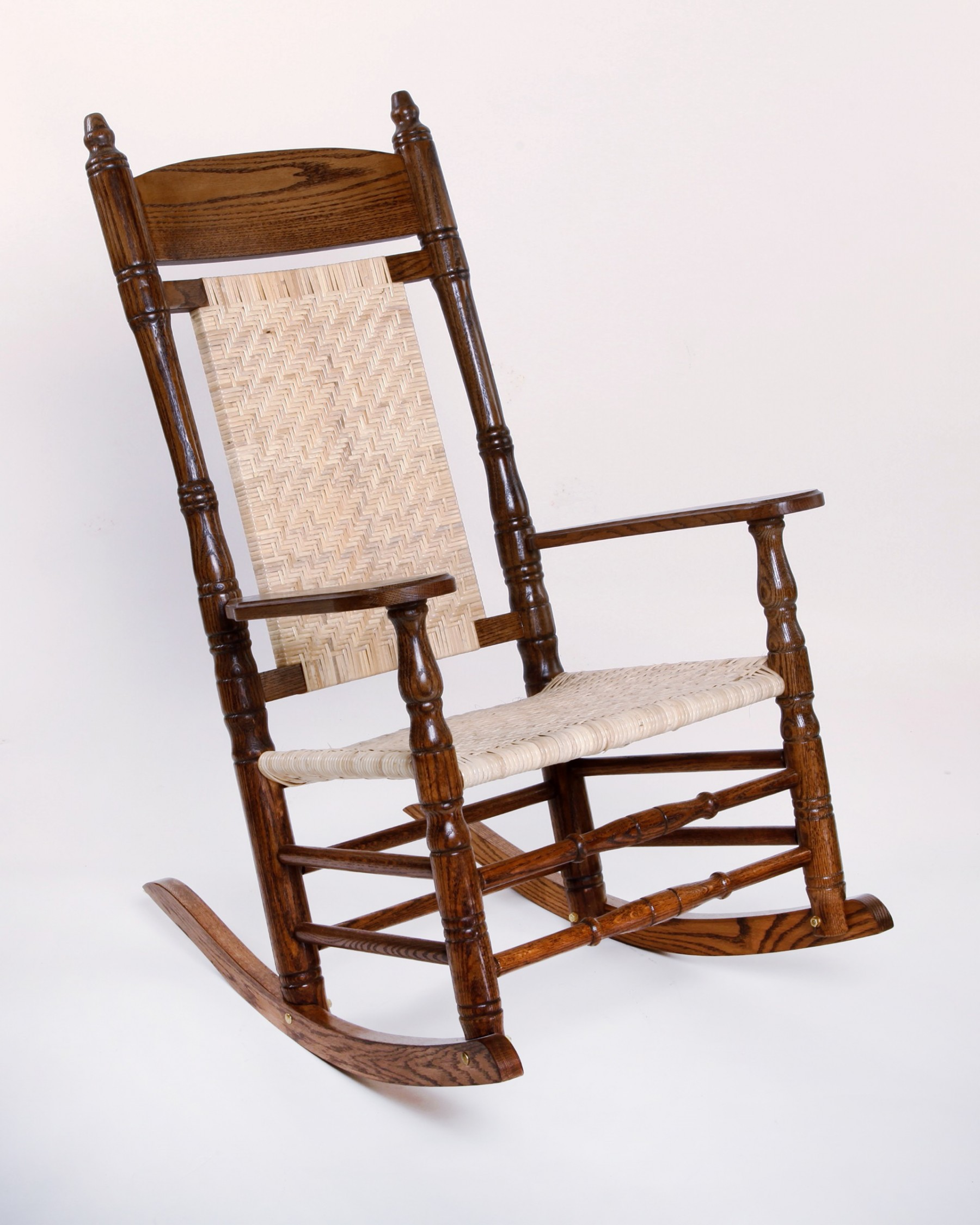
Brumby Rocker Chair

The Brumby Rocker is a type of rocking chair built by the Brumby Chair Factory of the Brumby Chair Company in Marietta, Georgia, which operated between 1875 and 1942, or by its successor which started in 1972. Former US president, Jimmy Carter was an admirer of the chairs and brought five Brumby rockers to the White House.

The chair is deliberately large, with large arms, seat and "runners" and a very high back. It has good balance, is sturdy, weighs approximately 32 pounds and stands 4 feet tall. It's made with a variety of materials including cane and red oak.

== History ==
James Remley Brumby was the first owner of the Brumby Chair Factory and production began in 1875. Production was stopped due to World War II in 1942, due to supply chain issues with bamboo cane. The factory was then used for other furniture.

The successor company started manufacturing in 1972.

== Buildings ==
The Brumby Chair Factory building (c. 1879), on Church Street (Note: 167 Church Street, per NRHP doc; 67 Church Street per accompanying photos) in Marietta, is a contributing building in the Northwest Marietta Historic District. The Brumby-Sibley-Corley House, at 285 Kennesaw Avenue in the district, is a mid-Victorian house built by James Remley Brumby (photo #1).
