= Roswell Historic District (Roswell, Georgia) =

Historic district in Georgia, United States

- U.S. National Register of Historic Places
- U.S. Historic district
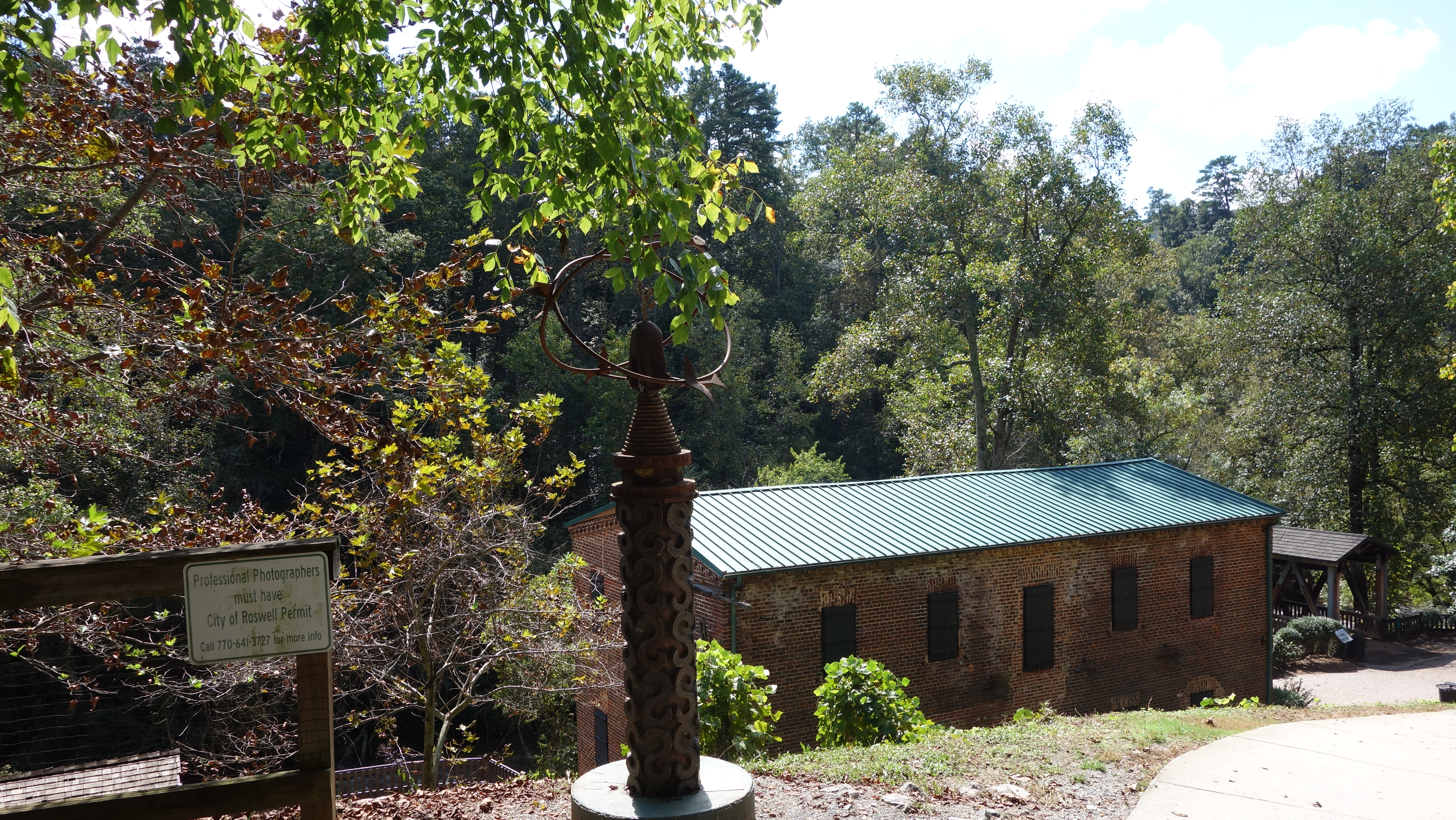
- The Roswell Mill
- Location: Roughly bounded by Big Creek, King and Dam Sts., SW along New Marietta Hwy., Roswell, Georgia
- Area: 120 acres (49 ha)
- Built: 1837-1900s
- Built by: Willis Ball
- Architect: Willis Ball
- Architectural style: Greek Revival, Late Georgian
- NRHP reference No.: 74000682
- Added to NRHP: May 2, 1974

The Roswell Historic District, in Roswell, Georgia in Fulton County. The district is a 120 acres (49 ha) area, roughly bounded by Big Creek, King and Dam Streets, and SW along New Marietta Hwy, in Roswell. It was listed on the National Register of Historic Places in 1974.

== History ==
Structures in the district date from as early as 1837. Willis Ball, from Connecticut, was builder and/or architect of four buildings listed: Primrose Cottage, Roswell Presbyterian Church, Bulloch Hall, and Barrington Hall. Bulloch Hall and Barrington Hall, both built in 1839, which were separately listed on the National Register in 1971. It includes Greek Revival architecture and Late Georgian architecture amongst its 28 contributing buildings and three contributing structures. Another contributing site is the Roswell town square.

== List of notable structures of the district ==
- Bulloch Hall (1839) (34.01529°N 84.36774°W)
- Barrington Hall (1839) (34.013322°N 84.36364°W)
- Roswell Town Square, described as "the Boston Common of this most southern of New England villages", which includes historic monuments (34.01485°N 84.36328°W)
- Mimosa Hall (1847), also known as Phoenix Hall, Greek Revival in style. On 2017 "Places in Peril" watchlist of Georgia Trust for Historic Preservation. It was built in 1840 for Roswell settler John Dunwoody, then rebuilt in 1847 after a fire. It was named Mimosa Hall by later owner General A. J. Hansell. It was eventually purchased in 1916 by noted Georgia architect Neel Reid who designed renovations of the house and its gardens. The house was purchased in 1947 by Granger Hansell, great-grandson of A. J. Hansell, and up to 2017 it had remained in the Hansell family. In 2017 it was for sale, and the Georgia Trust was concerned its acreage might be developed, and was offering inducements for a new owner to preserve the house and property. On June 12, 2017, the Roswell city council voted to purchase the property. The sale went through in August 2017, and there were later plans for the mansion to be retrofitted to become the "nation's oldest 'net zero' home". (34.01595°N 84.36583°W)

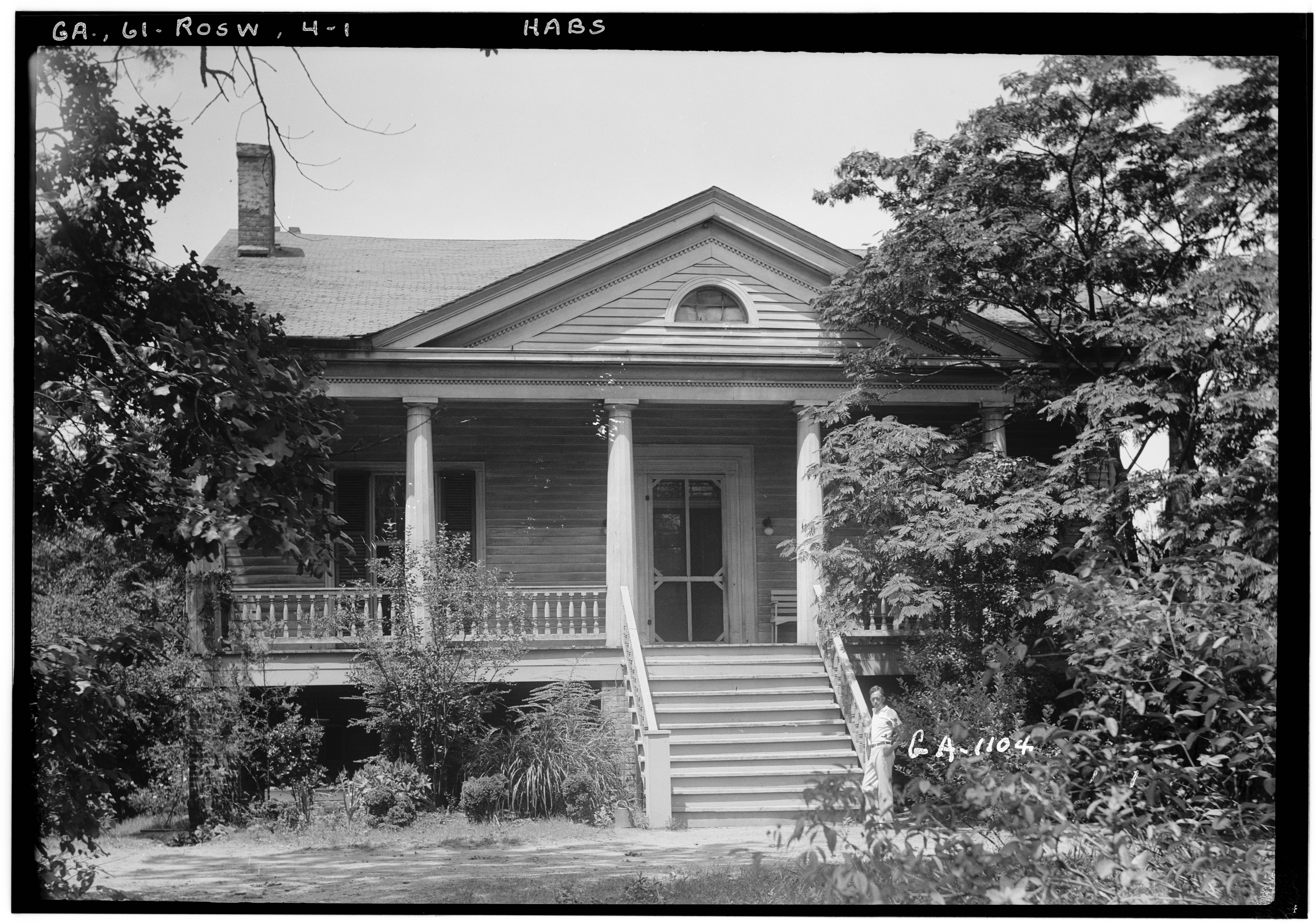
Holly Hill, aka Lewis Place, in 1936

- Holly Hill (built between 1842 and 1847). Raised Greek Revival house facing upon town square. Built c.1845. Holly Hill was built as a summer home for Savannah cotton broker Robert Adams Lewis and his wife, Catherine Barrington Cook. Also known as the Lewis Place, it was documented under that name by the Historic American Buildings Survey in 1936. (34.01572°N 84.36431°W)
- Primrose Cottage (c.1839), Mimosa Boulevard (34.01701°N 84.36441°W)
- various houses across from Primrose Cottage
- Great Oaks (1842), Mimosa Boulevard (34.01997°N 84.36405°W), now a wedding venue, "The Gardens at Great Oaks"

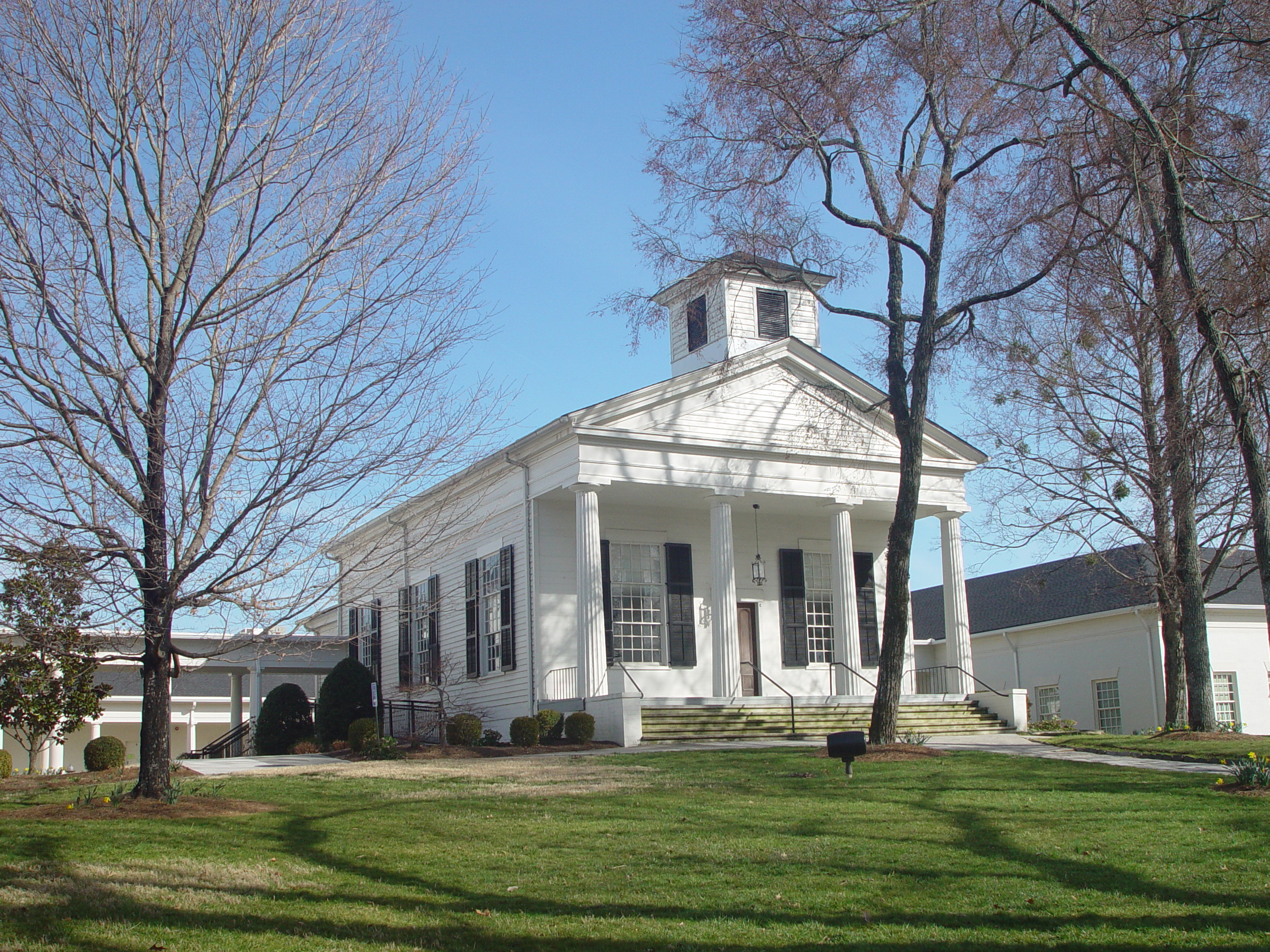
Roswell Old Presbyterian Church

- Roswell Presbyterian Church (1840). The church was organized at Primrose Cottage in 1839. (34.01879°N 84.36285°W)
- Roswell Presbyterian Church's cemetery (1841); about 300 feet (91 m) away from church, on east side of Atlanta St. (34.01932°N 84.36132°W)
- stores on Atlantic St. (34.01523°N 84.36271°W)

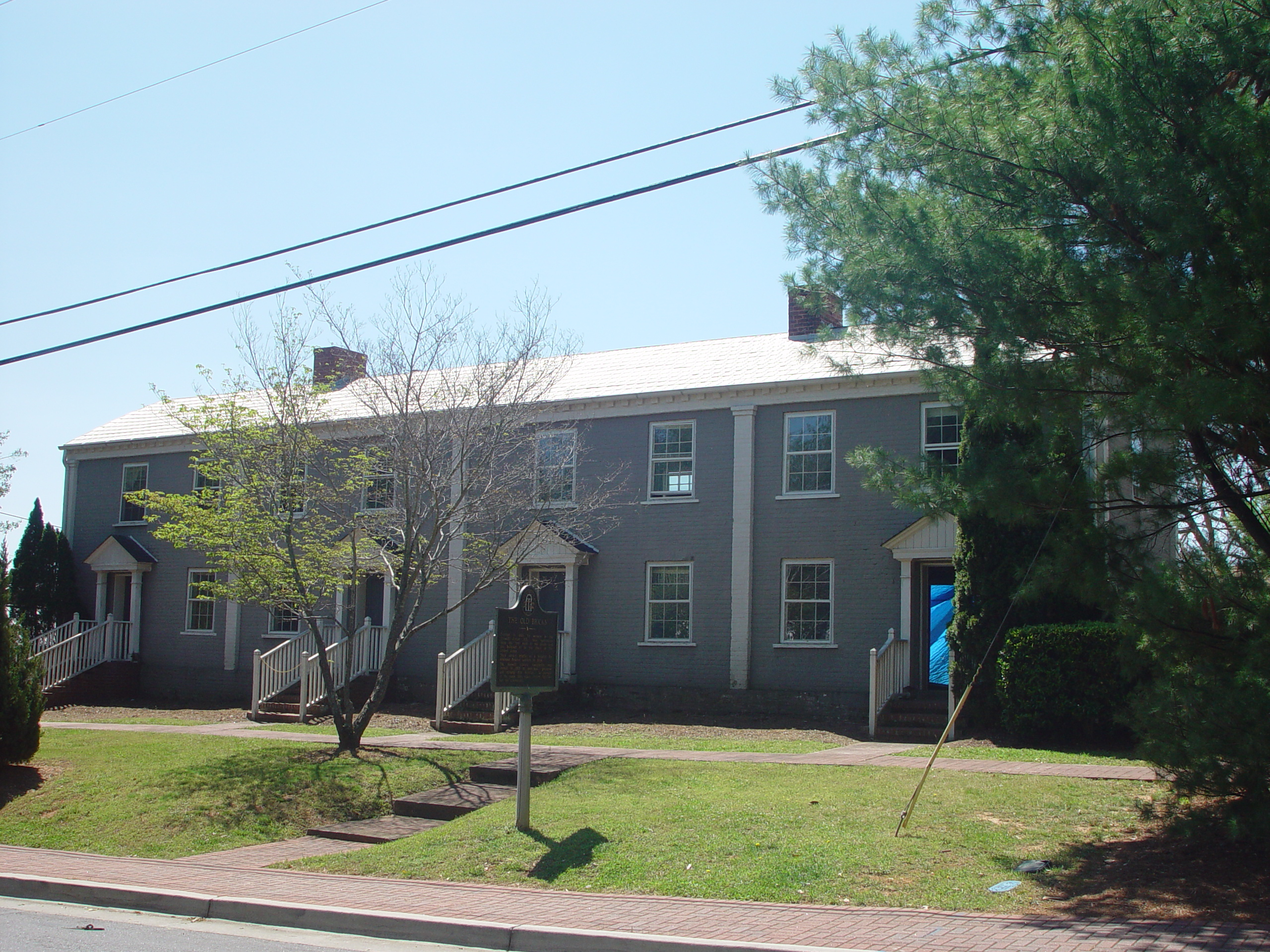
The Bricks

- The Old Bricks, originally housing for Roswell Mills workers (34.01515°N 84.36060°W)
- Southern Mills building (1882), Mill St. Per a sign on site, original mill destroyed by Sherman's men in 1864, rebuilt 1882, destroyed by lightning 1929, continued in operations to 1975. (34.01394°N 84.35989°W)
- Old Mill (c.1840), off Mill Street on Big Creek. Two-story brick building with brick cornice, late Georgian in style. This is "the last surviving physical remains of the original 1839 Roswell Manufacturing Company." (34.01338°N 84.35886°W) Now the "Old Mill Park and Machine Shop"

== See also ==
- National Register of Historic Places listings in Fulton County, Georgia
