= Mimosa Hall (Roswell, Georgia) =

Historic house in Georgia, United States

- U.S. Historic district – Contributing property
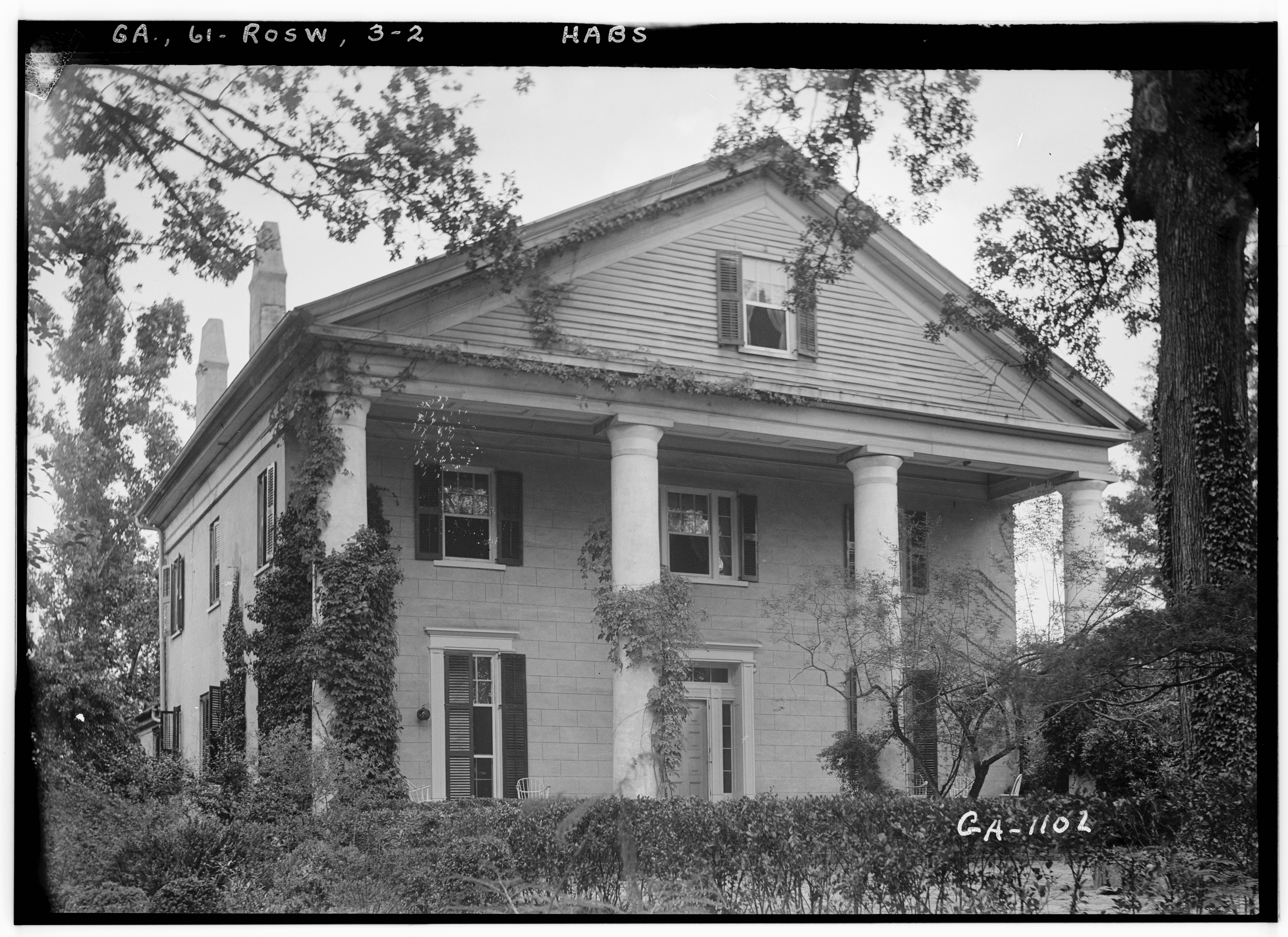
- HABS photo from 1936

- Location within Georgia Location within the United States
- Location: 127 Bulloch Avenue, Roswell, Georgia, U.S.
- Coordinates: 34.0160°N 84.3658°W
- Area: 9 acres (3.6 ha)
- Built: 1841
- Architect: Willis Ball
- Architectural style: Greek Revival
- Part of: Roswell Historic District (ID74000682)
- Designated CP: May 27, 1971

Mimosa Hall, originally named as Phoenix Hall, is a historic Greek Revival mansion located at 123 Bulloch Avenue in Roswell, Georgia, built in 1841. It is one of several historically significant buildings in the city, and is a contributing property of the Roswell Historic District on the National Register of Historic Places.

== History ==
The antebellum mansion sits on a nine-acre (3.6 ha) estate originally built in 1841 for John Dunwoody, one of the shareholders in the Roswell Manufacturing Company. It was designed by architect and builder Willis Ball. The site had previously hosted an earlier wooden house that had burned down, called Dunwoody Hall. It had been first named Phoenix Hall, before it was changed to Mimosa Hall. It was built using the labor of enslaved African Americans.

Andrew J. Hansell purchased the home in 1869, from George H. Camp and named the home after the mimosa trees on the property. Mrs. Barrington King, daughter-in-law of Roswell King, purchased the house in 1898.

Architect Neel Reid purchased the home in 1916, reconstituted the courtyard and gardens, designed the fieldstone driveway, converted the twin parlors into a large drawing room, and added modern plumbing, electricity and a furnace. Reid bought the front door from an old house on lower Fifth Avenue in New York City that was home to the first Bishop of New York and installed at Mimosa Hall. After Reid's death in 1926, his family retained ownership until 1937.

The house was purchased by Granger Hansell, great-grandson of Andrew J. Hansell, in 1947. In July 2016, the nine-acre (3.6 ha) estate was listed for sale with an asking price of $7,900,000 (~$10.1 million in 2024) and included a swimming pool, a 19th-century grist mill refashioned into a barn, and twenty-one acres (8.5 ha) of adjoining woods. The home and surrounding nine acres (3.6 ha) was listed at $3.85 million. The City of Roswell purchased the nine-acre (3.6 ha) Mimosa Hall property in 2017 for $2,950,000 from then-owner Sally Hansell utilizing financing from a 10-year Georgia Municipal Association installment loan. After purchasing the estate, the City spent $300,000 for structural analysis, tree assessments, fireplace repairs and a solar roof. The City opened the house in 2021 as a special events facility available for public rental.

An 1841 fire damaged the original wooden walls and brick was used to rebuild them in 1846. The home contains four bedrooms and four bathrooms and is 6,308 square feet in size The interior contains three rare panels painted in 1881. One of the panels depicts the Three Graces - Cupid, Psyche and Venus.

The estate grounds contain many different species of trees including Osage orange, deciduous oriental magnolia and yellowwood., with 14 of the original 15 gardens still intact with features including a cutting garden, a rose garden, a weeping tree garden, a sunken garden, and a reflecting pool and garden.

== See also ==
- List of National Historic Landmarks in Georgia
- National Register of Historic Places listings in Fulton County, Georgia
