= James Dunwoody Bulloch =

Confederate diplomat and spy during the American Civil War (1823–1901)

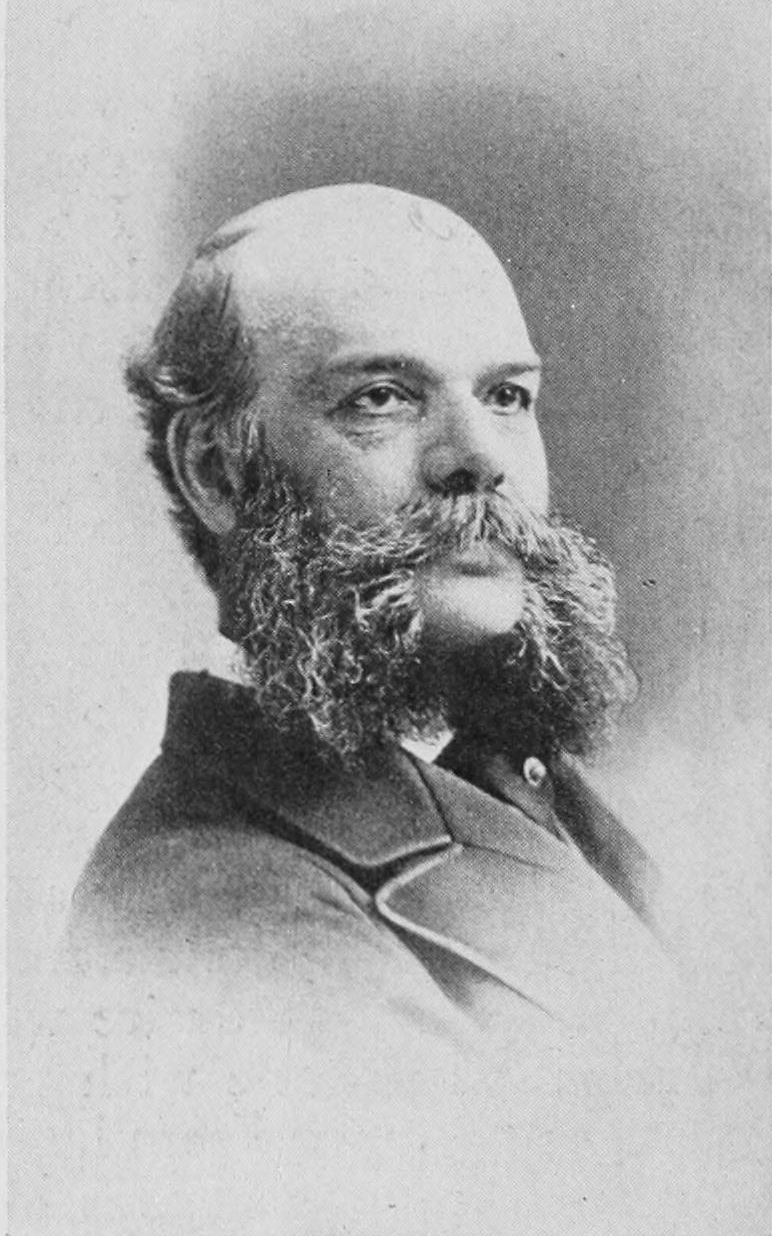
- Born: June 25, 1823; Savannah, Georgia
- Died: January 7, 1901 (aged 77); Liverpool, England
- Spouse(s): Elizabeth Euphemia Caskie (1851–1854); Harriott Cross Foster (1857–1901)
- Children: 5
- Relatives: James Stephens Bulloch (father); Irvine Bulloch (half-brother); Martha Bulloch Roosevelt (half-sister)
- Military career
- Allegiance: United States; Confederate States of America
- Branch: United States Navy; Confederate States Navy
- Service years: 1839–1854 USN; 1861–1865 CSN
- Rank: Commander (CSN)
- Commands: USS State of Georgia (1853)

James Dunwoody Bulloch (June 25, 1823 – January 7, 1901) was the Confederacy's chief foreign agent in Great Britain during the American Civil War. Based in Liverpool, he operated blockade runners and commerce raiders that provided the Confederacy with its only source of hard currency. Bulloch arranged for the purchase by British merchants of Confederate cotton, as well as the dispatch of armaments and other war supplies to the South. He also oversaw the construction and purchase of several ships designed at ruining Northern shipping during the Civil War, including CSS Florida, CSS Alabama, CSS Stonewall, and CSS Shenandoah. Due to his being a Confederate secret agent, Bulloch was not included in the general amnesty that came after the Civil War and therefore decided to stay in Liverpool, becoming the director of the Liverpool Nautical College and the Orphan Boys Asylum.

Bulloch's half-brother Irvine Bulloch was a Confederate naval officer and his half-sister Martha Roosevelt was the mother of U.S. President Theodore Roosevelt and paternal grandmother of First Lady Eleanor Roosevelt.

== Birth and early years ==
James D. Bulloch was born in 1823 on his family's plantation near Savannah, Georgia, to Major James Stephens Bulloch (son of Captain James Bulloch and Ann Irvine) and Hester Amarintha Elliott (daughter of Senator John Elliott and Esther Dunwoody). After Hester died, Major Bulloch enrolled his son in a private school in Hartford, Connecticut.

The elder Bulloch married again, to the widow Martha Stewart, in May 1832. She had been the second wife and widow of Senator John Elliott. James S. and Martha Bulloch had four children: Anna; Martha; Charles Irvine (who died young); and Irvine Stephens Bulloch.

In 1838, Major Bulloch moved his family from the Low Country to Cobb County, in the Piedmont. There he became a partner with Roswell King in a new cotton mill. In what would become Roswell, Georgia, he had a grand home built, made by the labor of free craftsmen and slave workers. When it was completed in 1839, the family moved into Bulloch Hall. However, son James D. Bulloch never lived there, as he had signed articles in the U.S. Navy by the time the new plantation mansion had finished construction.

James S. Bulloch kept a large amount of land in cotton cultivation. He died in 1849; Mrs. Bulloch still held 31 enslaved African-Americans in 1850, according to the census slave schedules.

== Marriage and family ==
James Dunwoody Bulloch married Elizabeth Caskie in 1851. After her early death, he married Mrs. Hariott Cross Foster, a widow, of Baton Rouge, Louisiana, in 1857. They had five children together.

== Naval service and European agent of Confederacy ==
James (left) with his younger half-brother, Irvine Bulloch, c. 1865

Bulloch served in the United States Navy for about fifteen years before resigning his commission in 1854 to join a private shipping company. When the Southern states seceded from the Union and the Civil War began in 1861, one of the Union's first acts was to create a naval blockade of Confederate ports to cut off commerce in the South.

In April 1861, while his ship was in New Orleans, Bulloch offered to assist the Confederate States of America. When he returned to New York, he found a letter from C.S.A. Attorney General Judah P. Benjamin accepting his offer and ordering him to Montgomery, Alabama, for his assignment. James D. Bulloch soon became a Confederate secret agent and their "most dangerous man" in Europe, according to Union State Department officials.

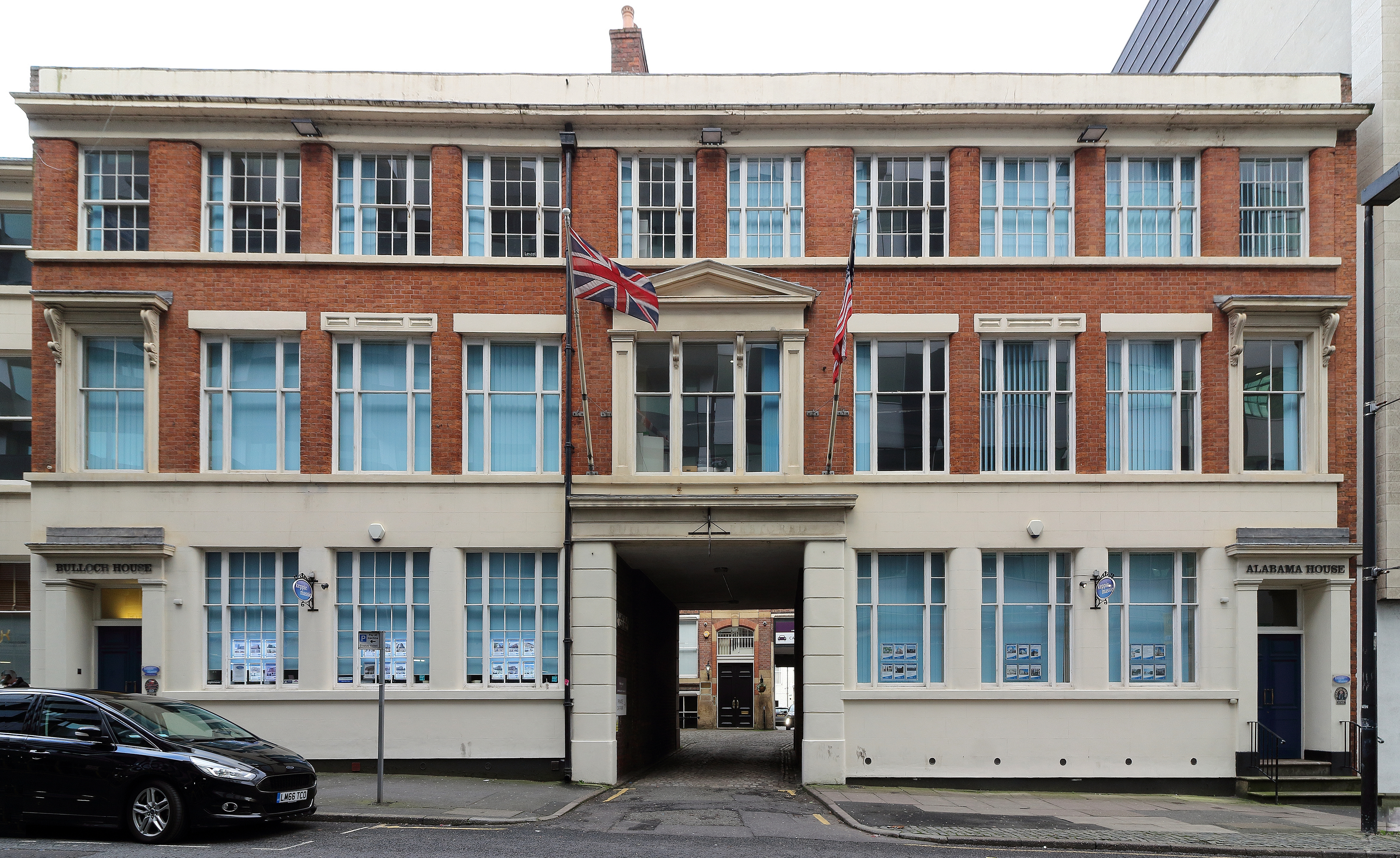
Former offices of Fraser, Trenholm & Co. in Rumford Place, Liverpool (photographed in 2019)

Less than two months after the attack on Fort Sumter, Bulloch arrived at Liverpool, England, and established a base of operations there. Britain was officially neutral in the conflict between North and South, but private and public sentiment was divided between the two belligerents. British merchants were also willing to buy all the cotton that could be smuggled past the Union blockade, which provided the South with its only real source of revenue. Bulloch established a relationship with the shipping firm of Fraser, Trenholm, & Company to buy and sell Confederate cotton; the company became, in effect, the Confederacy's international bankers. George Trenholm served as Treasurer of the Confederacy in the last year of the war.

Bulloch worked closely with Charles K. Prioleau who handled Confederacy funding in England and arranged for the construction and secret purchase of the commerce raider CSS Alabama. He arranged for cotton to be converted to hard currency, which he in turn used to purchase badly needed war materiel, including arms and ammunition, uniforms, and naval supplies. He also arranged for the construction of the CSS Florida; along with the Alabama, the ship preyed upon the Union's merchant fleet. James' younger half-brother, Irvine S. Bulloch, served in the Confederate States Navy on the Alabama.

Realizing that he needed a steady flow of funds to support the purchasing program as well as a way to ship materiel from England, Bulloch decided to buy a steamship, the SS Fingal, which was renamed the CSS Atlanta. He filled it with ordnance which he and an agent of the Southern War Department had accumulated and then sailed to America.

Bulloch later returned to Liverpool and continued his business relationship with Fraser, Trenholm & Co. He was involved in constructing and acquiring a number of other warships and blockade runners for the Confederacy, including the purchase of the Sea King, which was renamed the CSS Shenandoah. Bulloch instructed Confederate Navy Captain James Iredell Waddell to sail "into the seas and among the islands frequented by the great American whaling fleet, a source of abundant wealth to our enemies and a nursery for their seamen. It is hoped that you may be able to greatly damage and disperse that fleet." The CSS Shenandoah fired the last shots of the war on June 28, 1865, during a raid on American whalers in the Bering Sea.

== After the war ==
As Confederate secret agents, James and Irvine Bulloch were not included in the general amnesty that the federal government approved after the Civil War. They decided to stay in Liverpool, where they became quite successful as cotton importers and brokers.

During the 1880s, a young Theodore Roosevelt, known as T. R., persuaded his "Uncle Jimmie" Bulloch to write and publish an account of his activities during the Civil War. The Secret Service of the Confederate States in Europe was published in two volumes in 1883. T. R. wrote to his mother telling of his success with the project saying, "I have persuaded him [James Bulloch] to publish a work which only he possesses the materials to write." In return, Uncle Jimmie spent considerable time schooling his energetic nephew on the operations of wind-powered ships in the Age of Sail and explained much about ship-to-ship fighting tactics, as Theodore had no personal experience or training in early 19th-century naval warfare. Roosevelt drew from this tutoring, and his long hours spent in libraries researching the official records of the U.S. Navy, for his book The Naval War of 1812.

=== Theodore Roosevelt on the Bullochs ===
In 1905, the height of reconciliation between the North and the South, incumbent President Theodore Roosevelt toured the South. After spending October 19 in North Carolina and skipping South Carolina, Roosevelt visited Roswell, Georgia, the next day. He spoke to the citizens as his "neighbors and friends" and concluded his remarks as follows:

It has been my very great good fortune to have the right to claim my blood is half southern and half northern, and I would deny the right of any man here to feel a greater pride in the deeds of every southerner than I feel. Of all the children, the brothers and sisters of my mother who were born and brought up in that house on the hill there, my two uncles afterward entered the Confederate service and served with the Confederate Navy.

One, the younger man, served on the Alabama as the youngest officer aboard her. He was captain of one of her broadside 32-pounders in her final fight, and when at the very end the Alabama was sinking and the Kearsarge passed under her stern and came up along the side that had not been engaged hitherto, my uncle, Irvine Bulloch, shifted his gun from one side to the other and fired the two last shots fired from the Alabama. James Dunwoody Bulloch was a commander in the Confederate service.....

Men and women, don't you think I have the ancestral right to claim a proud kinship with those who showed their devotion to duty as they saw the duty, whether they wore the grey or whether they wore the blue? All Americans who are worthy the name feel an equal pride in the valor of those who fought on one side or the other, provided only that each did with all his strength and soul and mind his duty as it was given to him to see his duty.

In Roosevelt's autobiography, he mentions the Bullochs as follows:

My mother's two brothers, James Dunwoody Bulloch and Irvine Bulloch, came to visit us shortly after the close of the war. Both came under assumed names, as they were among the Confederates who were at that time exempted from the amnesty. "Uncle Jimmy" Bulloch was a dear old retired sea-captain, utterly unable to "get on" in the worldly sense of that phrase, as valiant and simple and upright a soul as ever lived, a veritable Colonel Newcome. He was a commander in the Confederate navy, and was the builder of the famous Confederate war vessel Alabama. My uncle Irvine Bulloch was a midshipman on the Alabama, and fired the last gun discharged from her batteries in the fight with the Kearsarge. Both of these uncles lived in Liverpool after the war. My uncle Jimmy Bulloch was forgiving and just in reference to the Union forces, and could discuss all phases of the Civil War with entire fairness and generosity. But in English politics he promptly became a Tory of the most ultra-conservative school. Lincoln and Grant he could admire, but he would not listen to anything in favor of Mr. Gladstone. The only occasions on which I ever shook his faith in me were when I would venture meekly to suggest that some of the manifestly preposterous falsehoods about Mr. Gladstone could not be true. My uncle was one of the best men I have ever known, and when I have sometimes been tempted to wonder how good people can believe of me the unjust and impossible things they do believe, I have consoled myself by thinking of Uncle Jimmy Bulloch's perfectly sincere conviction that Gladstone was a man of quite exceptional and nameless infamy in both public and private life.

== Later years ==
James died, aged 77, in Liverpool, England, at the 76 Canning Street home of his daughter and son-in-law. His headstone in Liverpool's Toxteth Park Cemetery bears the inscription: "An American by birth, an Englishman by choice".
