= Willis Ball =

American architect

- Born: c. 1800; Connecticut, U.S.
- Died: Date of death unknown
- Occupations: Architect, builder

Willis Ball (born c. 1800 – date of death unknown) was an American architect and builder. He was active in Georgia state in the late 1830s to 1850s, and was originally from Windsor, Connecticut.

== Life and career ==
Willis designed homes for family members of Roswell King, a businessman and planter also from Windsor, Connecticut, who founded the city of Roswell, Georgia.

Several homes he designed are listed on the National Register of Historic Places, including Barrington Hall (1839) in Roswell, Georgia, for Roswell King's son Barrington King; the Primrose Cottage (1839) in Roswell, Georgia, for Roswell King's widowed daughter Eliza King Hand; and the Roswell Presbyterian Church (1839); the two latter are also within the Roswell Historic District. Additionally he designed the Glover–McLeod–Garrison House (c. 1847) in Marietta, Georgia; and the Howell–Sessions–Hallman House (c. 1848) in Marietta; both of which are within the Northwest Marietta Historic District.

== Work ==
- Barrington Hall (Roswell, Georgia) (1839)
- Bulloch Hall (1839) in Roswell, Georgia
- Primrose Cottage (1839) in Roswell, Georgia
- Roswell Presbyterian Church (1839) in Roswell, Georgia
- Mimosa Hall (1847) in Roswell, Georgia
- Glover–McLeod–Garrison House (c. 1847) in Marietta, Georgia
- Howell–Sessions–Hallman House (c. 1848) in Marietta, Georgia
- Archibald Howell Home (c. 1840s) in Marietta, Georgia
