= James Stephens Bulloch =

American planter (1793–1849)

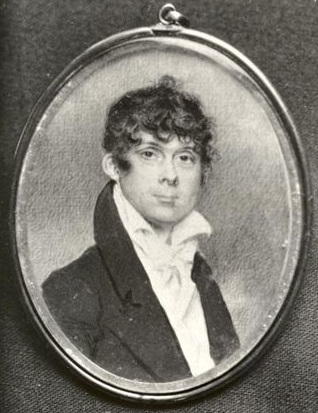
- Born: 1793; Savannah, Georgia, U.S.
- Died: February 18, 1849 (aged 55–56); Roswell, Georgia, U.S.
- Occupation: Planter
- Spouses: Hester Amarintha Elliott (m. 1817; died 1831) Martha Stewart (m. 1832)
- Children: John Elliott Bulloch; James Dunwoody Bulloch; Anna Louisa Bulloch; Martha Bulloch; Charles Irvine Bulloch; Irvine Stephens Bulloch
- Parent(s): James Bulloch II; Ann Irvine
- Relatives: Archibald Bulloch (grandfather); William Bellinger Bulloch (uncle); Anna Roosevelt (granddaughter); Theodore Roosevelt, Jr. (grandson); Elliott Bulloch Roosevelt (grandson); Corinne Roosevelt (granddaughter)

James Stephens Bulloch (1793 – February 18, 1849) was a planter and early settler of Georgia. He was a grandson of Georgia governor Archibald Bulloch and a nephew of Senator William Bellinger Bulloch. He was also the maternal grandfather of President Theodore Roosevelt and a great-grandfather of First Lady Eleanor Roosevelt.

== Life and career ==
James Stephens Bulloch was born in Savannah, Georgia, to a planter family. His parents were Ann (née Irvine) Bulloch and Captain James Bulloch II. He had an elder brother, John Irvine Bulloch, and two younger sisters, Jane and Ann Bulloch.

He was educated to become a planter and learned about managing crops and working with overseers to deal with slave labor.

=== Cotton mills and development of Roswell ===
Bulloch moved his family from Savannah in 1838 to north Georgia to partner with Roswell King in establishing a cotton mill in the piedmont near the fall line. They used water power for their mills. There in what developed as the town of Roswell, Bulloch built Bulloch Hall, a plantation house, in 1839 with the labor of African-American slaves and craftsman. Today, Bulloch Hall has been restored and is listed on the National Register of Historic Places.

Bulloch also developed a plantation in the uplands, where his workers cultivated and processed short-staple cotton, the chief commodity crop. This cotton had been made profitable by invention of the cotton gin, and was planted throughout the piedmont.

== Personal life ==
The younger James Bulloch first married Hester Amarintha "Hettie" Elliott (1797–1831), a daughter of Senator John Elliott and Esther Dunwoody, on December 31, 1817. Together, they had two sons:

- John Elliott Bulloch (1819–1821)
- James Dunwoody Bulloch (1823–1901)

After Hettie died, Major Bulloch married on May 8, 1832, Martha "Patsy" Stewart (1799–1864), the second wife and widow of Senator Elliott. James had previously courted Patsy in 1817 and proposed to her. She had declined the proposal and later married Senator Elliott. Patsy was the youngest daughter of General Daniel Stewart and Sarah Susannah (née Oswald) Stewart. Sarah's brother was Thomas Hepworth Oswald. Together, James and Patsy had four children, with the youngest two, Charles and Irvine, being born in Cobb County, Georgia after the family had moved from Savannah.):

- Anna Louisa Bulloch (1833–1893), who married James King Gracie (1840–1903)
- Martha "Mittie" Bulloch (1835–1884), who married Theodore "Thee" Roosevelt, Sr. (1831–1878).
- Charles Irvine Bulloch (1838–1841), who died young.
- Irvine Stephens Bulloch (1842–1898)

Bulloch died in 1849. According to the 1850 Slave Schedules, his widow Martha "Patsy" Stewart Elliott Bulloch still held 31 slaves to work their plantation.

=== Descendants ===
Through his daughter Martha, he was the maternal grandfather of Theodore Roosevelt, the future president, and Elliott Bulloch Roosevelt. He was also a great-grandfather of socialite Alice Lee Roosevelt and First Lady Eleanor Roosevelt (wife of President Franklin D. Roosevelt).
