= Irvine Bulloch =

Confederate Navy officer (1842–1898)

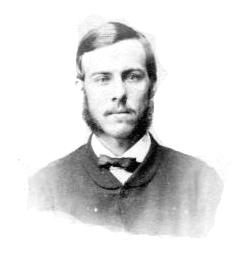
- Born: Irvine Stephens Bulloch; 25 June 1842; Roswell, Georgia
- Died: 14 July 1898 (aged 56); Liverpool, England
- Burial place: Toxteth Park Cemetery, Liverpool
- Relatives: James Stephens Bulloch (father); James Dunwoody Bulloch (half-brother); Martha Bulloch Roosevelt (sister)
- Military career
- Allegiance: Confederate States of America
- Branch: Confederate States Navy
- Service years: 1861–1865
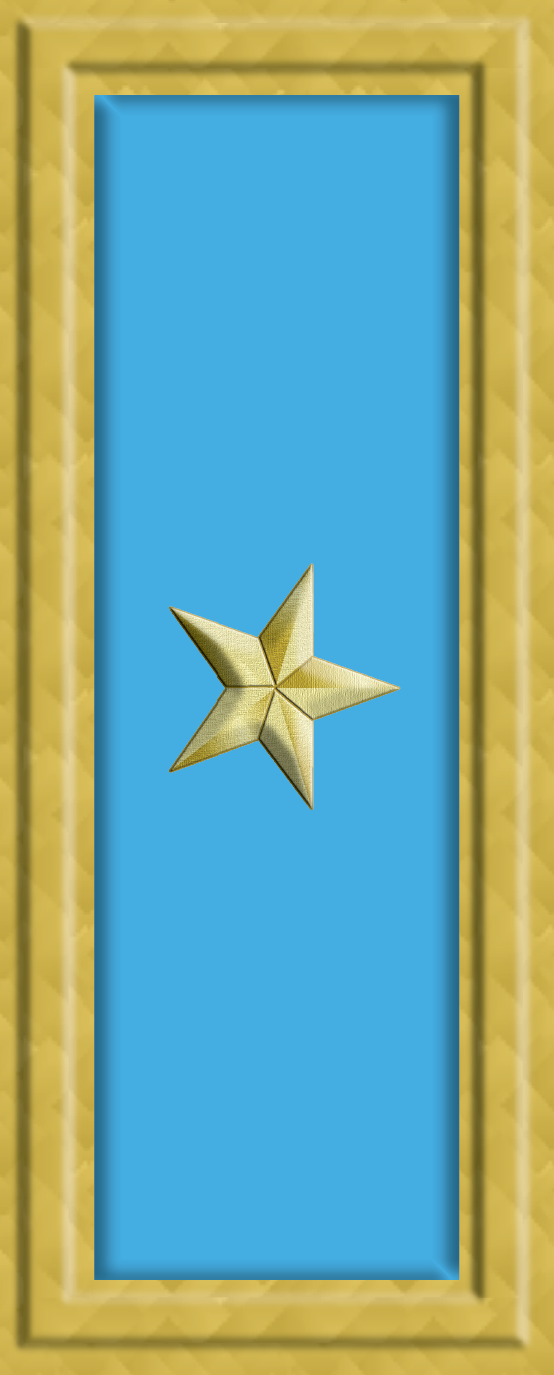
- Rank: Lieutenant
- Conflicts: American Civil War

Irvine Stephens Bulloch (June 25, 1842 – July 14, 1898) was an officer in the Confederate Navy and the youngest officer on the famed warship CSS Alabama. He fired its last shot before it was sunk off the coast of France at the end of the American Civil War. He was a half-brother of James Dunwoody Bulloch, who served as a foreign agent in Great Britain on behalf of the Confederacy, in part to arrange blockade runners.

== Childhood ==
Irvine Stephens Bulloch was born in Roswell, Georgia, to Major James Stephens Bulloch and his second wife, Martha "Patsy" Stewart. His maternal grandfather was General Daniel Stewart. The Bulloch family had moved from the Low Country to Roswell, Georgia in 1838, and he grew up in the antebellum mansion, Bulloch Hall, which his father had built at his plantation. He also had cotton mills. Among Irvine's siblings was his sister Martha Stewart "Mittie" Bulloch. Mittie married and was the mother of future U.S. President Theodore Roosevelt and paternal grandmother of First Lady Anna Eleanor Roosevelt.

Irvine and his elder half-brother James Dunwoody Bulloch served in the Confederate armed forces and as foreign agents for the Confederacy in the Civil War.

== Naval service in the Confederacy ==
In 1861 Bulloch served as a midshipman aboard the CSS Nashville, visiting the port of Southampton in England. The Nashville returned to the Confederate States of America, and the James River Squadron, where she was renamed the Rattlesnake.

Midshipman Bulloch was posted to England for foreign service and he served with distinction aboard the CSS Alabama. His nephew, President Theodore Roosevelt, later said that Irvine fired the last two shots from that vessel.

After the loss of the Alabama, Bulloch returned to Liverpool. He was sent out on the Laurel in October 1864 to join the CSS Shenandoah as sailing master. Irvine navigated the Shenandoah from just off San Francisco back to Liverpool, arriving on November 6, 1865. Upon his return to Liverpool, Irvine discovered that he had been promoted to lieutenant, but had no government to serve in that capacity as the Civil War was over and the Confederacy had collapsed into history.

== Postbellum influence and collaboration with nephew Theodore Roosevelt ==
Irvine Bulloch and brother James around 1865. Irvine is on the right.

Denied amnesty, Irvine Bulloch remained in Liverpool after the war. He worked as a cotton merchant with his brother, who also was denied amnesty.

In 1869, when his sister Mittie and the Roosevelt family toured Europe, the first port they reached was in Liverpool where a joyous reunion took place. Although T.R. at first seem to show no interest in his uncle's exploits, he was no johnny-come-lately to naval topics and history. In fact, Bulloch's nephew's childhood had been filled with stories told him by Bulloch's sister, Mittie. T.R. would write that his mother used "to talk to me as a little shaver about ships, ships, ships and the fighting of ships, until they sank into the depths of my soul." Both uncles were denied entrance to USA, but through family influence they entered through Canada and visited their sister Mittie. In 1894, Irvine visited his nephew Elliott Roosevelt in New York City in the days before the latter's death.

Filled with his mother and uncle's stories, by the time T.R. went to Harvard, he was already dreaming of writing a book on a neglected aspect of American military history, the role played by the U.S. Navy during the War of 1812. Indeed, right in the middle of classes on mathematics at Harvard, (Morris TR Vol 1, 565) T.R.'s mind would wander from his tedious course work to the accomplishments of the infant U.S. Navy, the clash of the "fighting tops".

When T.R.'s father took the family on their grand tour in 1869, TR spent time with those uncles in Liverpool, their first port of call on the trip. When T.R. graduated from Harvard, he published his first book, the excellent story of the U.S. Navy's origins and actions in the War of 1812 called The Naval War of 1812, which, in part, was an outgrowth of the influence of his two Bulloch uncles and the more direct influence of Irvine's brother, James.

== Military service ==
Irvine and his elder half-brother James Dunwoody Bulloch, who had served in the U.S. Navy for 14 years before joining a private shipping company, were both seafaring men. When the Southern states left the Union and the Civil War began in 1861, one of the first Union acts was to begin a strangling naval blockade on the Confederacy. With these developments, the two brothers decided to serve the southern cause.

In 1861, Irvine Bulloch became a midshipman on the CSS Alabama, its construction having been arranged by James D. Bulloch and a secret purchase made by the Confederacy, to use the ship as a raider to prey upon Union shipping. Irvine fought against the U.S. government long after the surrender of General Lee. He fired the last gun on the cruiser CSS Alabama before it went down in the harbor of Cherbourg, France.

Bulloch's sword is in the Merseyside Maritime Museum's collection in Liverpool, England. His nephew Theodore Roosevelt and wife Edith Carow Roosevelt saw it during their visit to the city. At the same museum, President Roosevelt spoke of his uncle with affection and high praise.

== Final years in Liverpool, England ==
Irvine lived in Sydenham Avenue, Liverpool, and died at the age of 56 at Selby Tower, Rhos-on-Sea (Llandrillo yn Rhos), Colwyn Bay, Wales. The cause of his death was Bright's Disease and cerebral hemorrhage. He was buried in Toxteth Park Cemetery in Liverpool, in a grave alongside his brother's family. In 2009 a ceremony organised by Sons of Confederate Veterans, a Neo-Confederate organisation at Toxteth Park Cemetery held a rededication of the grave of Irvine Bulloch

== Theodore Roosevelt on his uncles ==
In 1905, Theodore Roosevelt toured the South. After spending October 19 in North Carolina and skipping South Carolina, T.R. visited Roswell, Georgia, the next day. He spoke to the citizens there as his "neighbors and friends" and concluded his remarks as follows:

It has been my very great good fortune to have the right to claim my blood is half southern and half northern, and I would deny the right of any man here to feel a greater pride in the deeds of every southerner than I feel. Of all the children, the brothers and sisters of my mother who were born and brought up in that house on the hill there, my two uncles afterward entered the Confederate service and served with the Confederate Navy.

One, the younger man, served on the Alabama as the youngest officer aboard her. He was captain of one of her broadside 32-pounders in her final fight, and when at the very end the Alabama was sinking and the Kearsarge passed under her stern and came up along the side that had not been engaged hitherto, my uncle, Irvine Bulloch, shifted his gun from one side to the other and fired the two last shots fired from the Alabama. James Dunwoody Bulloch was an admiral in the Confederate service. Men and women, don't you think I have the ancestral right to claim a proud kinship with those who showed their devotion to duty as they saw the duty, whether they wore the grey or whether they wore the blue? All Americans who are worthy the name feel an equal pride in the valor of those who fought on one side or the other, provided only that each did with all his strength and soul and mind his duty as it was given to him to see his duty.

— Theodore Roosevelt

On page 12 of T.R.'s autobiography, he mentions his uncle Irvine: "My mother's two brothers, James Dunwoody Bulloch and Irvine Bulloch, came to visit us shortly after the close of the war. Both came under assumed names, as they were among the Confederates who were at that time exempted from the amnesty... My uncle Irvine Bulloch was a midshipman on the Alabama, and fired the last gun discharged from her batteries in the fight with the Kearsarge. Both of these uncles lived in Liverpool after the war. "

== See also ==
- List of ships of the Confederate States Navy

== General and cited references ==
- Bulloch, Irvine (1884). The secret service of the Confederate States in Europe, or How Confederate cruisers were equipped, Vol I. New York : G.P. Putnam's Sons.
- Bulloch, Irvine (1884). The secret service of the Confederate States in Europe, or How Confederate cruisers were equipped, Vol II. New York : G.P. Putnam's Sons.
