= Barrington Hall (Roswell, Georgia) =

Historic house in Georgia, United States

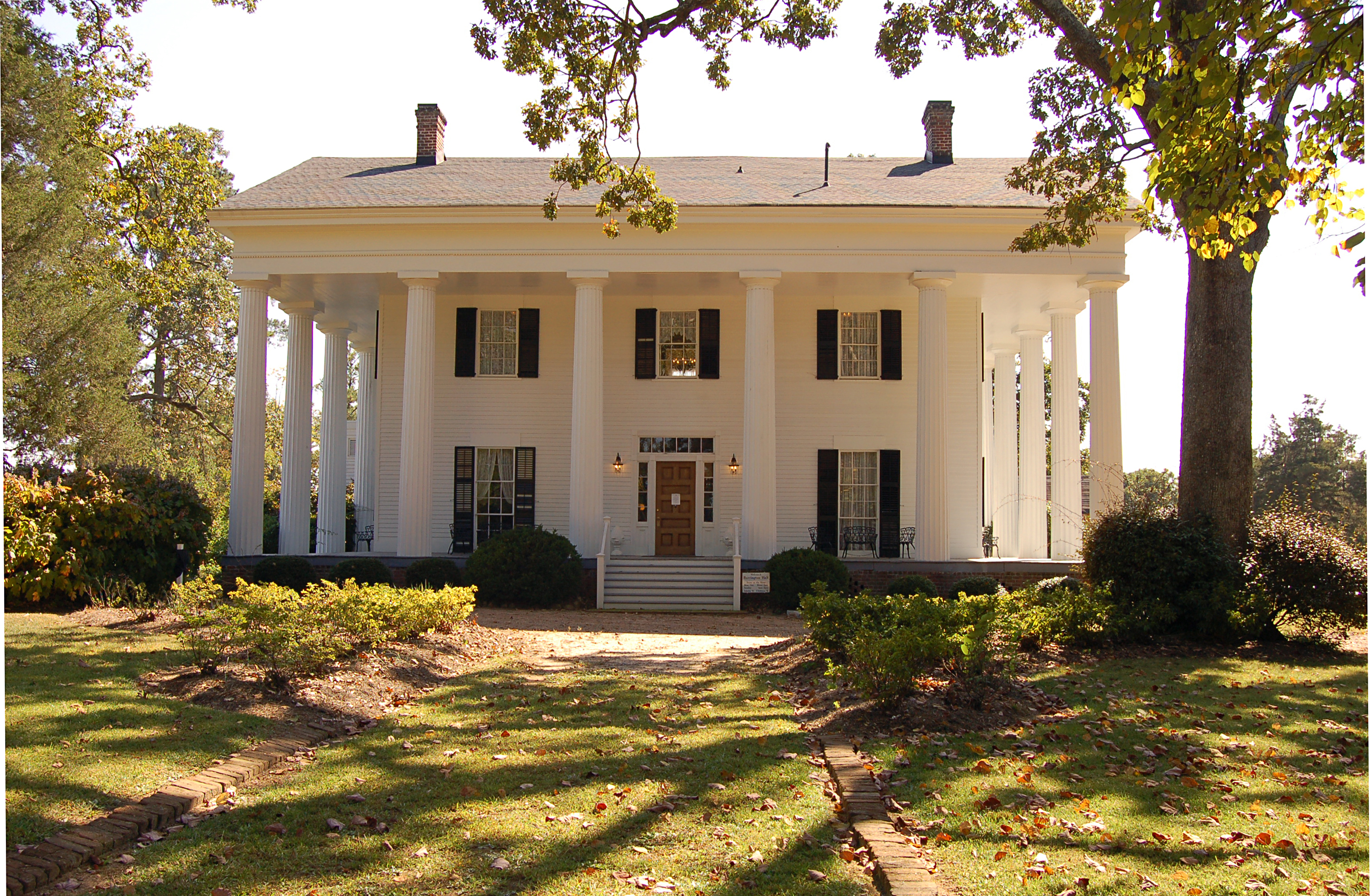
- Barrington Hall in Roswell, Georgia

General information
- Architectural style: Greek Revival architecture
- Barrington Hall
- U.S. National Register of Historic Places
- U.S. Historic district – Contributing property
- Location within Georgia Location within the United States
- Location: 60 Marietta St., Roswell, Georgia
- Coordinates: 34°0′47″N 84°21′50″W
- Area: 6 acres (2.4 ha)
- Built: 1839
- Architect: Willis Ball
- Architectural style: Greek Revival
- Part of: Roswell Historic District (ID74000682)
- NRHP reference No.: 71000275

Significant dates
- Added to NRHP: December 9, 1971
- Designated CP: May 2, 1974
- Location: 535 Barrington Dr. Roswell, GA 30075; United States
- Construction started: 1830s

Barrington Hall is an 1842 Greek Revival-style plantation home. It was the residence of Barrington King who, along with his father Roswell King, was the founder of the town of Roswell, in northern Fulton County, Georgia. The house was designed by Willis Ball. It was held by the family until 1995 and is listed on the National Register of Historic Places.

Ranked as one of the "50 Most Beautiful Homes in Metro Atlanta" by Atlanta magazine, the mansion has been fully restored and furnished with many period and family pieces. It is owned and operated as a house museum by the City of Roswell. A variety of events for families are held at the mansion and on the grounds throughout the year, as well as daily tours of the house.

== History ==
Roswell King was born in Connecticut but settled in Darien, Georgia. He worked for the Bank of Darien and was asked to manage the bank's interests in the gold fields of north Georgia.

He came across this area in the late 1820s and was impressed with its beauty, while realizing the water power potential of Vickery Creek to drive textile mills. In 1836 he returned to the area with his son Barrington and they began planning the mill and the town.

Barrington moved his family to the area in 1838, and in 1839 the Roswell Manufacturing Company was incorporated. The Kings invited friends to move to the new town they called the “Colony” and invest in the Roswell Manufacturing Company. Some of these families included the Smiths, the Bullochs, and the Dunwodys. The Colony was named Roswell, for Barrington King's father, in 1854.

Barrington King selected the highest point in Roswell for his home, Barrington Hall. It was built by Willis Ball in the Greek Revival style of architecture. When the house was finished in 1842, Barrington lived in it with his wife, Catherine, until his death in 1866. The Kings had nine children who survived to adulthood: eight sons and one daughter. In 1883 the Kings’ only daughter, Eva and her husband, Rev. William Baker, moved back to Barrington Hall to care for the elderly Catherine King.

The Baker family lived at Barrington Hall until Eva's death in 1923. William Baker had died several years before in 1906. After Eva's death, the house and property was left to Evelyn Simpson, Eva Baker's favorite granddaughter, and Eva's seven children. The other heirs wanted to sell the house, but Evelyn was determined to keep it in the family. With the help of her mother Kate Baker Simpson and other family members, Evelyn raised enough money to purchase the house from the other Baker siblings. With limited money and the help of her sister Katharine, Evelyn Simpson preserved Barrington Hall until her death in 1960.

Upon Evelyn's death, her sister Katharine Simpson became the owner of Barrington Hall. She left her teaching job in Atlanta and moved to Barrington Hall to manage it on a full-time basis. In 1970 Katharine met a woman named Lois Carson; they became good friends and Katharine adopted her, so that she would inherit Barrington Hall after Katharine's death. Katharine died in 1995, just before her 100th birthday. Lois Carson continued to live at Barrington Hall until her death in 2003. Before Carson died, she entrusted Barrington Hall to her friend Sarah Winner.

The new owner, Sarah Winner, spent two years restoring the property. She had all of the original furnishings and paintings restored. Craftsmen also painstakingly restored the horse-hair plaster walls, ceilings, heart-of-pine floors, and moldings. Her efforts won the Georgia Trust for Historic Preservation's Outstanding Restoration Award. In 2005 she sold the property to the City of Roswell, with legal agreements designed to ensure the home would be permanently protected and open to the public for historic, educational, and cultural purposes.

== Present ==
The historic home is now owned and operated as a house museum by the City of Roswell. The home has been fully restored and furnished with many original family possessions. The surrounding seven acres of grounds feature the only antebellum public garden in the greater Atlanta area.

Barrington Hall is listed on the National Register of Historic Places individually and also as a contributing building in the Roswell Historic District. It was included in Atlanta magazine's list of the "50 Most Beautiful Homes in Metro Atlanta".
