= Roswell King =

American businessman & slave owner (1765–1844)

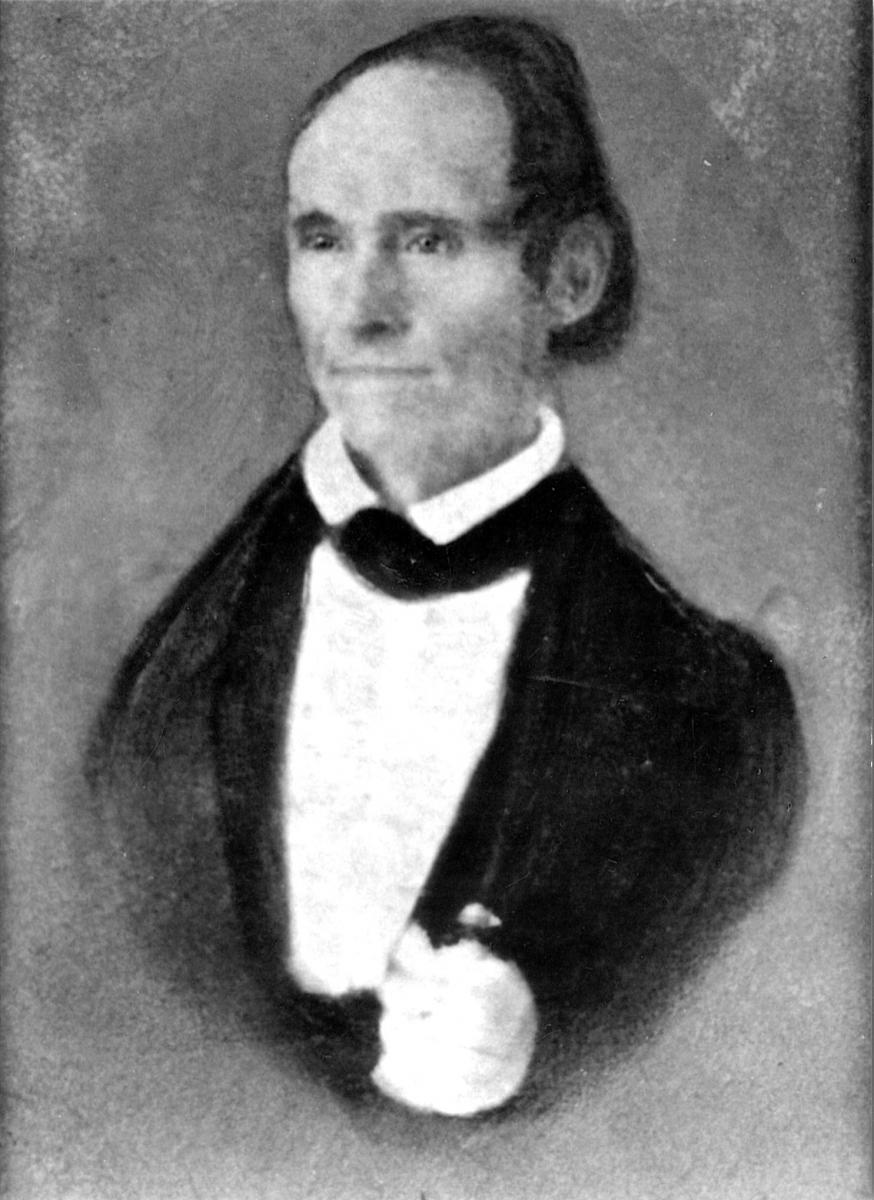
Roswell King

Roswell King (May 3, 1765 – February 15, 1844) was an American businessman, planter, slave owner, and industrialist. Together with his son, Barrington King, he founded Roswell Manufacturing Company in the Georgia Piedmont, establishing a cotton mill and industrial complex. They co-founded the town of Roswell, Georgia, inviting friends to be part of its and the mill's development in the 1830s. Roswell's family originally hailed from Delaware but later moved to Connecticut where they were among the first residents of New Haven and later Windsor. As a teen, Roswell participated in the American Revolutionary War as part of the naval resistance before moving to Georgia's low country.

== Early life ==
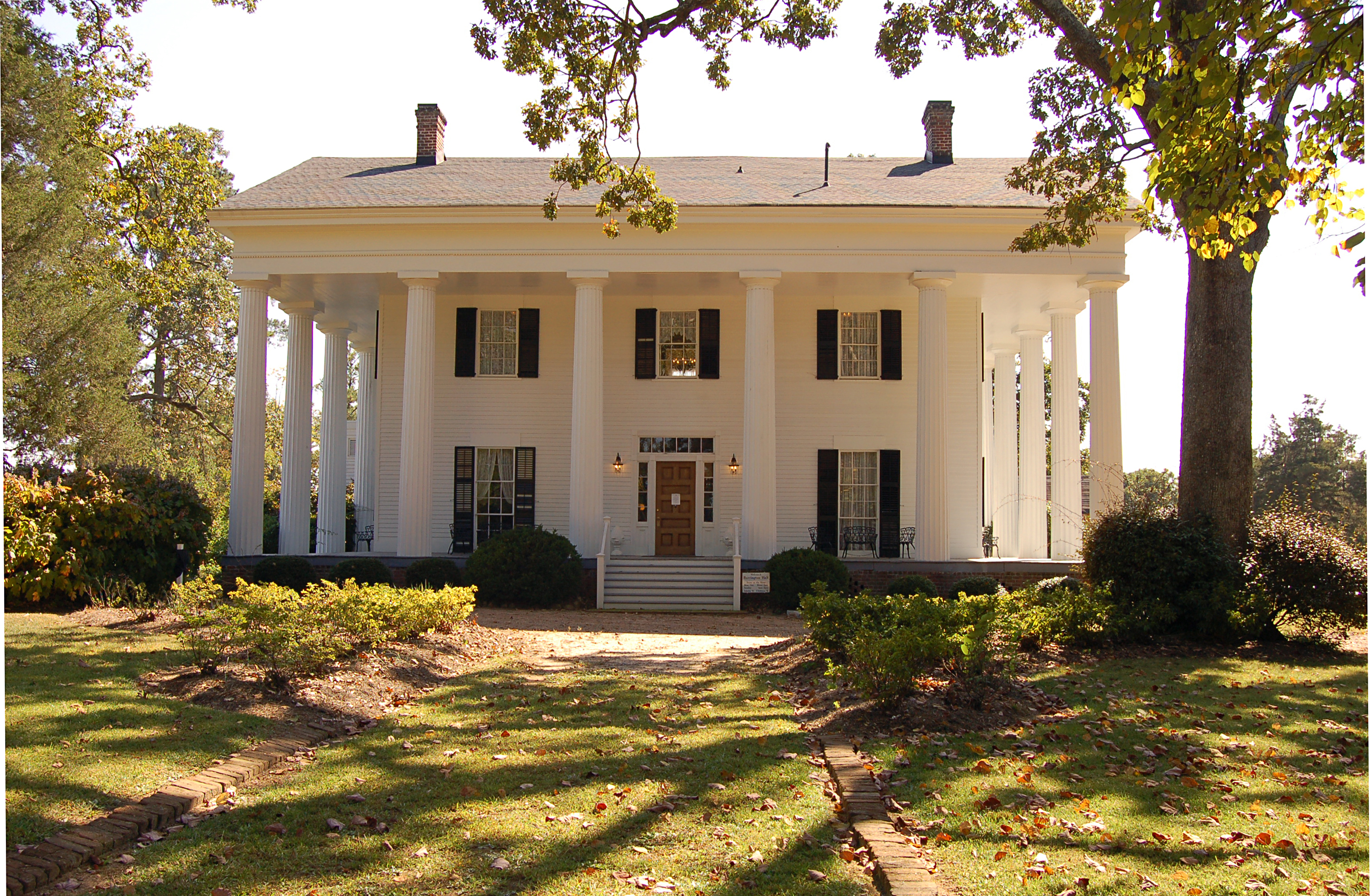
Barrington Hall, built in 1842

King was born in Windsor, Connecticut, in 1765, the son of Timothy King, a weaver and Revolutionary naval commander, and Sarah (née Fitch) King. At the age of fifteen in 1780, he moved to Darien, Georgia, in the Low Country and started working. His early professional life included jobs as a surveyor in Glynn County and Justice of the Peace in McIntosh County.

== Plantation manager ==
King eventually became manager of Major Pierce Butler's rice and cotton plantations on Butler and St. Simons islands, Georgia, where he worked until 1820. The plantations covered hundreds of acres on each island. A total of 500 slaves worked and lived on the two plantations. King also owned a plantation and numerous slaves to work it in Darien, where he became a bank manager.

In the 1830s, King moved his family from the coast to the Piedmont area around Vickery Creek (referred to as Cedar Creek at the time), the area of the future town of Roswell. King had identified this as a good area for the construction of a cotton mill. He had the idea to combine cotton production and cotton processing at the same location. The invention of the cotton gin had made cultivation of short-staple cotton profitable in the uplands of the South. King invited planter friends James Stephens Bulloch and Archibald Smith to join him in the new enterprise.

== Roswell, Georgia ==
When he moved, King transported 36 enslaved African Americans with him from his plantation and bought another 42 slaves in Darien to work on constructing the mill, infrastructure and other buildings at the new complex. The slaves likely built much of his house(s) as well. They brought Gee Chee culture from the coast to the Piedmont area.

King dammed the creek to power a cotton mill, which became fully operational by the latter half of the decade. The mill was incorporated as the Roswell Manufacturing Company by an act of the Georgia General Assembly on December 11, 1839. His son Barrington King served as the company president. Other people named in the act included John Dunwoody and James Stephens Bulloch, friends who he had invited to participate in the company and community. King was known as a master of efficiency and jack of all trades having found much success in farming, banking, and finally manufacturing in the mostly agrarian South.

After living in temporary homes for his first years in the area, Roswell King (who was recently widowed) moved into Primrose Cottage in 1839 along with his recently widowed daughter Eliza King Hand and her children. He died on February 15, 1844.

He was buried in what is now referred to as Founders' Cemetery on Sloan Street in Roswell, just to the north of the original location of the mill. Some of his personal "servants" (enslaved African Americans) were buried near him in unmarked graves.

=== Barrington King ===
Barrington King built his mansion, Barrington Hall, on the square in Roswell. It was designed by Willis Ball in 1839.

At Roswell Manufacturing Company, King continued to depend on the skills and labor of enslaved African Americans as he built the business. According to the 1850 Census Slave Schedules, King personally held 70 slaves, and he controlled another 13 slaves held in the name of Roswell Manufacturing Company. In 1860, King still held 47 slaves. He may have sold some when the heavy construction work was finished.

== Fanny Kemble's account ==
As powerful and successful men, Roswell King and his sons lived out some of the complexities of their times. Roswell King Sr. had conflicts with Major Pierce Butler when he managed his island plantations in Georgia because Butler took a more moderate approach to the treatment of slaves than did King. Butler was one of the wealthiest men in the South when King worked for him. After the father left in 1820, Butler hired his son Roswell King Jr. as plantation manager.

The plantations were inherited by Pierce (Mease) Butler. In the winter of 1838–1839, he and his wife Fanny Kemble, a noted British actress, stayed for the winter at Butler Island Plantation and St. Simons islands. According to Kemble's journal of the visit, Roswell King was reported to have fathered one or more mixed-race children by enslaved women. She wrote that Bran, a mixed-race slave said to be King's son, was conceived and born while King's wife was still alive. He became a driver (supervisor) of other slaves on the plantation.

Roswell King Jr. (1796–1854), the second son and namesake, took over as manager of the Butler plantations in 1820 and worked there until 1838, after which he moved to Alabama to develop his own plantation. Kemble wrote in her journal that he was said to have fathered several mixed-race children during his tenure. She identified them as including Renty, the twins Ben and Daphne, and Jem Valiant, whose mothers were the slave women Betty, Minda, and Judy, respectively. The slave Scylla also had a child by King Jr. These children were born into slavery, as under slave law, children took the status of their mother by the principle of partus sequitur ventrem. Kemble attested to these children by her direct observations and from stories told her by slaves during her residence. During this period, she complained to her husband about King Jr.'s harsh treatment of slaves, as slave women especially appealed to her for help to lighten their work. With their marriage deteriorating, Butler threatened Kemble with no access to their daughters if she published any of her observations about the plantations.

Kemble did not publish her account until 1863, long after their divorce in 1849 and after her daughters had reached their majority. According to the historian Catherine Clinton, King Jr.'s granddaughter, Julia King, wrote to a friend in 1930, saying that Kemble had told lies about her grandfather because he refused to return her affections. The historian Bell documented that the marriage of Kemble and Pierce Butler was fraught with conflict by that time, and was undermined by episodes of spousal infidelity. It ended in separation in 1847 and divorce in 1849. But, Kemble's observing that white planters and managers had mixed-race children with slave women was consistent with other reports of the times, such as Mary Chesnut's diary of the Civil War era, and numerous other accounts.

According to Clinton, Kemble may have falsified portions of her journal. The historian Deirdre David says some readers have found Kemble's descriptions of slaves' appearances and lives to be racist. But, David notes that Kemble's views on race were "not anomalous" in the 19th-century among English writings on the topic. In that context, David described Kemble's descriptions as "relatively mild and moderately conventional." (Historians of the period have noted such contradictions in many contemporary writings, including those of Thomas Jefferson, who opposed slavery but was prejudiced against blacks.)

David notes that King Jr. published his own account of the "brutal system he deplored" in a long letter to The Southern Agriculturalist on 13 September 1828, in which he said that overseers were responsible for much of the cruelty to slaves. He preferred to use differing work rather than physical punishment, for instance, and said he did not condone whipping. David notes that if his account is accurate, the diet and treatment of slaves on the Butler plantation seemed to have deteriorated dramatically between 1828 and what Kemble saw and reported in 1838, shortly after King Jr. had left.

Kemble's journal appears to quote King Jr. verbatim:

I hate the institution of slavery with all my heart; I consider it an absolute curse wherever it exists. It will keep those states where it does exist fifty years behind the others in improvement and prosperity.

== Notes ==
=== Sources ===
- Bell, Malcolm Jr. (1987). Major Butler's Legacy: Five Generations of a Slaveholding Family. Athens and London: University of Georgia.
- David, Deirdre (2007). Fanny Kemble: A Performed Life. Philadelphia: University of Pennsylvania. ISBN 978-0812240238.
- King, Julia. "Julia King to ____, 24 October 1930". Julia King Letters and Clippings, 1930–1935 (MS 1070). Savannah, Georgia: Georgia Historical Society.
- Kemble, Fanny (1863). Journal of a Residence on a Georgian Plantation 1838–1839. – via ebook at Project Gutenberg
- Kemble, Frances Anne (1984). Journal of a Residence on a Georgian Plantation in 1838–1839. Edited and introduction by John A. Scott. Athens, Georgia: University of Georgia Press. ISBN 9-780-8203-0707-7.
- Kemble, Fanny (2000). Fanny Kemble's Journals. Edited and introduction by Catherine Clinton. Cambridge: Harvard University Press.
