= List of public art in Roswell, Georgia =

This is a list of public art in Roswell, Georgia, in the United States. This list applies only to works of public art on permanent display in an outdoor public space. For example, this does not include artwork in museums. Public art may include sculptures, statues, monuments, memorials, murals, and mosaics.

Image	Title / subject	Location and coordinates	Date	Artist / designer	Type	Material	Dimensions	Designation	Owner / administrator	Wikidata	Notes
More images	Ask The Fish 2.0	Don White Park - Under GA 400 Bridge 34.010078°N 84.332355°W	2018	Dr. Stephen Fairfield	Sculpture	fiberglass, steel, holographic film	14 feet (4.3 m) x 6 feet (1.8 m) x 5 feet (1.5 m)				
More images	Faces of War Memorial	City Hall 34.022503°N 84.360994°W	1998		Sculpture						
More images	Granite Ring	Roswell City Hall 34.023067°N 84.358558°W	2018	Chris Rothermel	Sculpture	Blue Pearl Granite	60 inches (150 cm) x 20 inches (51 cm) x 8 inches (20 cm)				
	Horse Apple	Leita Thompson Park	2018	James Hetherington	Sculpture	steel plate (from heavy bakery equipment), rebar (from a highway construction site), steel shot (from a rock crusher)	15 feet (4.6 m) x 8 feet (2.4 m) x 32 inches (81 cm) x 2.5 inches (6.4 cm) base				
	Oak Leaf Triptych	Roswell Area Park	2016	Jim Galluci	Sculpture						
	Reception	Roswell Riverwalk	2017	Fred Ajamogha	Sculpture	stone					
More images	Reclining Mother and Child	Roswell Library 34.0246°N 84.3580°W	ca. 1960	Steffan Thomas	Sculpture	Georgia marble					
More images	Roswall	Forrest Street 34°1′19.53″N 84°21′26.17″W	2008	Donna Pinter	Mosaic				City of Roswell		
	Roswell Town Square Obelisk	Roswell Town Square 34.0150°N 84.3633°W			Obelisk						
	Sentience	Heart of Roswell Park	2017	David Landis	Sculpture	Stainless steel					
More images	Smoke	Roswell Town Square 34°00′52.47″N 84°21′47.89″W	2016	Mark Moulton	Sculpture	aluminum and self-weathering steel					
	Steady	NE Corner of Canton & Norcross Streets 34.025524°N 84.361374°W	2017	Ben Pierce	Sculpture	steel, polyurethane paint	11.5 feet (3.5 m) tall x 6.5 feet (2.0 m) wide x 2 feet (0.61 m) deep				
	Sweet Pops of Brilliance	East Roswell Park	2017	Craig Snyder	Sculpture	Steel			City of Roswell		
More images	The Uniting of Work and Spirit	Roswell Mill 34.013611°N 84.358711°W	2018	Robert Clements	Sculpture	steel	106 inches (270 cm) x 30 inches (76 cm) x 30 inches (76 cm)		City of Roswell		
More images	Vector	Roswell Mill 34.0133°N 84.3592°W		Will Darnell	Sculpture	steel, bronze					
