= Face of War =

Face of War or Faces of War may refer to:

- The Face of War, a 1940 painting by Salvador Dalí
- The Face of War, a 1959 collection of war correspondence by Martha Gellhorn
- A Face of War, a 1968 documentary on the Vietnam War
- Faces of War, a 2006 computer wargame
- Faces of War Memorial, a Vietnam War memorial in Roswell, Georgia
- The Two Faces of War, a 2007 documentary on the memory of the Guinea-Bissau War of Independence
