= Rowswell =

Rowswell is a surname. Notable people with the surname include:

- Brad Rowswell (born 1986), Australian politician
- Garth Rowswell, Canadian politician
- John Rowswell (1955–2010), Canadian politician
- Rosey Rowswell (1884–1955), American radio sportscaster

== See also ==
- Roswell (disambiguation)
