= Chattahoochee River National Recreation Area =

Protected area in Georgia, U.S.

- IUCN category V (protected landscape/seascape)
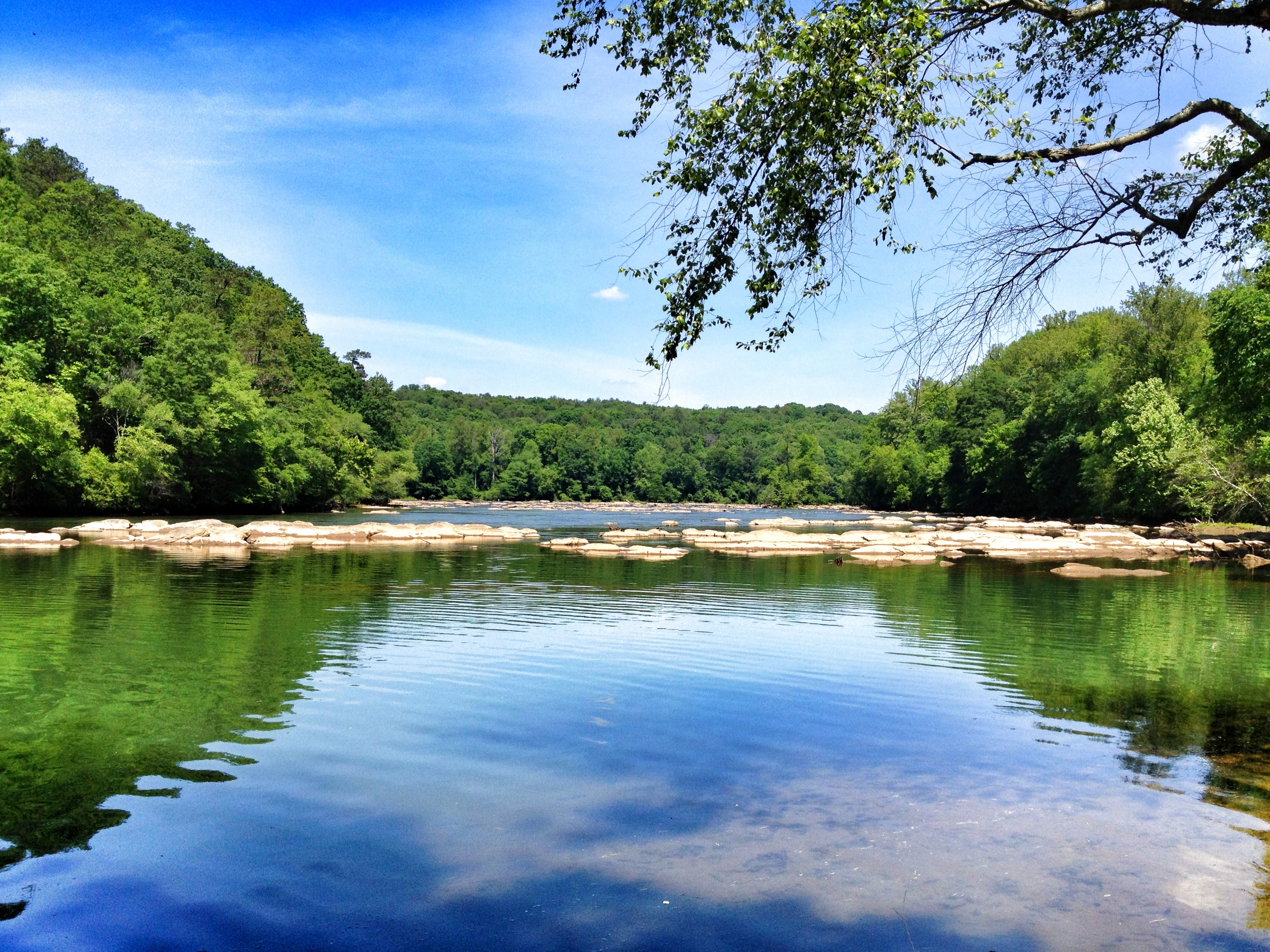
- View northwards up the river from Atlanta at East Palisades (April 2012)

- Location within Georgia Location within the United States
- Interactive map of Chattahoochee River National Recreation Area
- Location: Cobb, Forsyth, Fulton, & Gwinnett counties, Georgia, USA
- Nearest city: Park headquarters: 1978 Island Ford Parkway, Sandy Springs, GA 30350
- Coordinates: 33°59′14″N 84°19′29″W
- Area: 10,550 acres (4,269 ha); 5,124 acres (2,074 ha) federal
- Established: August 15, 1978
- Visitors: 3,537,848 (in 2022)
- Governing body: National Park Service
- Website: Chattahoochee River National Recreation Area

Chattahoochee River National Recreation Area (CRNRA) preserves a series of sites between Atlanta and Lake Sidney Lanier along the Chattahoochee River in Georgia, U.S. The 48-mile (77 km) stretch of the river affords public recreation opportunities and access to historic sites. The national recreation area, a National Park Service unit, was established on August 15, 1978, by President Jimmy Carter.

The park headquarters and visitor center are located at the Island Ford Unit of the park, at 1978 Island Ford Parkway in Sandy Springs, Georgia. The Chattahoochee River is a stocked trout stream with 23 species of game fish. Year-round fishing is available with a Georgia fishing license and a trout stamp.

In 2012, the Chattahoochee National Recreation Area was designated as the Chattahoochee River Water Trail to become the first river named a National Water Trail. The National Water Trails System was created by the U.S. Department of the Interior to increase access to water-based outdoor recreation, encourage community stewardship of local waterways, and promote tourism.

Cochran Shoals is the largest and most popular unit of the park, featuring a 3-mile (4.8 km) fitness trail, suitable for walking/jogging/biking, which is wheelchair-accessible and is excellent for bird- and wildlife-watching. The historic Marietta Paper Mill ruins along Sope Creek are preserved within the Sope Creek unit of the area. The Akers Mill ruins along Rottenwood Creek are found within the West Palisades unit. Steep rock cliffs rise from the river's flood plain in the East Palisades unit of the park.

Power's Island was named for James Power (1790–1870). In 1835, he established Power's ferry on the Chattahoochee River, connecting what is now Sandy Springs to Cobb County. During the American Civil War, Power's Ferry, now spelled Powers Ferry, was used by units of General William Tecumseh Sherman's army in July 1864. The ferry was eventually replaced by a bridge, which was built in 1903.

The Vickery Creek unit preserves a rugged and scenic stretch of Vickery Creek (also known as Big Creek) from Grimes Bridge Road to its mouth at the Chattahoochee River. The ruins of Ivy Mill, which was a wool mill that produced fabric for Confederate soldiers, are located in this unit along with the historic Allenbrook House. Ivy Mill was destroyed by the Union Army in 1864 as part of the March to the Sea campaign, and the women factory workers were sent North for the duration of the war. The Allenbrook House, completed in 1857, was the home and office of the manager of Ivy Mill.

From the Vickery Creek Unit, pedestrians can use sidewalks and spur trails for convenient access to Chattahoochee River Park (a Roswell Recreation and Parks/Fulton County park), Riverside Park, Don White Memorial Park, Willeo Creek Park on the Cobb County line, Waller Park on Hog Wallow Creek, and the Chattahoochee Nature Center. Roswell Mill can be accessed via a spur trail and covered bridge that crosses the creek at the site of the Roswell Mill Machine Shop, which was built in 1853 and is the only original building left standing of the 1839 Roswell Manufacturing Company. The Roswell Mill building currently left standing was built in 1882 and is now used as an office complex.

The Chattahoochee River itself is one of Georgia's premier trout streams. It also offers picturesque areas for boating, canoeing, and rafting. It is very popular in the summer months for visitors to rent tubes and float from Powers Island to Paces Mill.

United States Park Rangers patrol the 48 miles (77 km) of river and 10,000 acres (4,000 ha) of land units with patrol vehicles, jet-powered boats, kayaks, and mountain bikes. They also hike the trails on foot. Rangers enforce park regulations as well as Georgia criminal and traffic codes, and are authorized to carry firearms and make arrests.

In 2014, the CRNRA was given the Award for Outstanding Service to Environmental Education by the Georgia Environmental Education Association – an affiliate of the North American Association for Environmental Education.

== Units ==
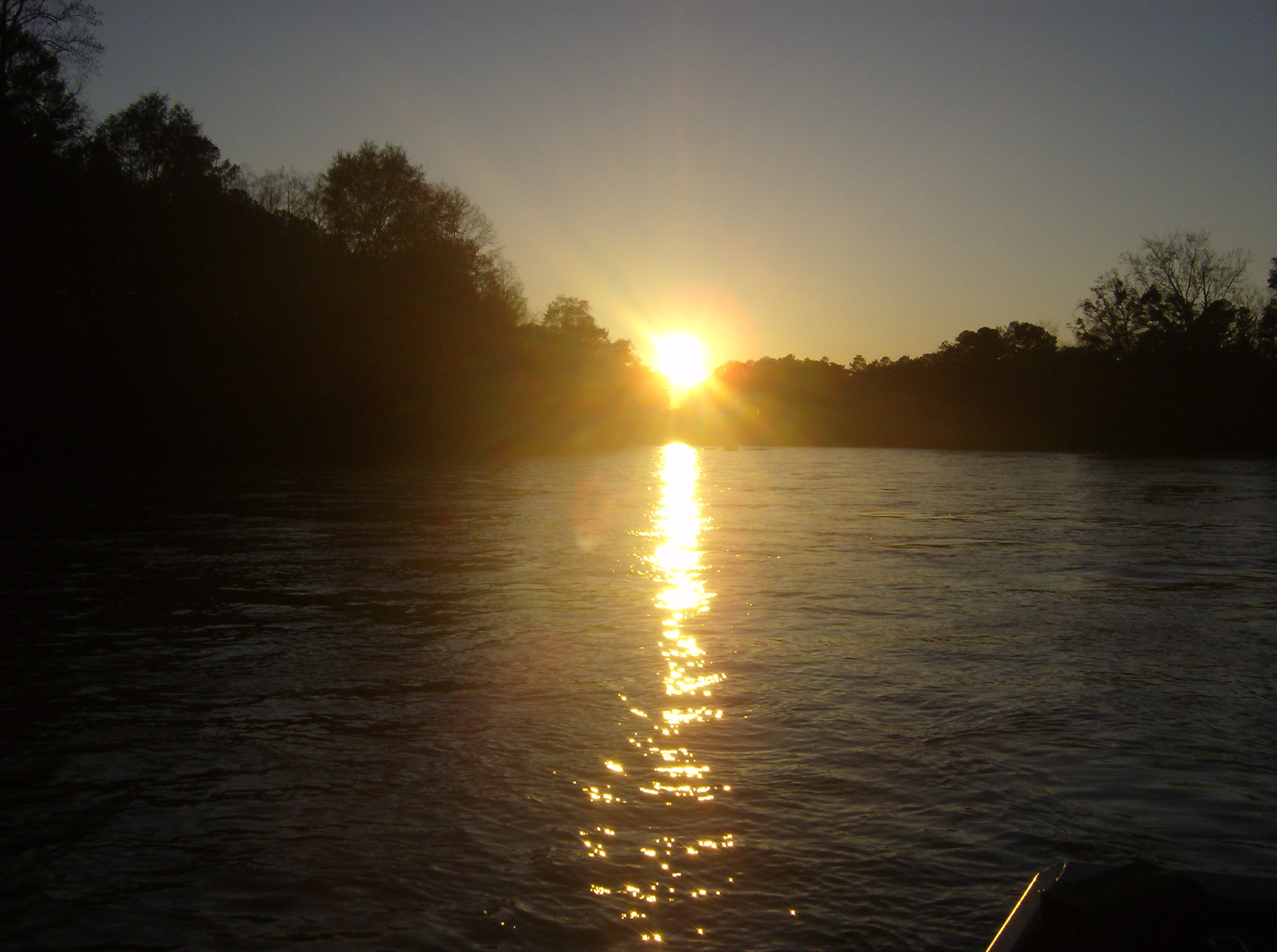
Chattahoochee River NRA Island Ford Shoals near Roswell, GA

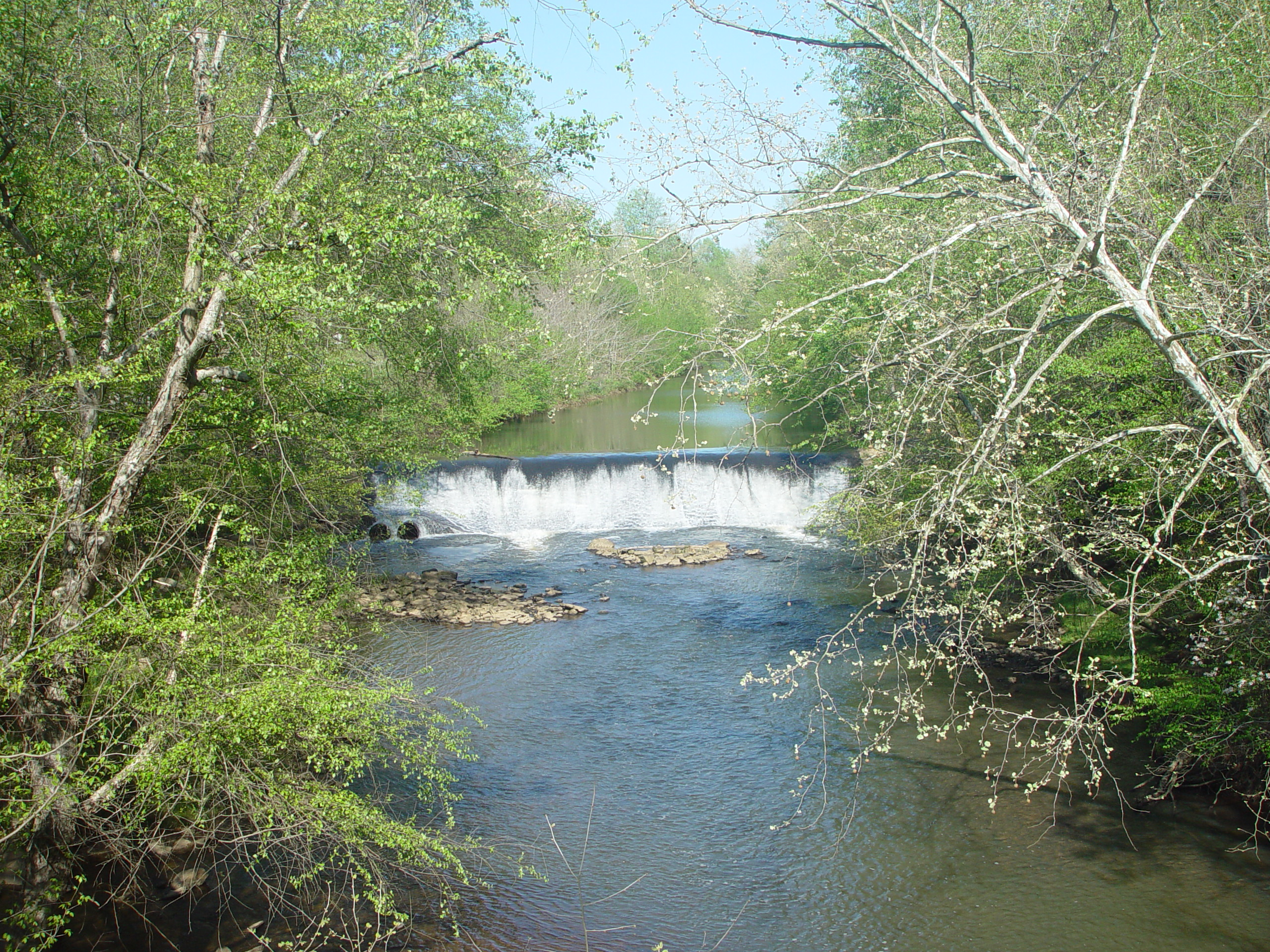
Vickery Creek Dam at Oxbo Road entrance of Vickery Creek unit

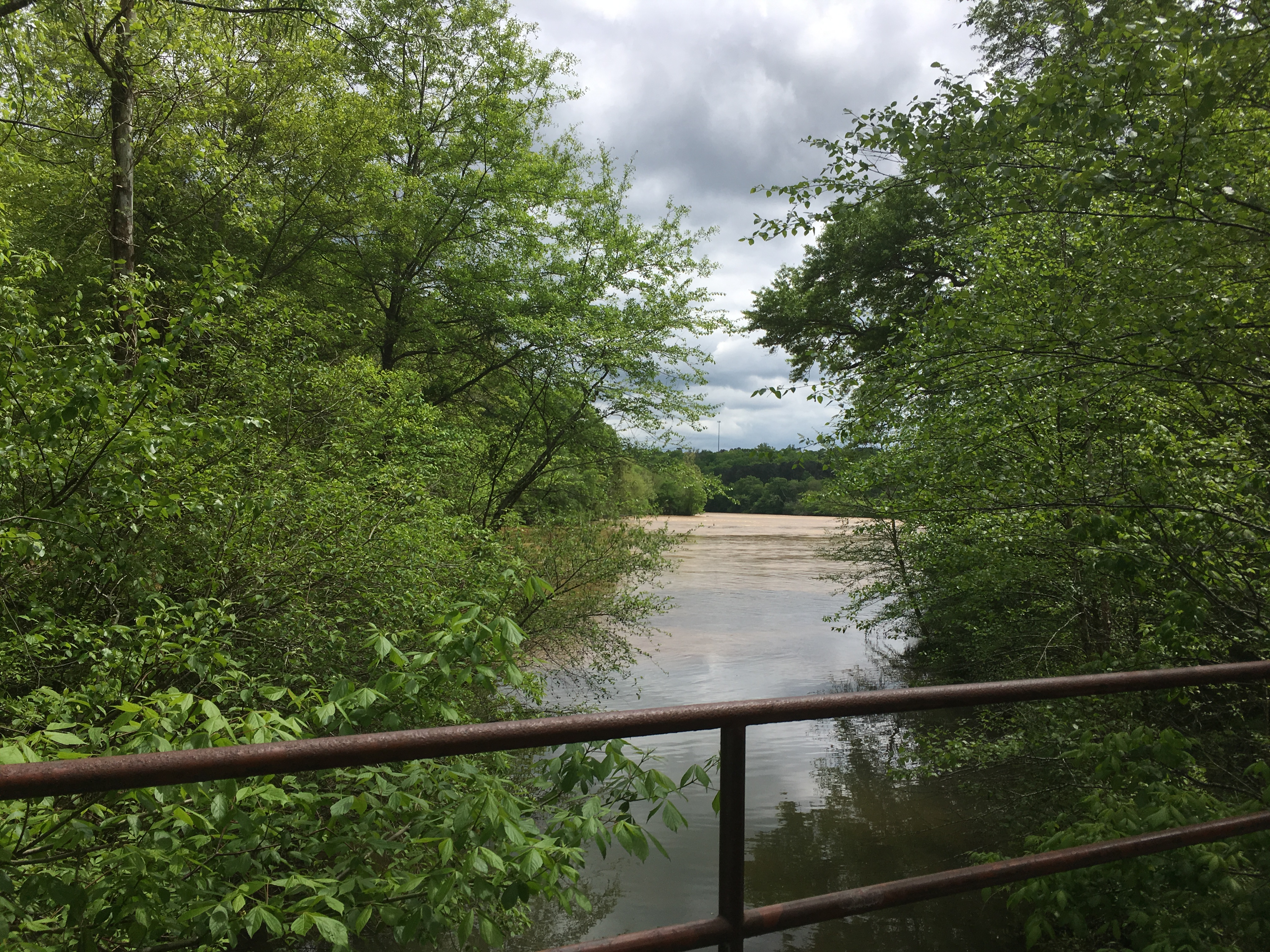
The Chattahoochee River in Sandy Springs

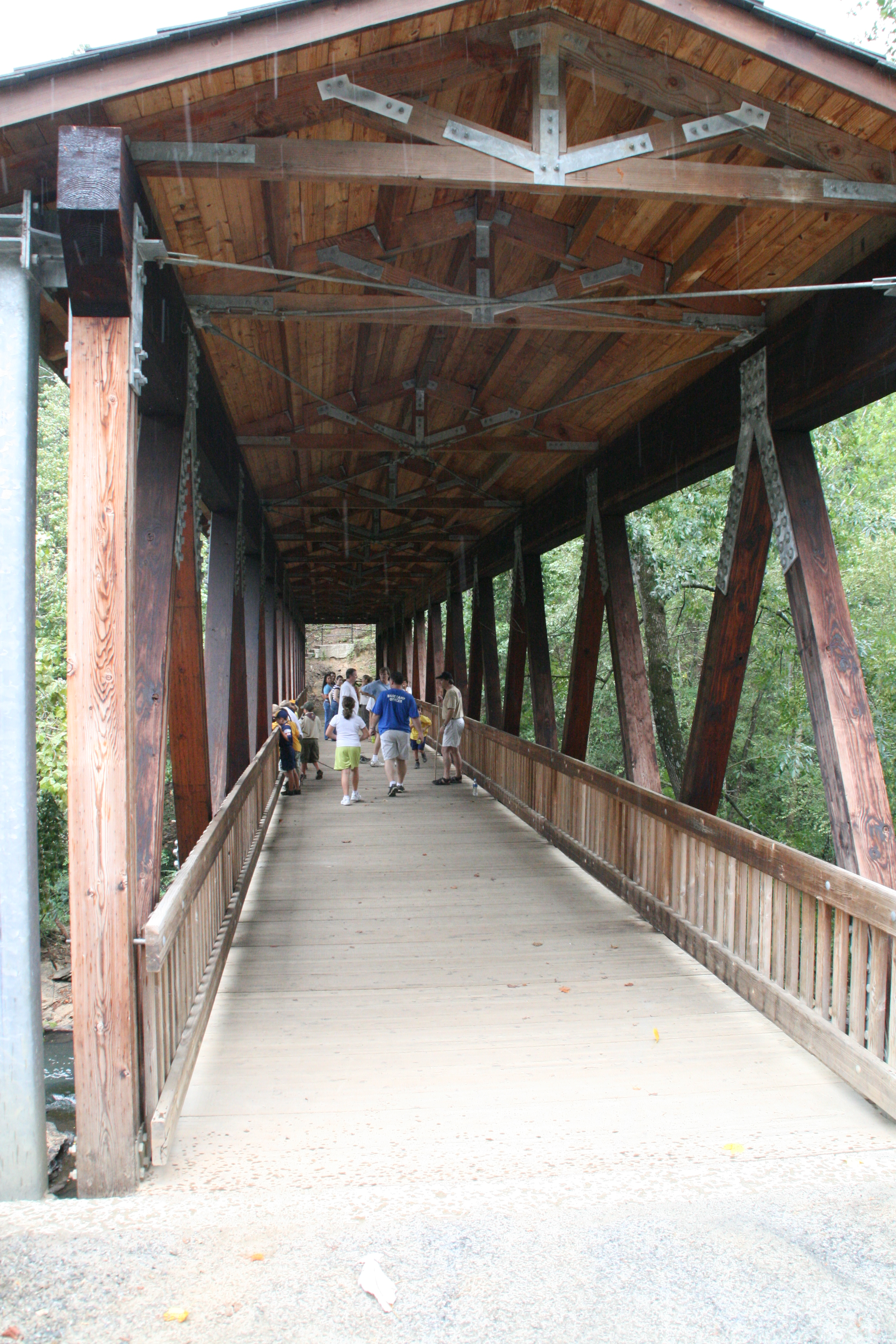
Covered bridge entrance to the Vickery Creek unit at the Roswell Mill Ruins (City of Roswell Park)

- Bowmans Island
- Settles Bridge
- Orrs Ferry
- Suwanee Creek
- McGinnis Ferry
- Medlock Bridge
- Abbots Bridge
- Jones Bridge
- Holcomb Bridge
- Island Ford
- Vickery Creek
- Gold Branch
- Sope Creek
- Johnson Ferry North
- Johnson Ferry South
- Cochran Shoals
- Powers Island
- East and West Palisades
