= Roswell High School =

Roswell High School may refer to:

- Roswell High School (Georgia), a public high school in Roswell, Georgia
- Roswell High School (New Mexico), a public high school in Roswell, New Mexico

== See also ==
- Roswell (disambiguation)
