= Vickery Creek =

Big Creek aka (Vickery Creek)
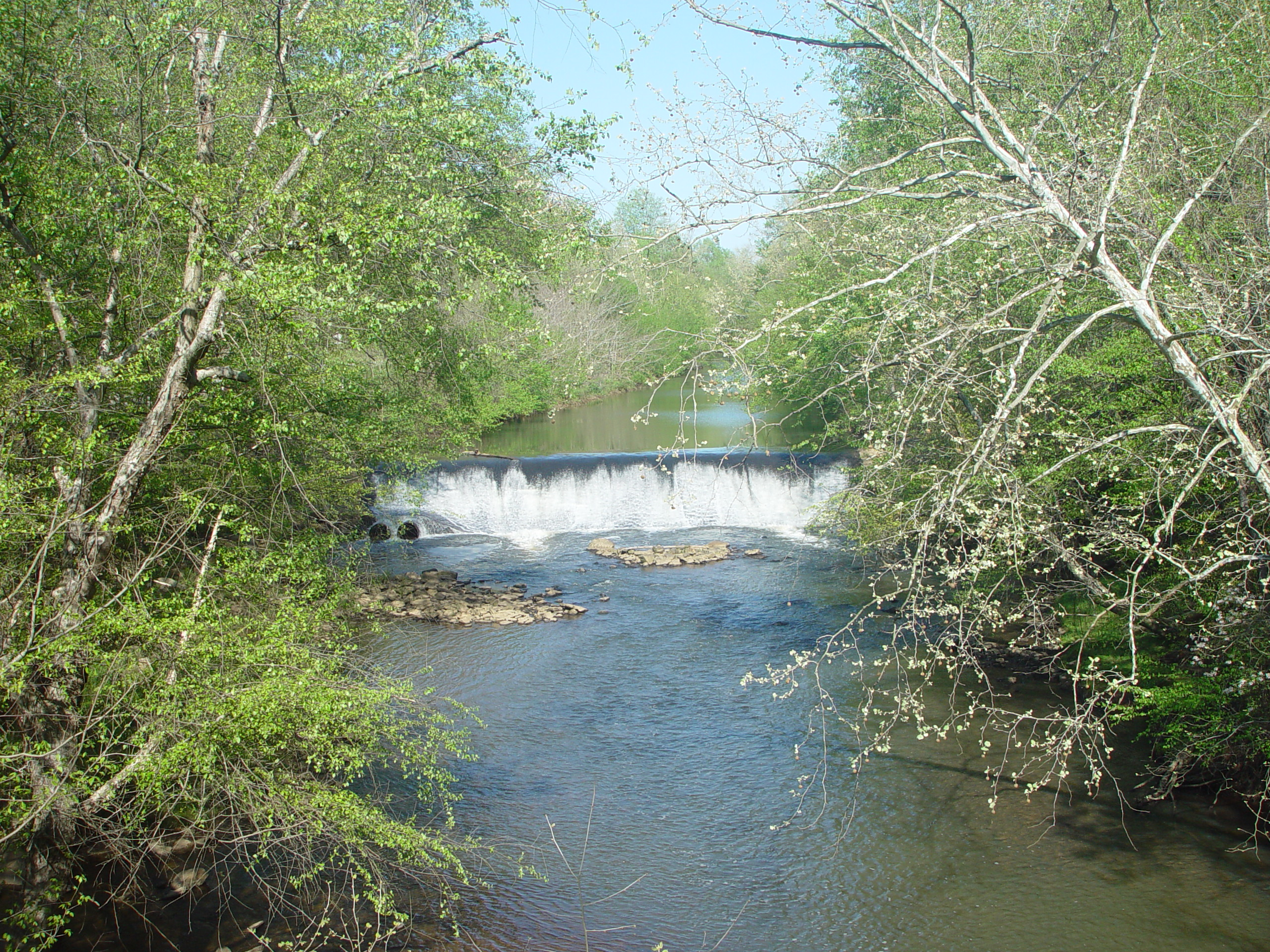
- Vickery Creek at entrance to the Chattahoochee River National Recreation Area, Roswell, Georgia

Physical characteristics
- Source
  - location: Southern part of Cumming, Georgia, just west of U.S. Route 19
  - coordinates: 34°11′25″N 84°08′32″W
  - elevation: 1,210 ft (370 m)
- Mouth
  - location: Chattahoochee River
  - coordinates: 34°00′18″N 84°20′57″W
  - elevation: 853 ft (260 m)

Big Creek or Vickery Creek is a 26.5-mile-long (42.6 km) stream in Forsyth and Fulton counties in Georgia. The creek mouth into the Chattahoochee River is located at the southern border of Roswell where State Route 9 crosses the river. Its source is located just north of the intersection of Georgia State Route 9 and Georgia State Route 20, in Forsyth County, about 1 mile (1.6 km) directly south of downtown Cumming.

Vickery Creek is named after a Cherokee woman named Sharlot Vickery who lived in present-day Roswell and owned much of the land around the creek. The creek was originally called Cedar Creek; however, the name was changed to Vickery some time after the arrival of Roswell King and his family in 1834.

The creek also became known as Big Creek at some point after the American Civil War.

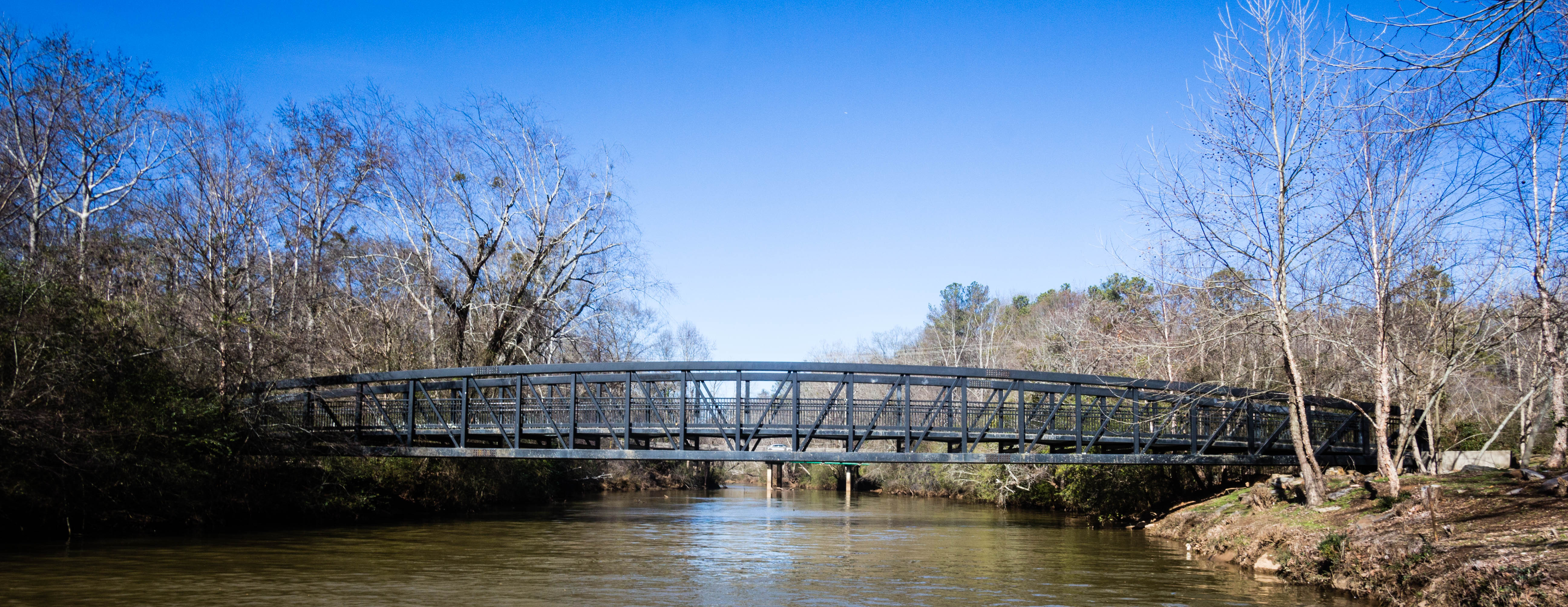
Mouth of Vickery Creek at Chattahoochee River, Roswell, Georgia

Much of the land east of the creek and west of Grimes Bridge Road in Roswell forms the Vickery Creek unit of the Chattahoochee River National Recreation Area. Upstream of a covered pedestrian bridge is a waterfall formed by a dam constructed to provide water for Roswell Mill. Big Creek Greenway is an under construction multi-use trail with two completed sections along Big Creek (formerly known as Vickery Creek). The creek has a history of flooding along the local bike path: the Greenway along Big Creek in Alpharetta near Mansell Road.

Hog Wallow Creek is a major tributary that enters in Roswell, just north of the Chattahoochee River.
