= Roswell =

Roswell may refer to:

- Roswell incident
- Roswell, New Mexico, known for the purported 1947 UFO incident (see other uses below)

== Places in the United States ==
- Roswell, Colorado, a former settlement now part of Colorado Springs
- Roswell, Georgia, a suburb of Atlanta
- Roswell, Idaho
- Roswell, Ohio
- Roswell, South Dakota

== People ==
- Roswell Beebe (1795–1856), American railroad executive; mayor of Little Rock, Arkansas
- Roswell L. Colt (1779–1856), American businessman
- Roswell Farnham (1827–1903), Governor of Vermont
- Roswell Field (1807–1869), American lawyer, politician
- Roswell P. Flower (1835–1899), US congressman, and Governor of New York
- Roswell Gilpatric (1906–1996), American lawyer and politician
- Roswell G. Horr (1830–1896), American politician
- Roswell King (1765–1844) was an American businessman, planter and industrialist
- Roswell Park (surgeon) (1852–1914), American physician
- Roswell A. Parmenter (1821–1904), New York politician
- Roswell B. Rexford, Michigan politician
- Roswell S. Ripley (1823–1887), Confederate Army general
- Roswell Rudd (1935–2017), American musician
- Roswell Weston (1774–1861), New York politician and judge
- Roswell Williams, pseudonym of Frank Owen (author) (1893–1968), American novelist
- Maggie Roswell (born 1952), American actress

== In culture and fiction ==
- Roswell High, a young adults book series written by Melinda Metz
  - Roswell (TV series), a 1999 TV series about a group of aliens
  - Roswell, New Mexico (TV series), a 2019 TV series about a group of aliens
- Roswell Conspiracies: Aliens, Myths and Legends, an (1999-2000) animated series by BKN
- Roswell (film), a 1994 television film about the Roswell UFO incident, sometimes called Roswell: The UFO Cover-up
- Stargate SG-1: Roswell, a 2007 novel by Sonny Whitelaw and Jennifer Fallon
- Roswell, Little Green Man, a comic book series
- "Roswell That Ends Well", an episode of Futurama
- Roswell, Texas, a serialized, online graphic novel
- Roswell Records, a record label founded by Dave Grohl of the Foo Fighters
- There is also the Roswell Saves the World book which hosts the Roswell incident as Grays crashing

== Other ==
- Roswell High School (New Mexico), a school in Roswell, New Mexico
- Roswell High School (Georgia), a school in the city of Roswell, Georgia
- Roswell International Air Center, an airport in Roswell, New Mexico
- Roswell springsnail, a species of freshwater snails
- Roswell Park Comprehensive Cancer Center, a cancer hospital in Buffalo, New York
- Roswell Recreation and Parks, a municipal department in Roswell, Georgia

== See also ==
- Roswell High School (disambiguation)
