= Roswall =

Environmental art mosaic project in Georgia

RosWall
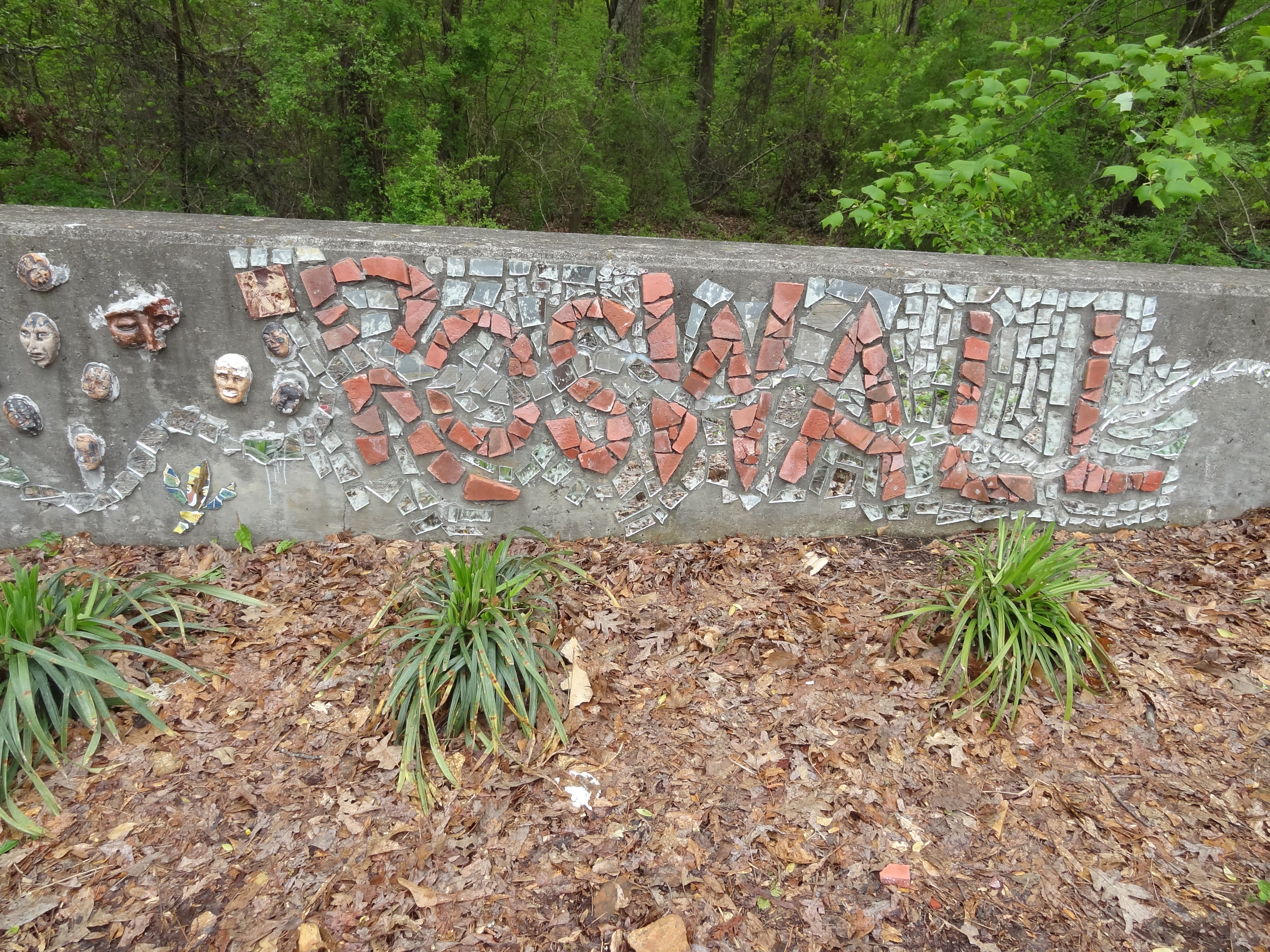
- RosWall (far right section)
- Type: Mosaic
- Location: Roswell, Georgia, United States; 34°1′19.53″N 84°21′26.17″W

RosWall (2008) is an environmental art mosaic project located in Roswell, Georgia, United States, a northern suburb of the state capital of Atlanta.

The mosaic runs approximately 150 feet and began on a small portion of the wall and has continued to grow with the help of local groups including students of the nearby The Cottage School and local mosaic artist Donna Pinter.

== Detailed views ==
Additional views of RosWall

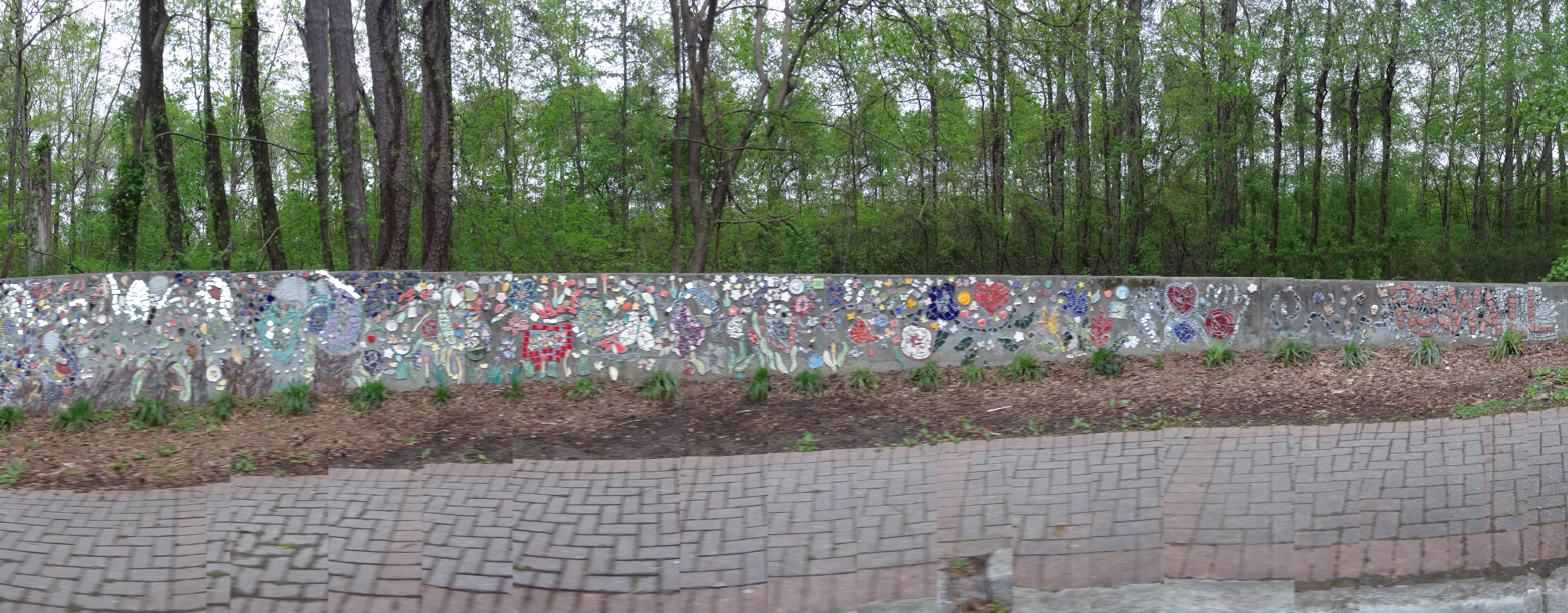
Panoramic view of RosWall

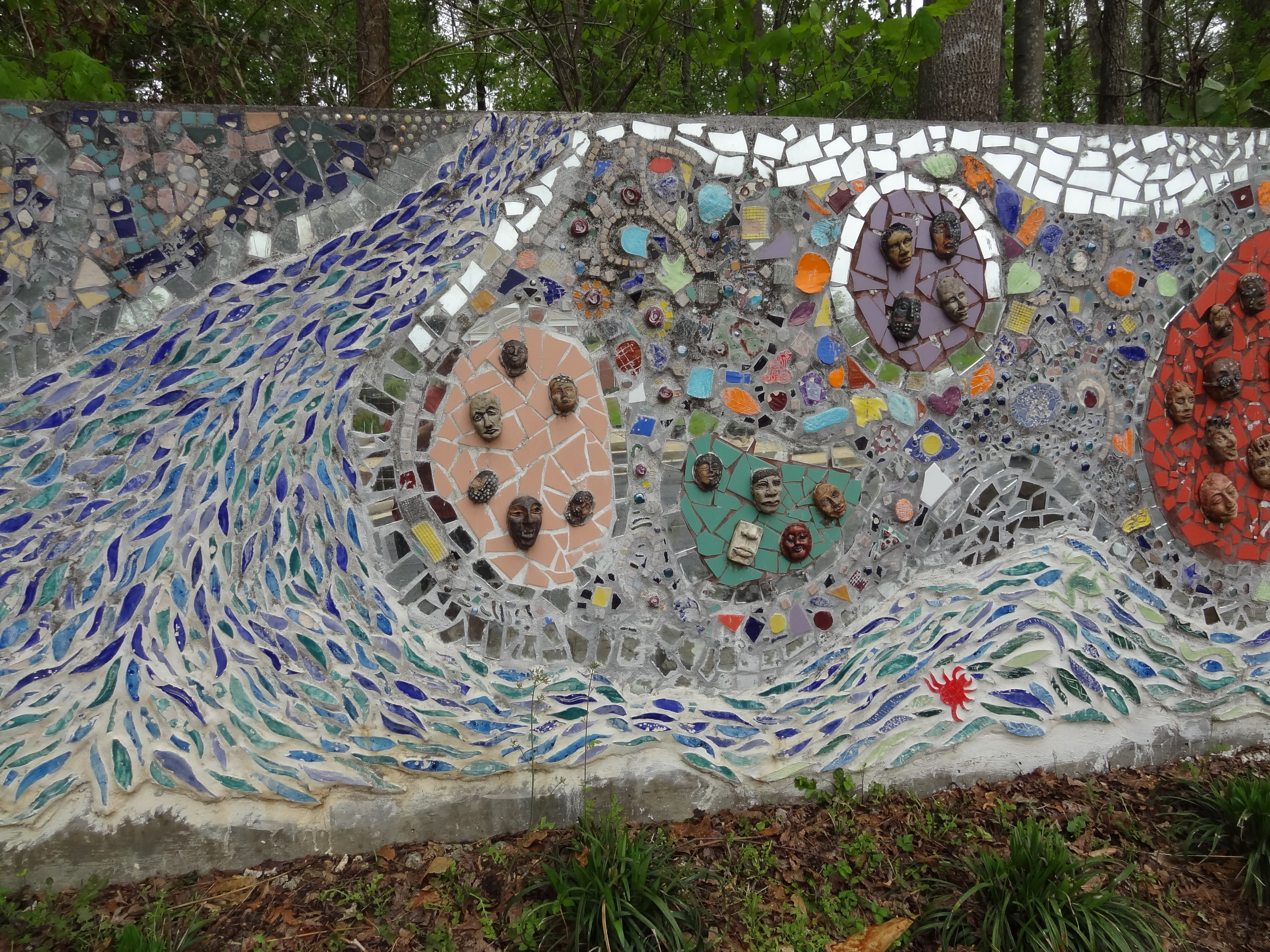
Detailed view of a portion of RosWall

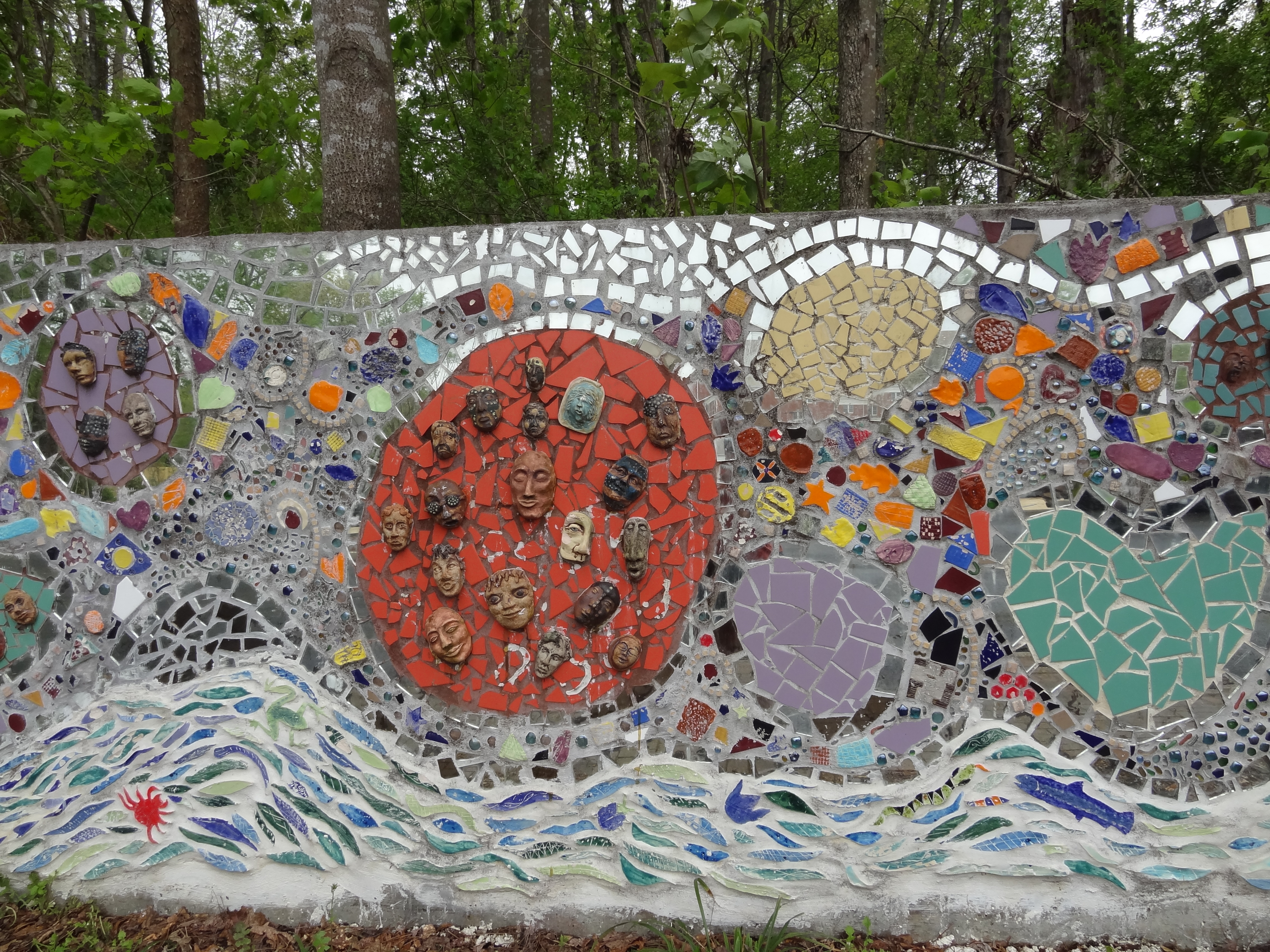
Detailed view of a portion of RosWall

== See also ==
- Symphony of Color
