= Roswell Recreation and Parks =

Municipal department in Roswell, Georgia, United States

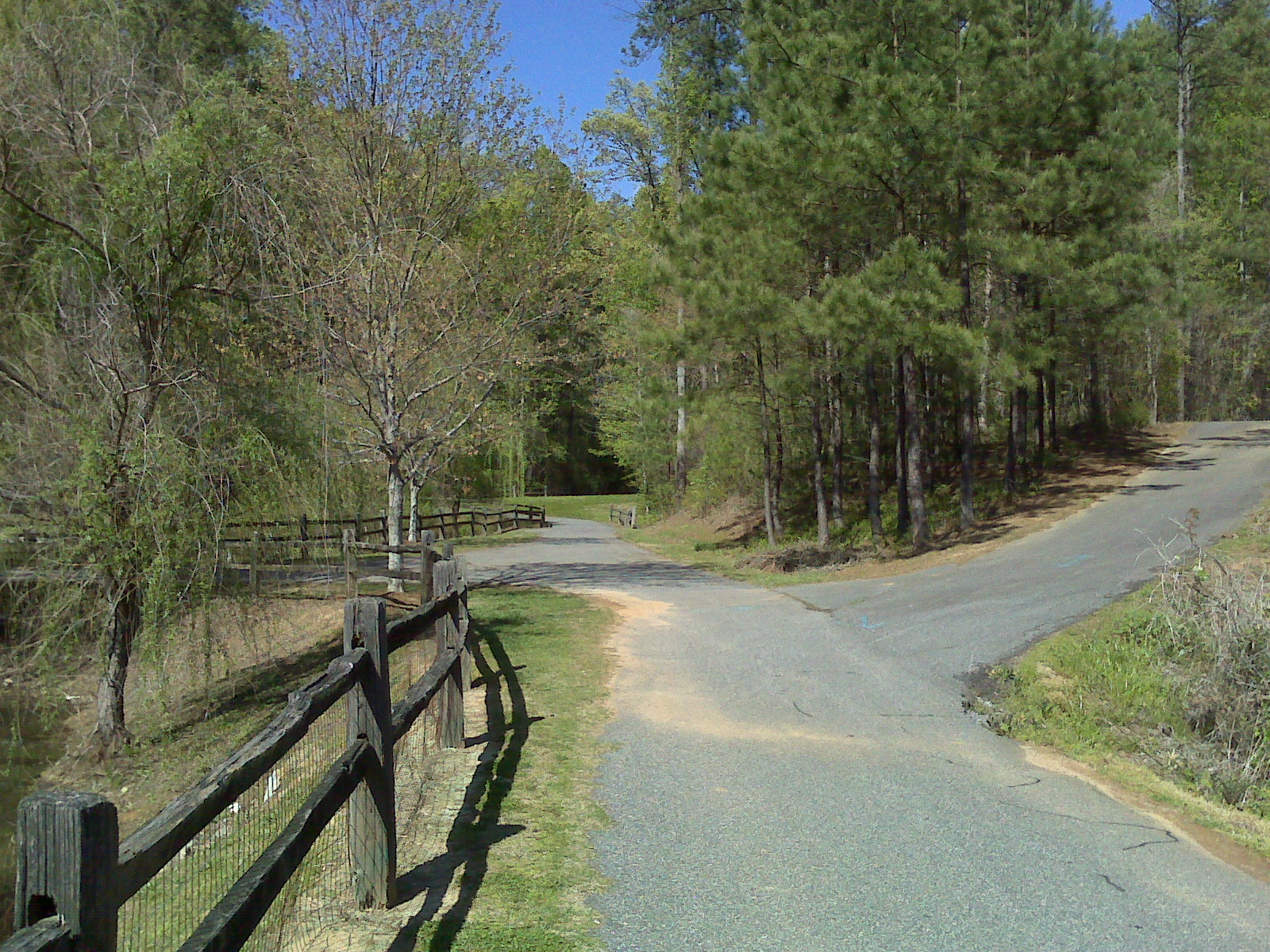
- Trails at the East Roswell Park Unit of the Roswell Recreation and Parks System
- Interactive map of Roswell Recreation and Parks
- Location: Roswell, Fulton County, GA
- Coordinates: 34°1′21.0″N 84°21′36.4″W
- Area: over 900 acres (364.22 ha; 1.41 sq mi)
- Owner: City of Roswell
- Operator: Roswell Recreation and Parks Dept.
- Open: Open all year
- Awards: NRPA Gold Medal Award Finalist; CAPRA Accredited
- Camp sites: Hembree Road Park
- Website: City of Roswell Website

The Roswell Recreation and Parks is a municipal department serving the city of Roswell, Georgia. It oversees eight public-use parks covering over 900 acres and sponsors over 25 athletic programs ranging from soccer, football, basketball, baseball, and swimming for all age groups. It has been recognized as one of the top civic recreation programs in the United States. The Roswell Recreations Department also works closely with local middle and high schools by providing practice fields.

== Recognition and awards ==
Roswell's Recreation and Parks department has twice been awarded a silver medal by the National Recreation and Park Association (NRPA). The Roswell Rec is one of only seven agencies in Georgia and 116 in the United States to be accredited by the Commission for Accreditation of Park and Recreation Agencies (CAPRA).

== Events ==
Roswell Arts Festival
Roswell Remembers Memorial Day Celebration
Roswell Roots Festival
Roswell Youth Day Parade
Roswell Youth Lacrosse Invitational
Trolley Crawl

== Park trails ==
Allenbrook Trail
Willeo Trail

== Park units ==
East Roswell Park

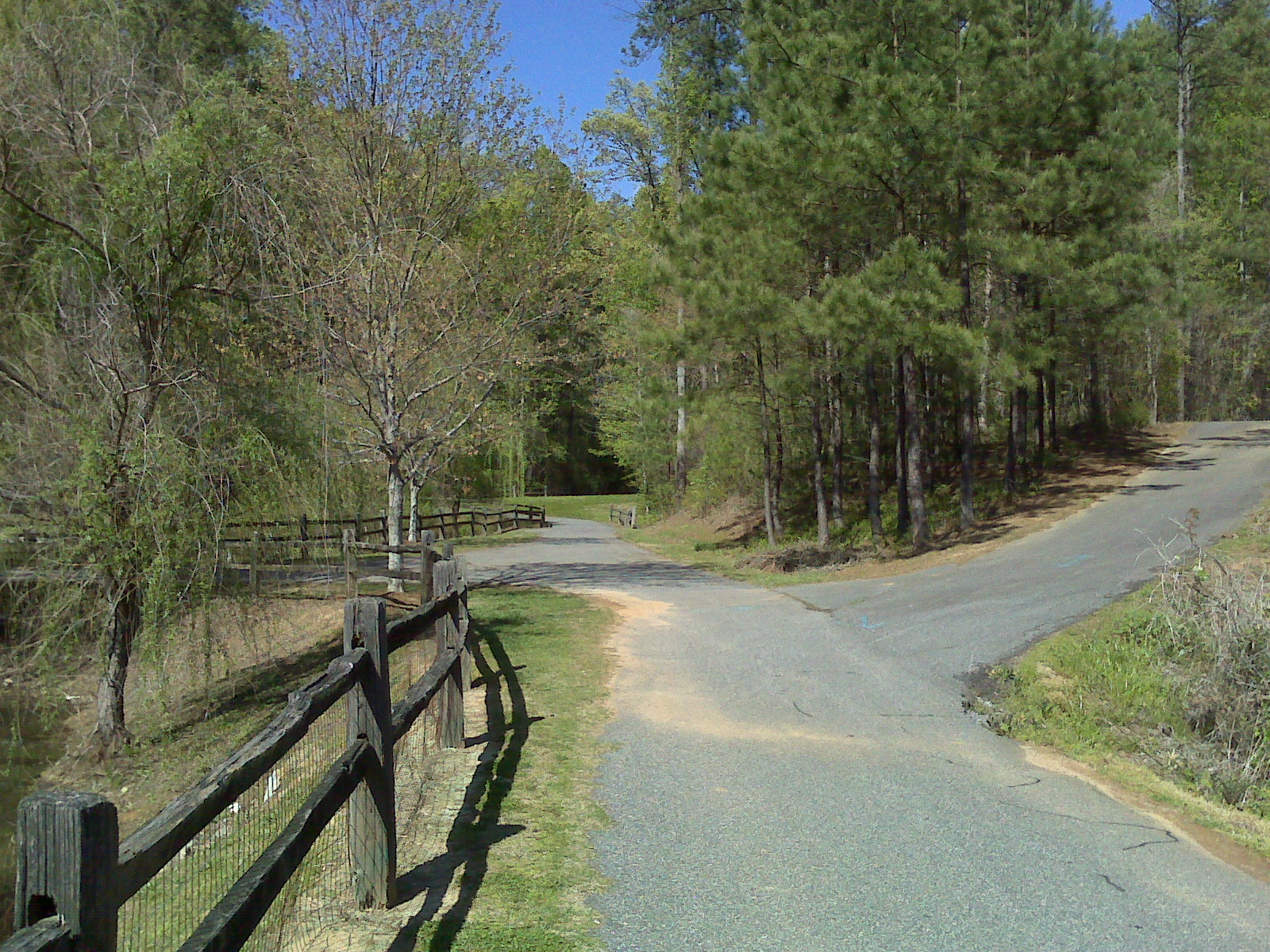
Trails at East Roswell Park

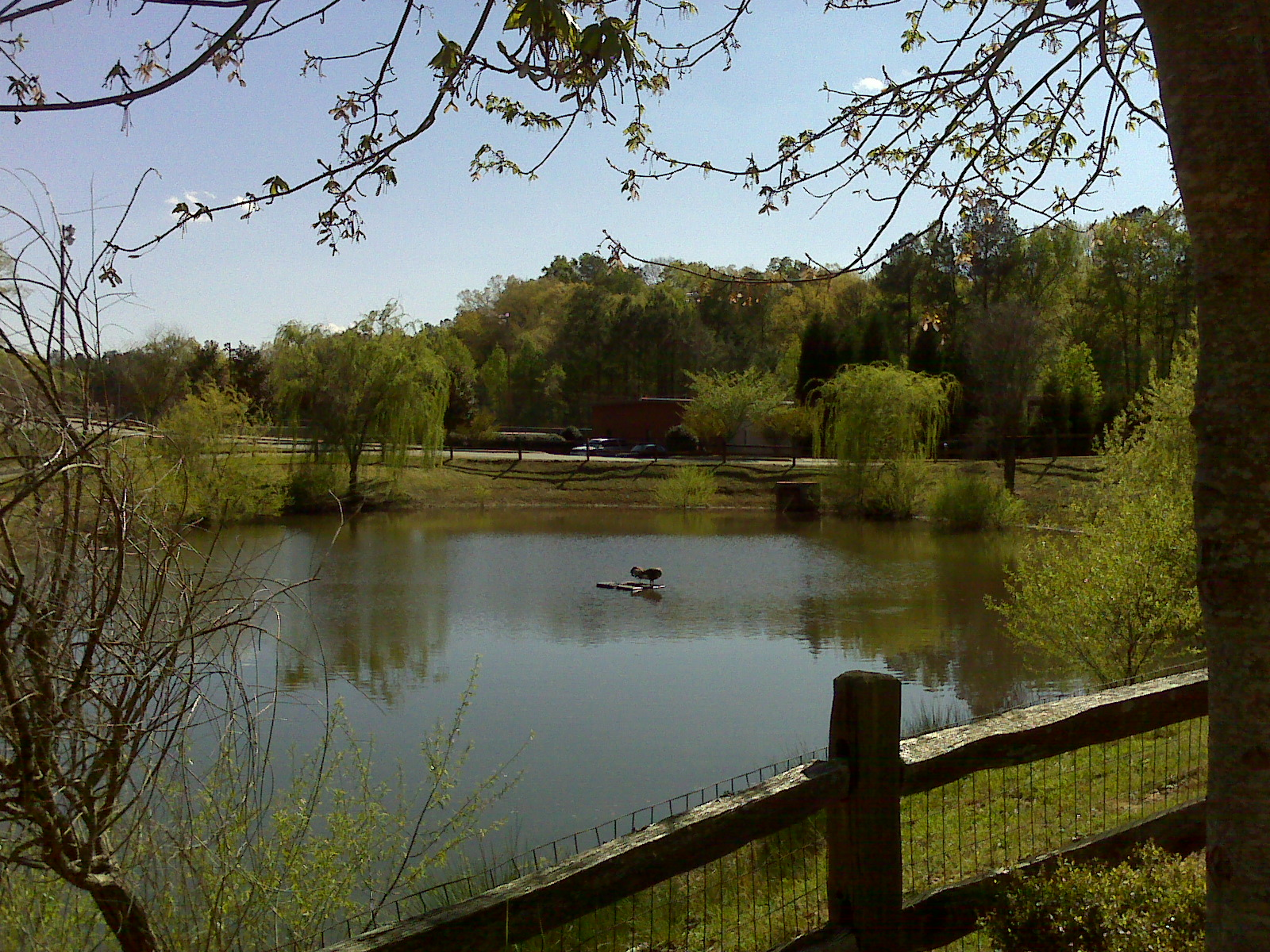
Lake at East Roswell Park
Grimes Bridge Park

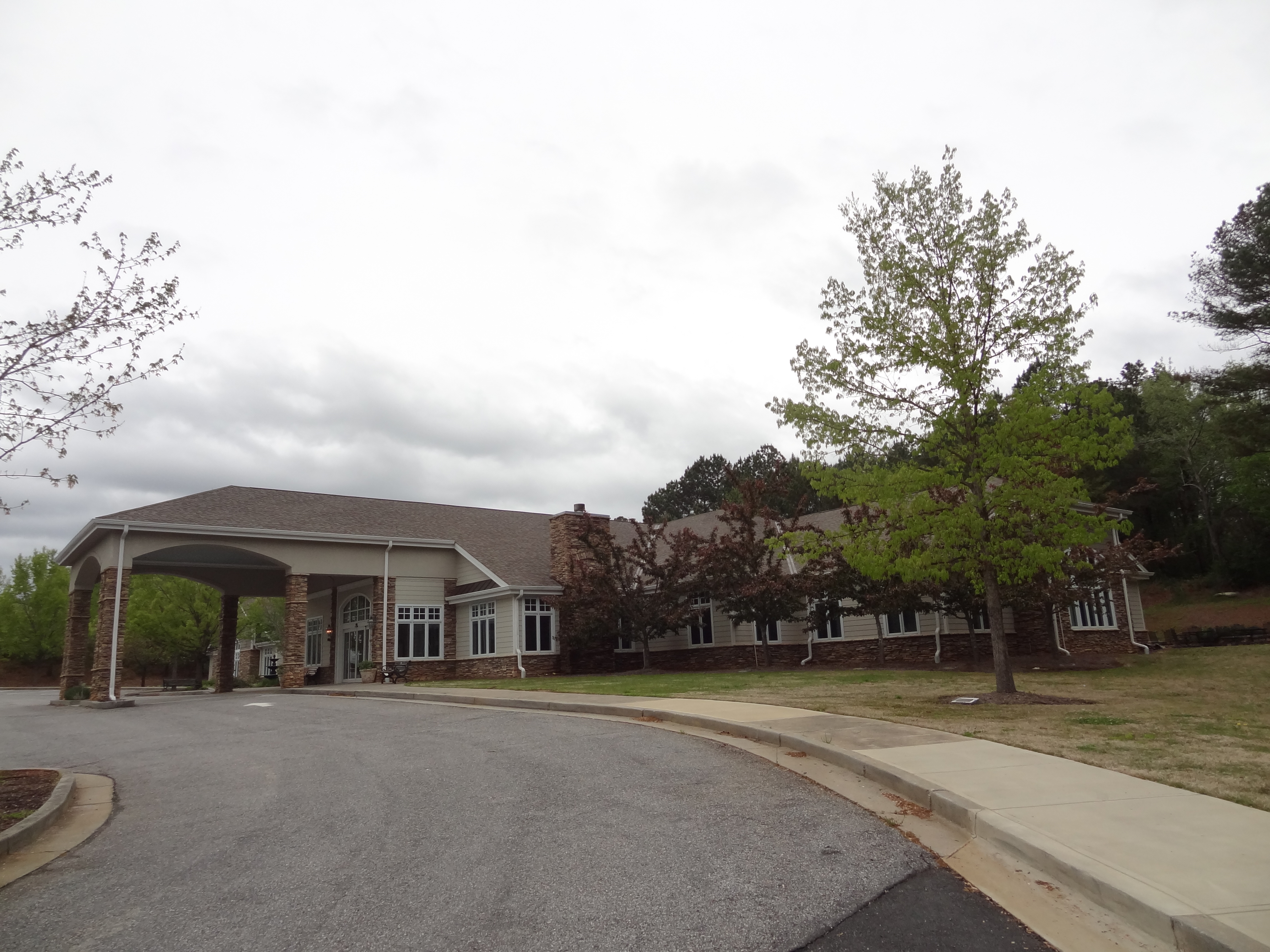
Adult Recreation Center

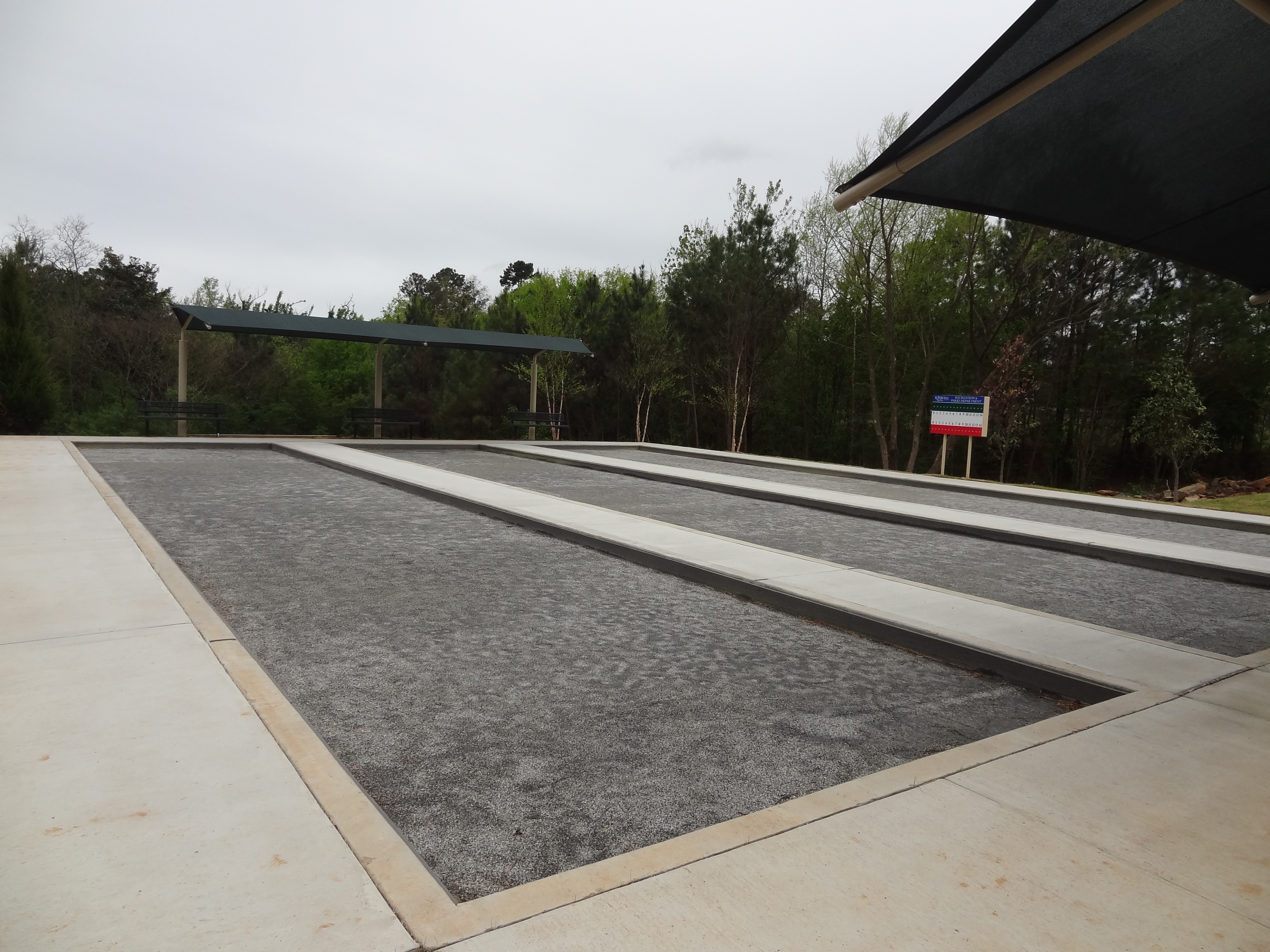
Bocce Ball Court

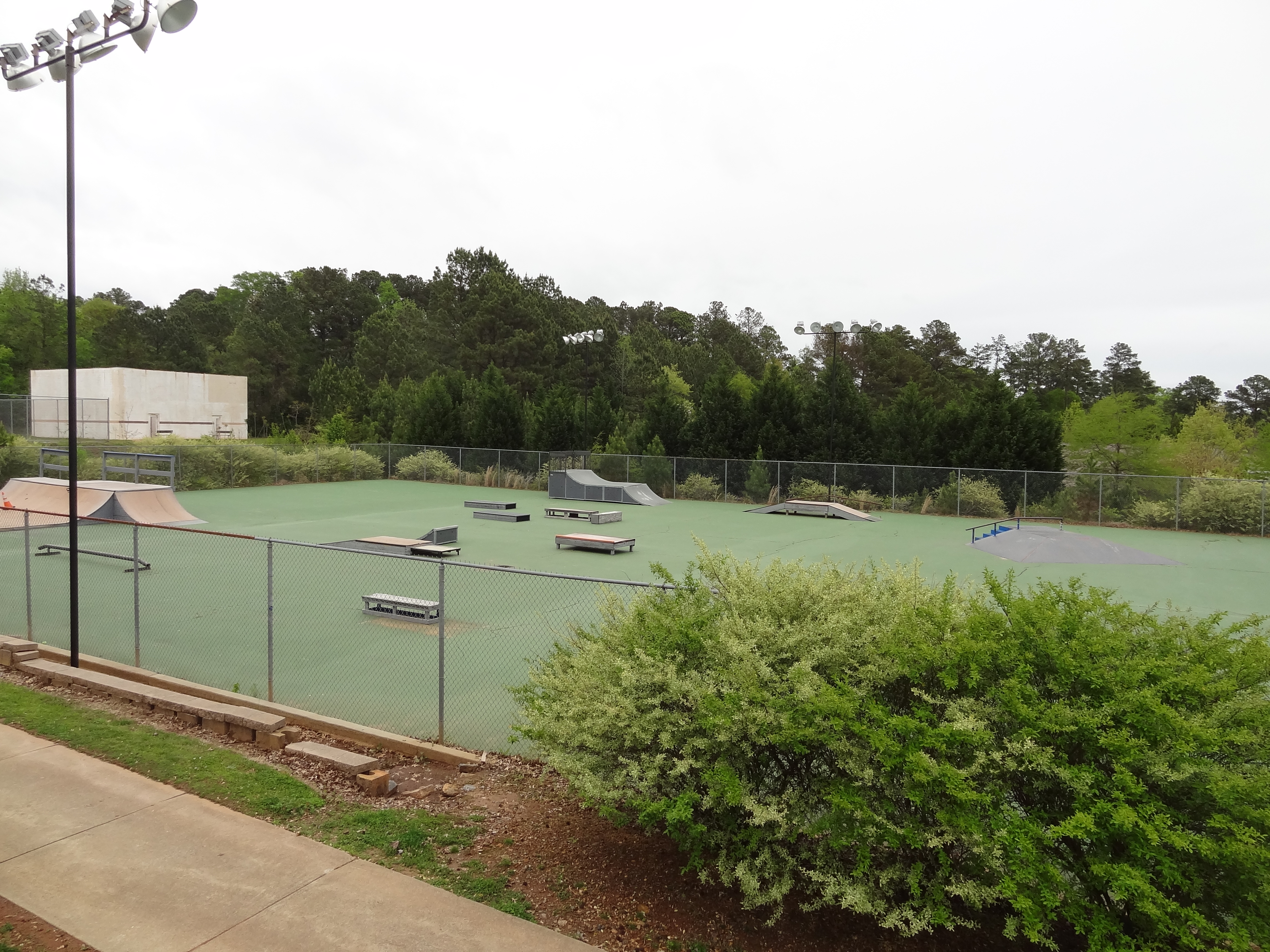
Skate Park
Roswell Area Park

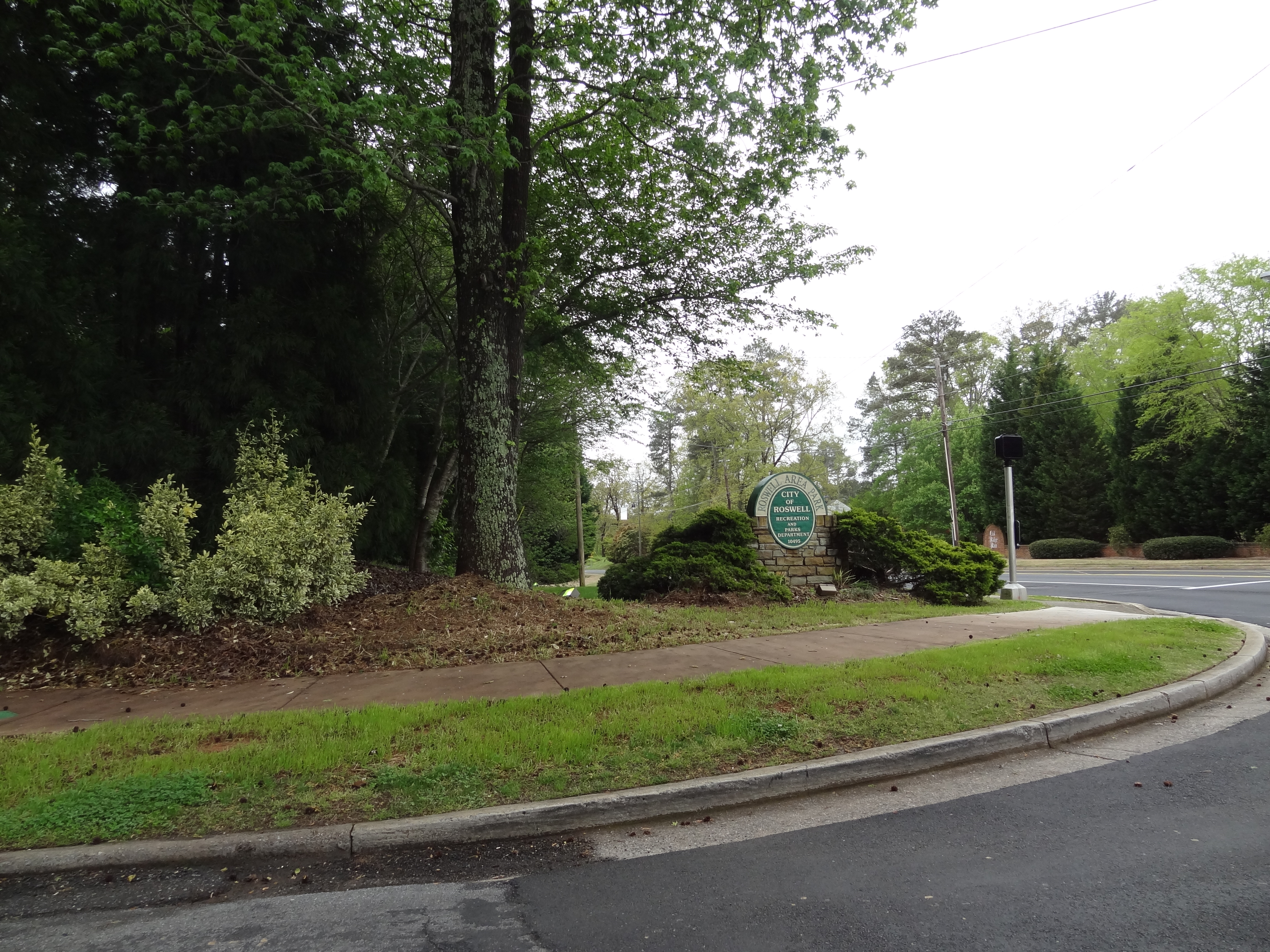
Entrance sign to park

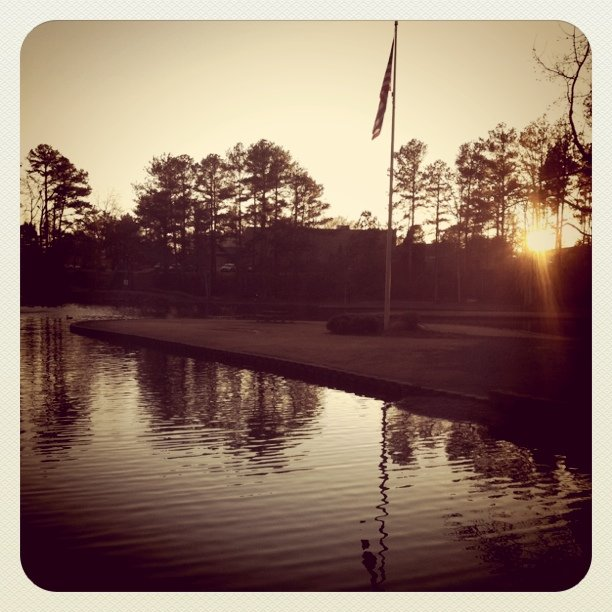
Pond at park

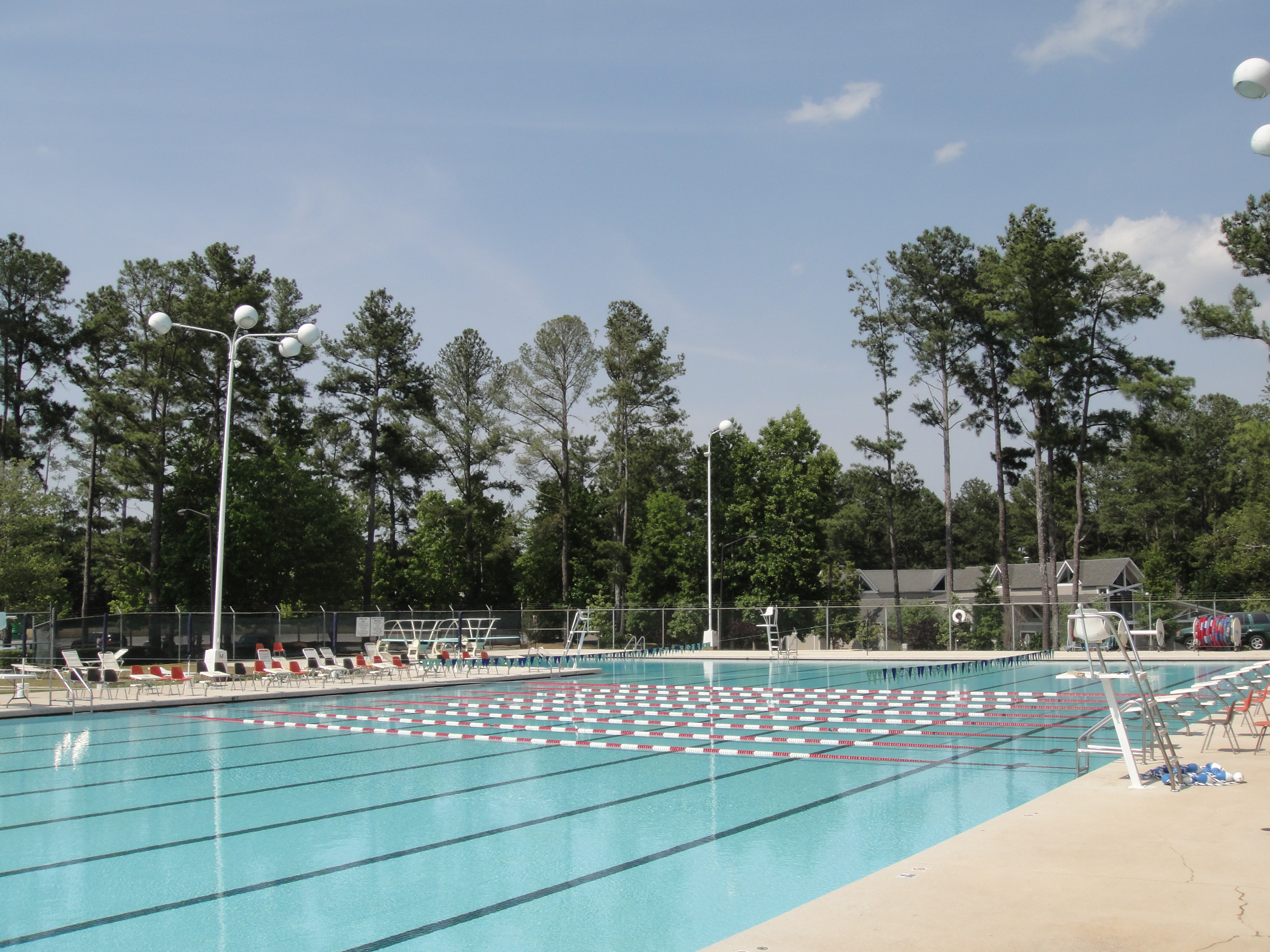
Olympic-size pool

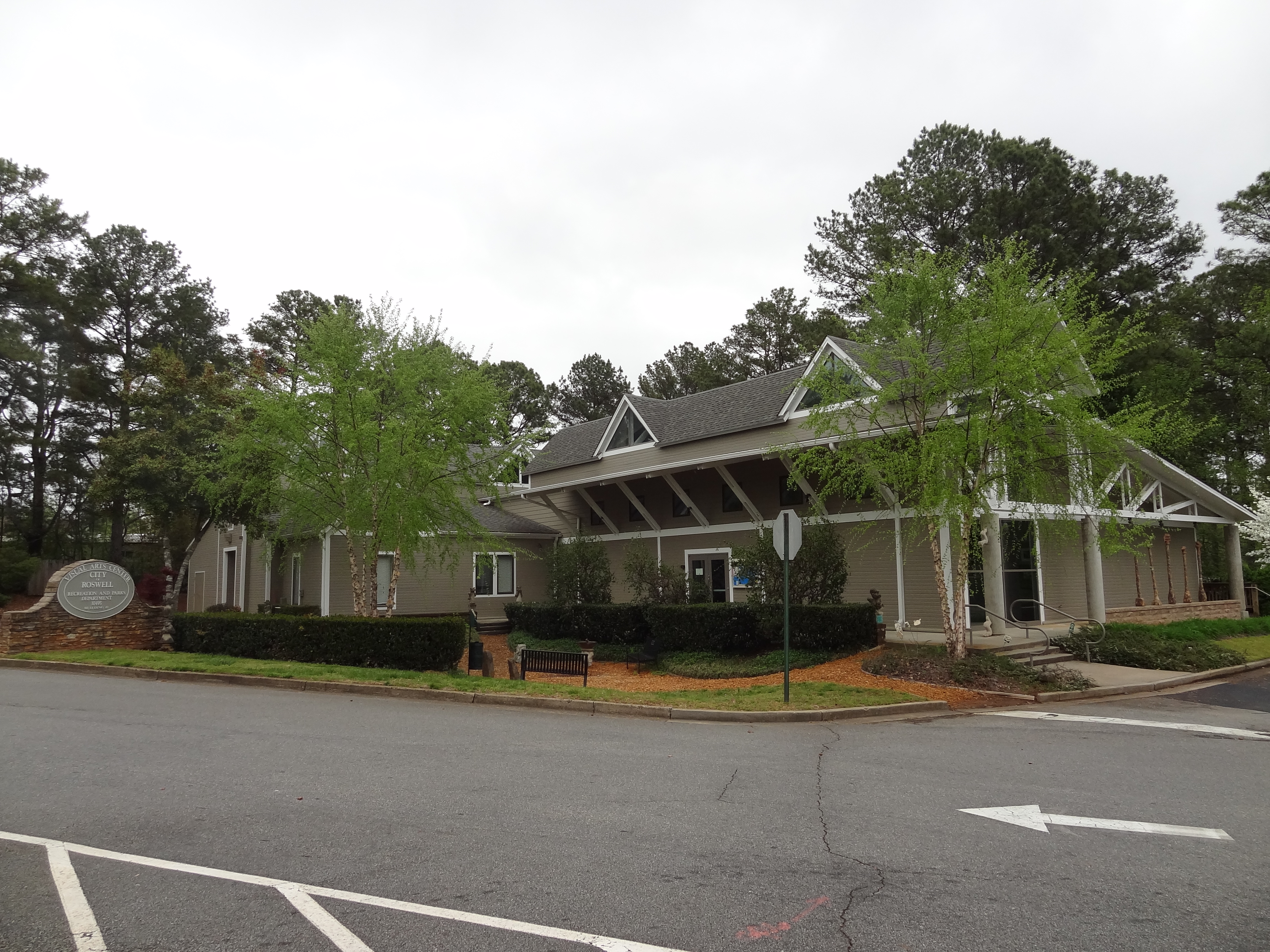
Visual Arts Center

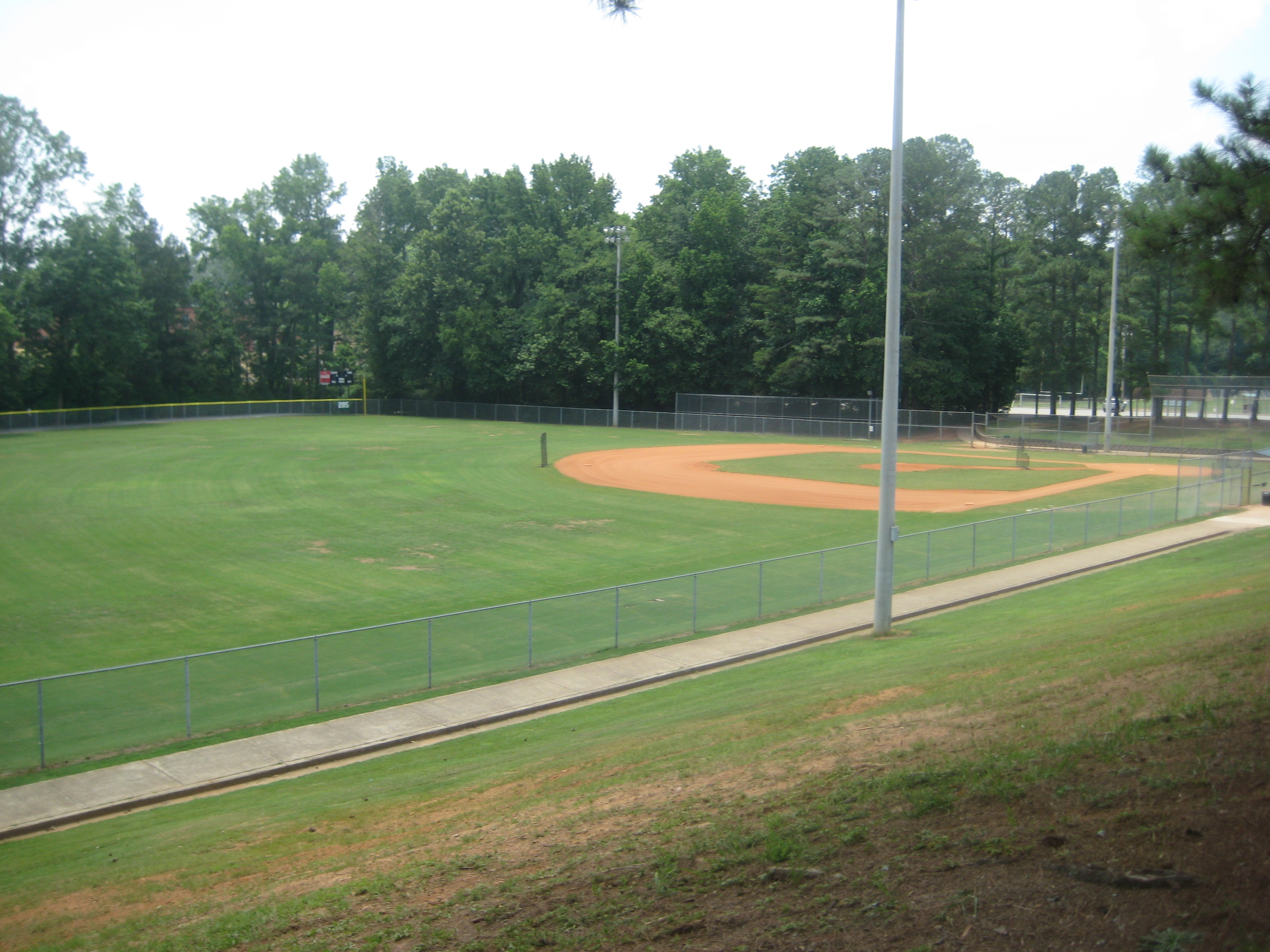
Baseball Field

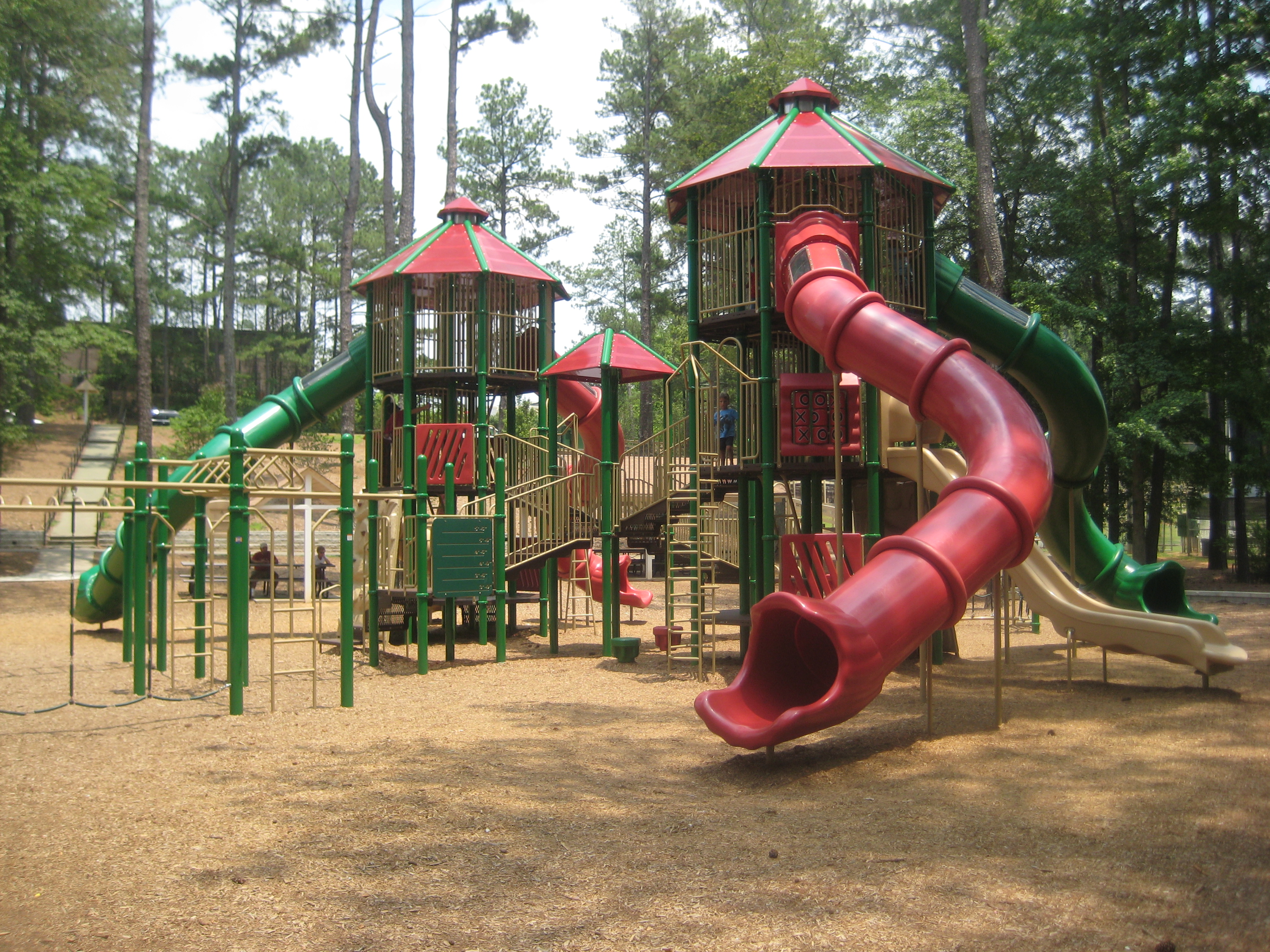
Playground

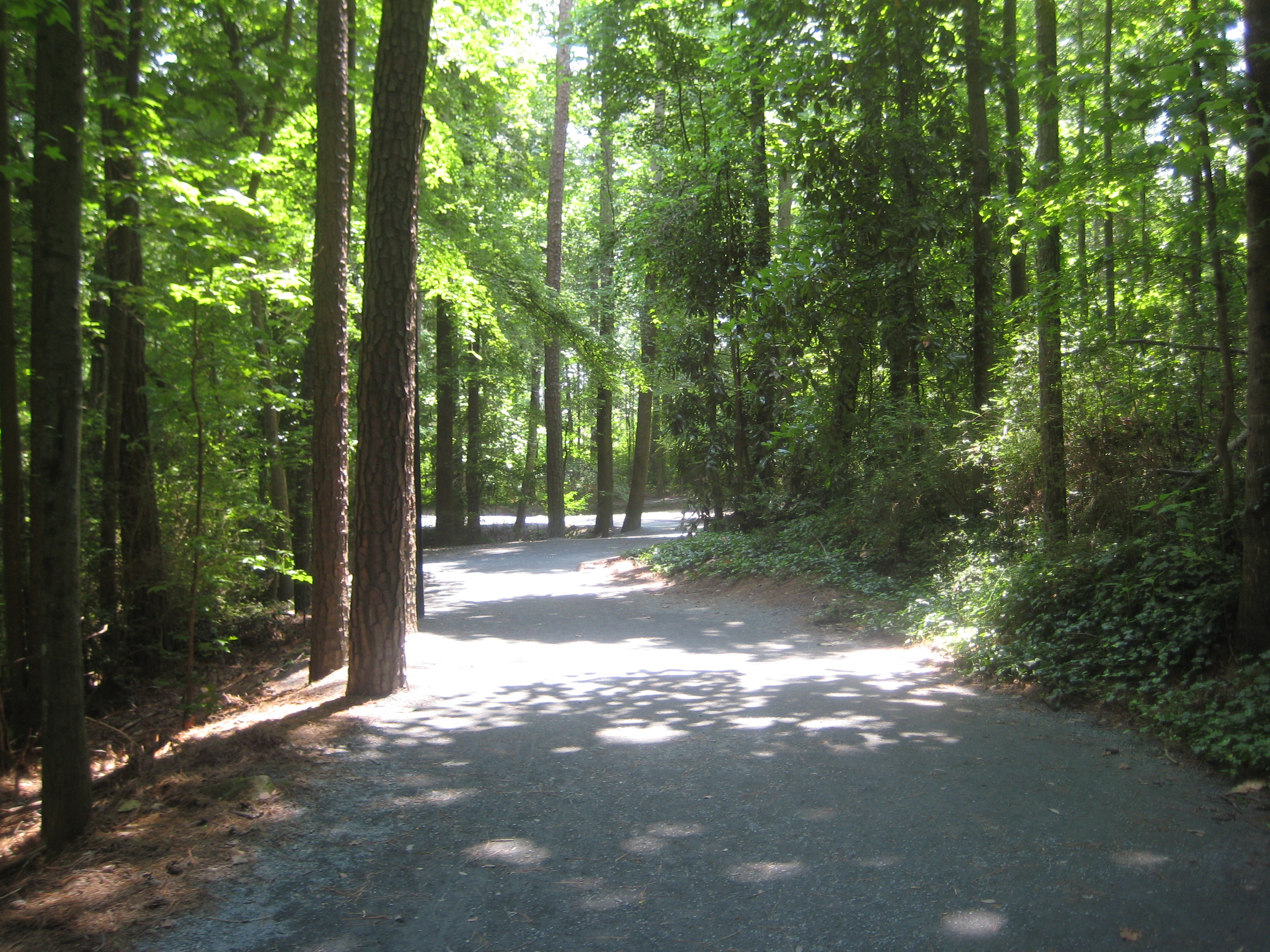
Walking/running trail
Waller Park

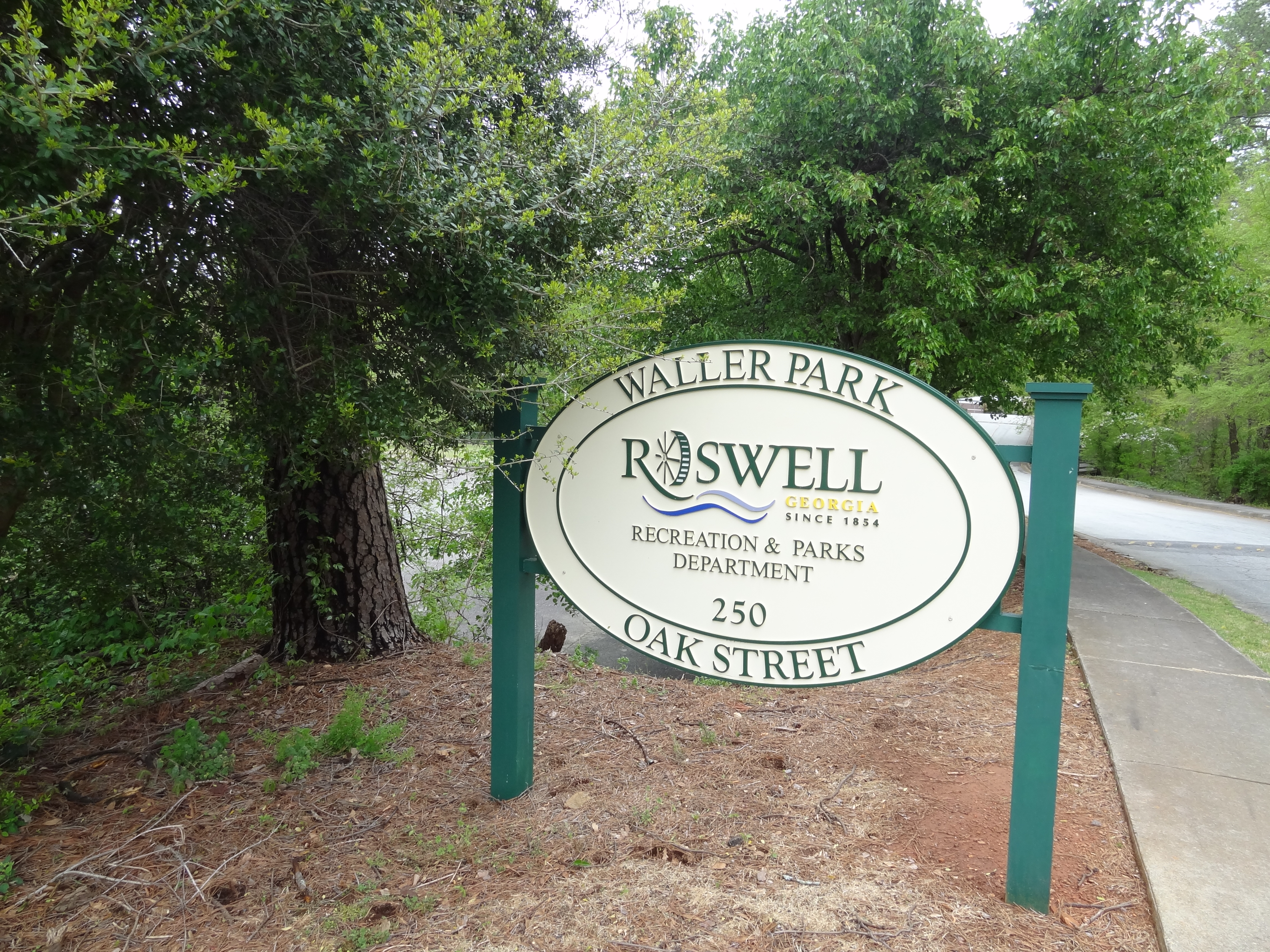
Waller Park Entrance

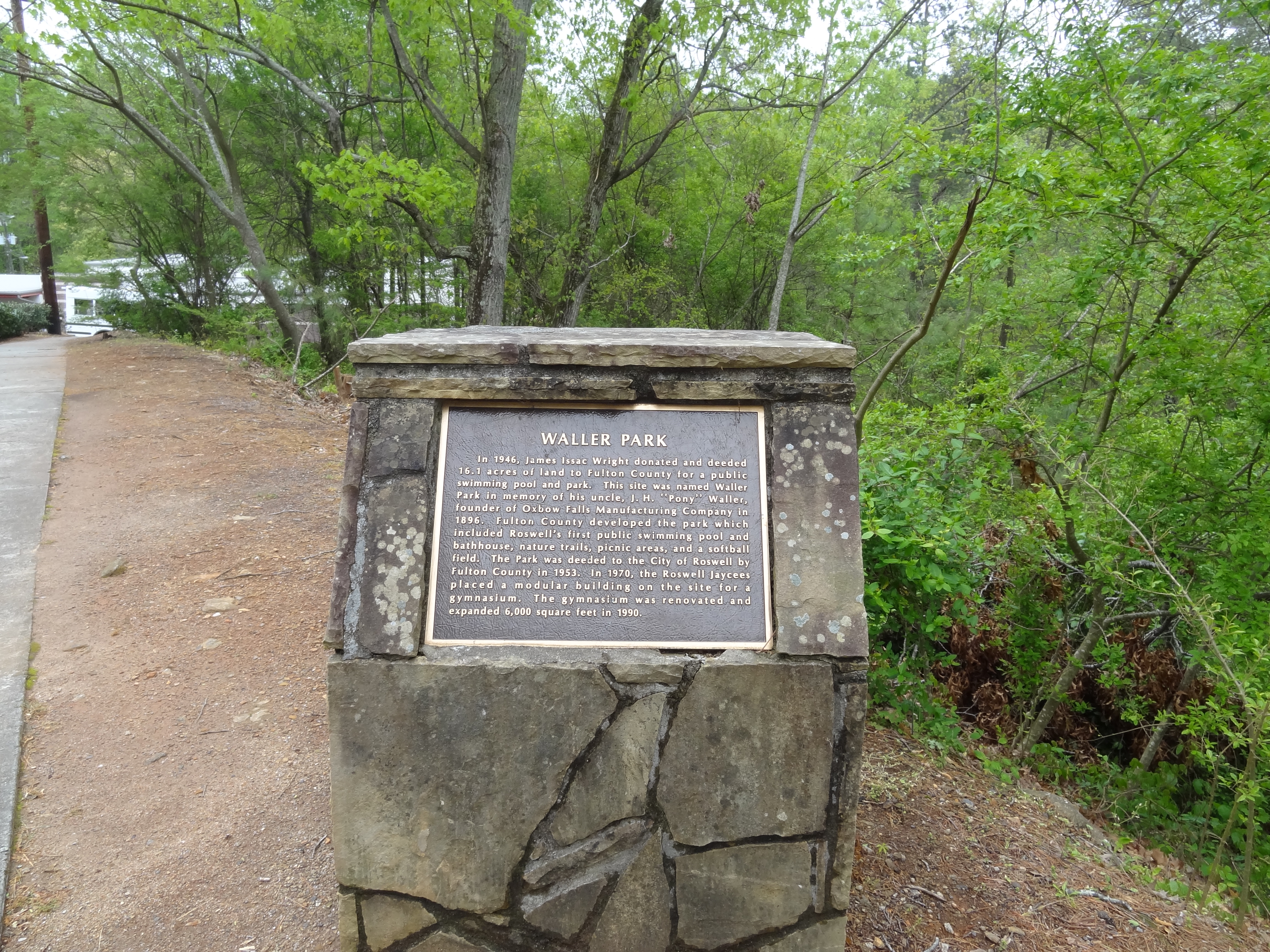
Waller Park Historical Marker

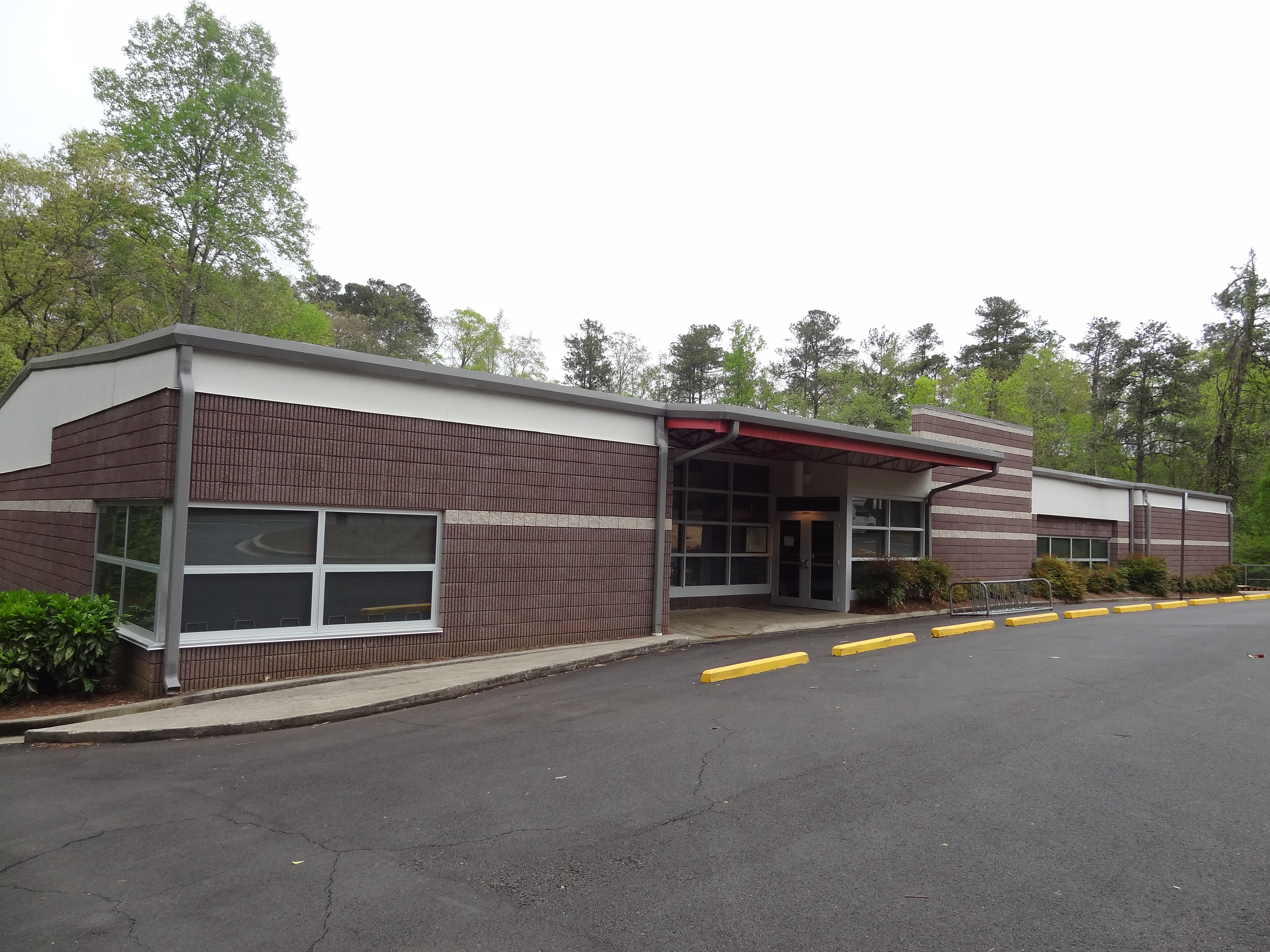
Waller Park Building and Gym

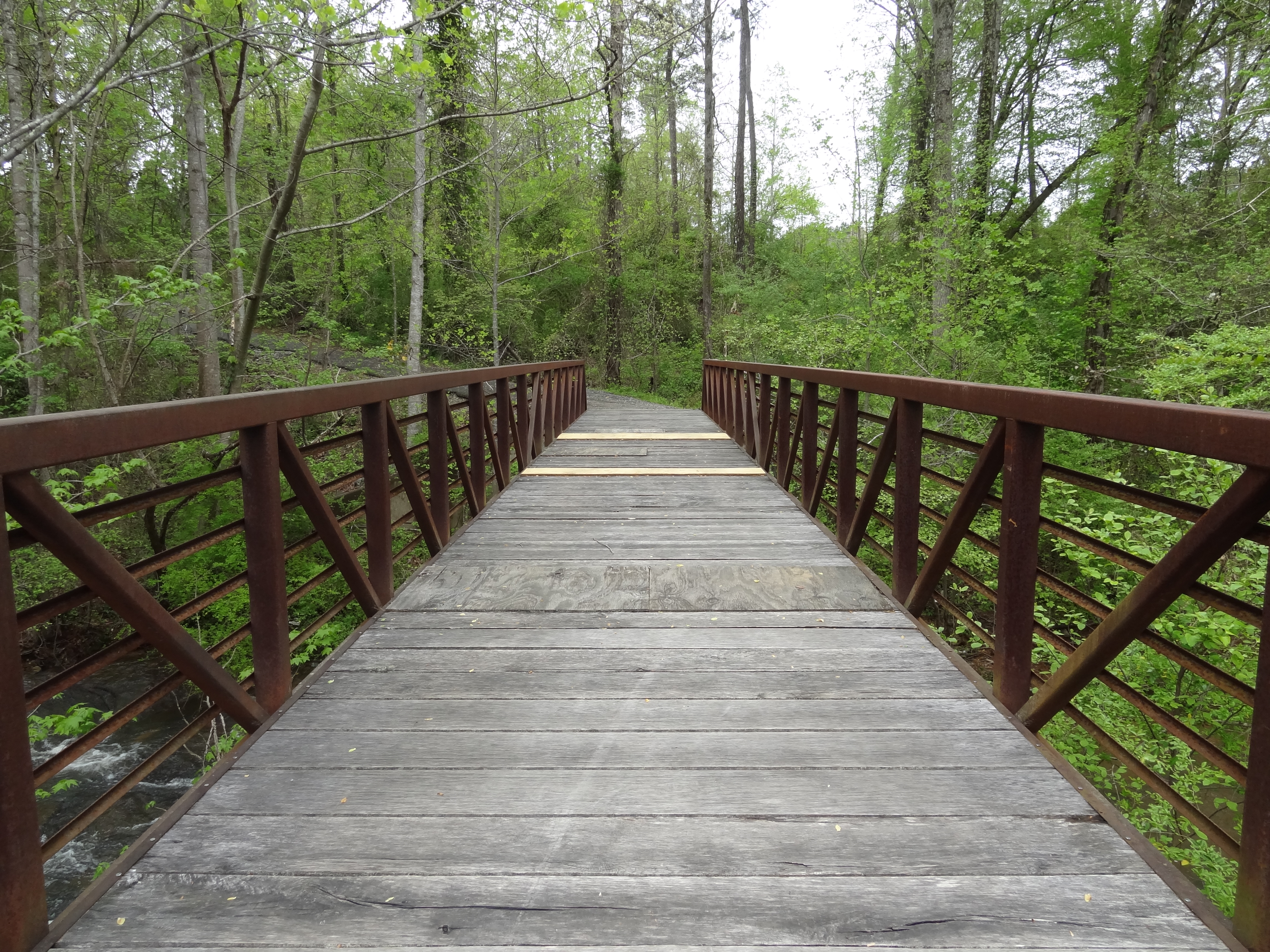
Bridge connecting Waller Park with Grimes Bridge Road Extension

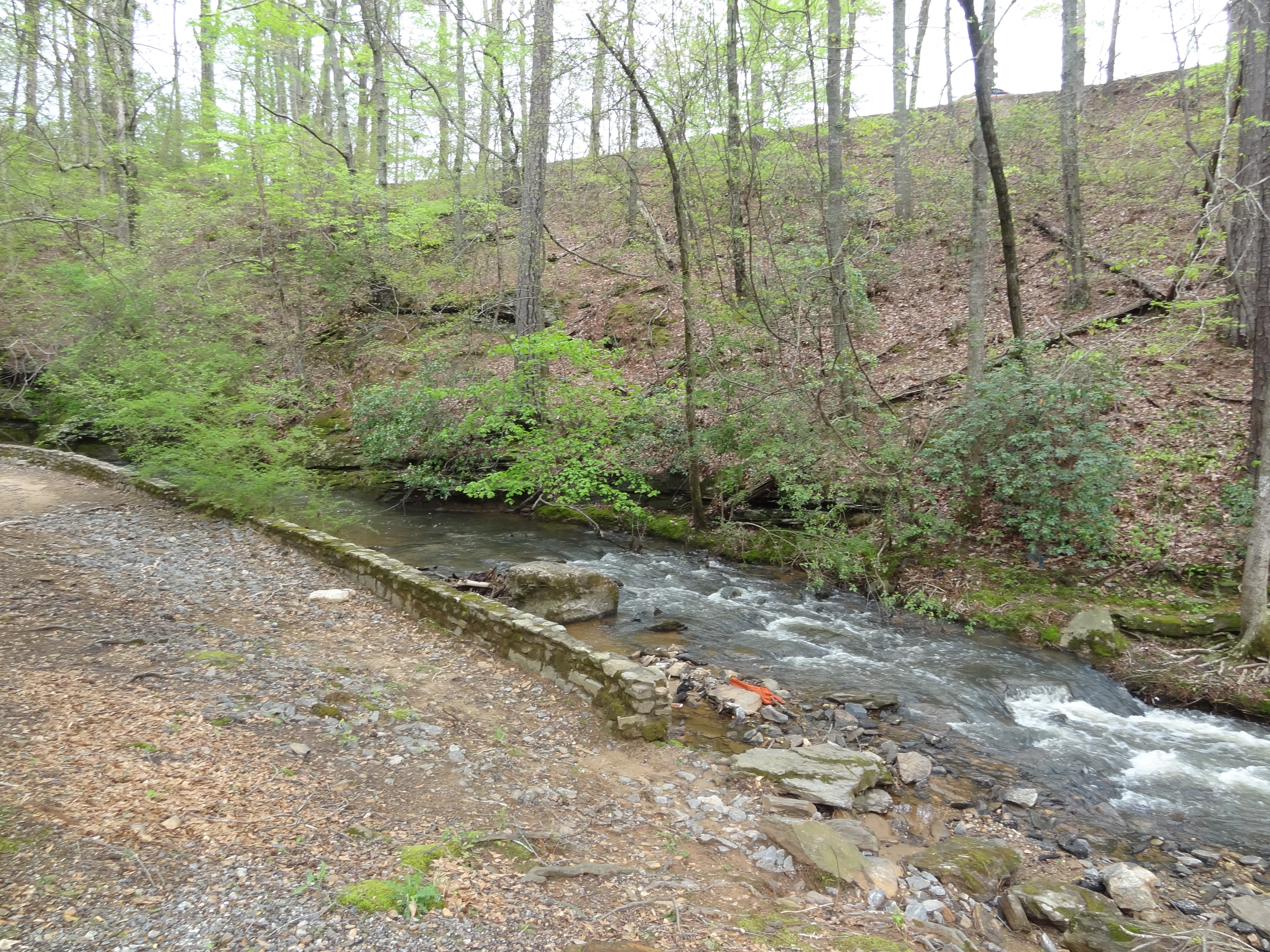
Hog Waller Creek behind Waller Park

Azalea Park
Big Creek Park
Don White Memorial Park
East Roswell Park
Garrard Landing Park
Grimes Bridge Park
Hembree Road Park
Leita Thompson Memorial Park
Old Mill Park
Riverside Park
Roswell Area Park
Sweet Apple Park
Waller Park
Waller Park Extension
Willeo Park

== Major athletic programs ==
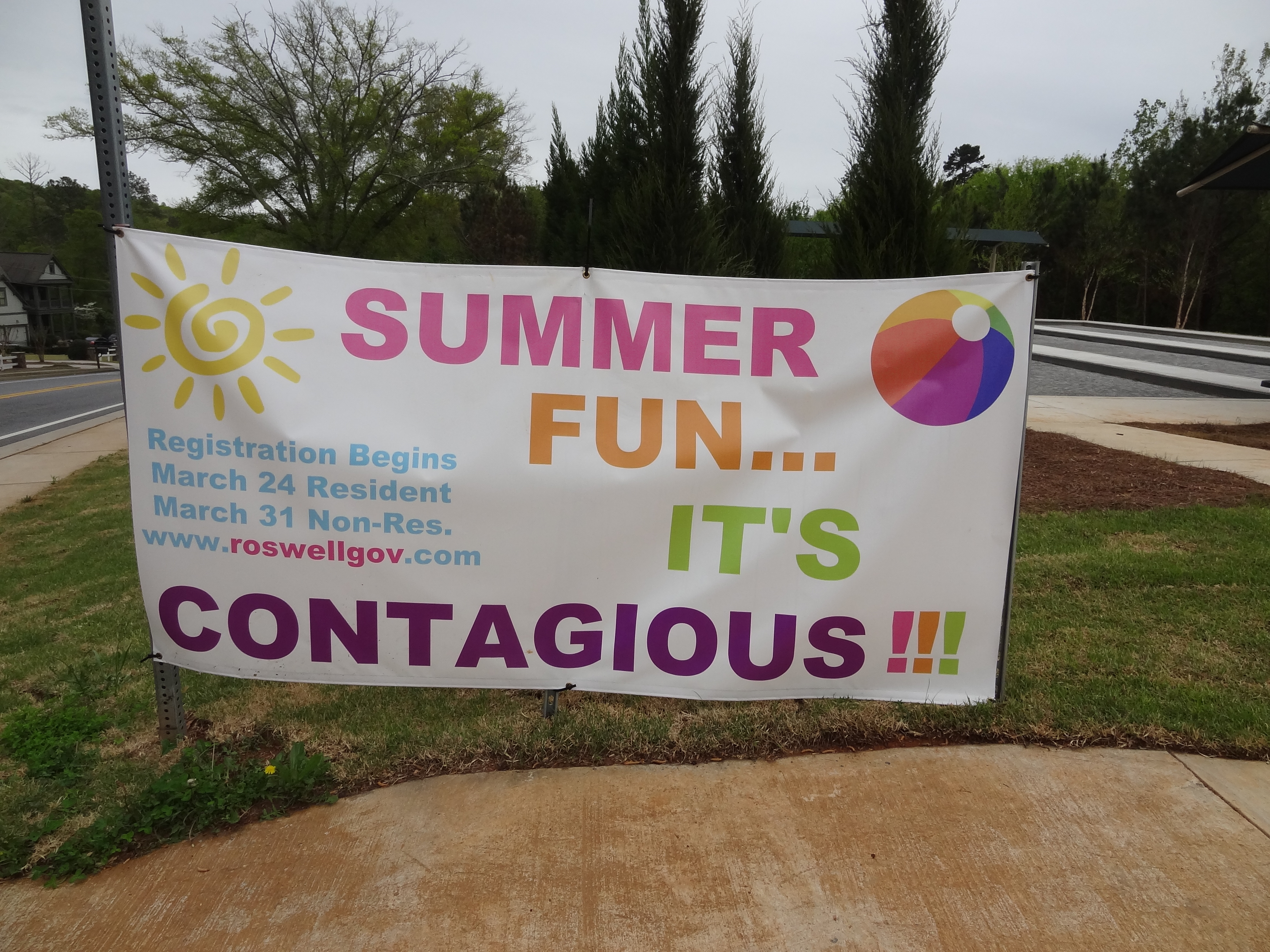
Summer Fun Program Banner

=== Fall programs ===
Performing Arts
Gymnastics
Youth Baseball
Youth Basketball
Youth Football
Youth Softball (Fast pitch and slow pitch)
Adult Basketball
Adult Baseball
Adult Softball

=== Spring programs ===
Performing Arts
Gymnastics
Youth Soccer
Youth Tennis
Youth Swimming
Teen League Basketball
Adult Soccer
Adult Tennis

=== Summer programs ===
Youth swim team (Roswell Rapids)
Youth dive team (Roswell Rapids)
Adult swim team

== See also ==
- Roswell, Georgia
- Chattahoochee River National Recreation Area
