= Faces of War Memorial =

Public memorial in Roswell, Georgia, US

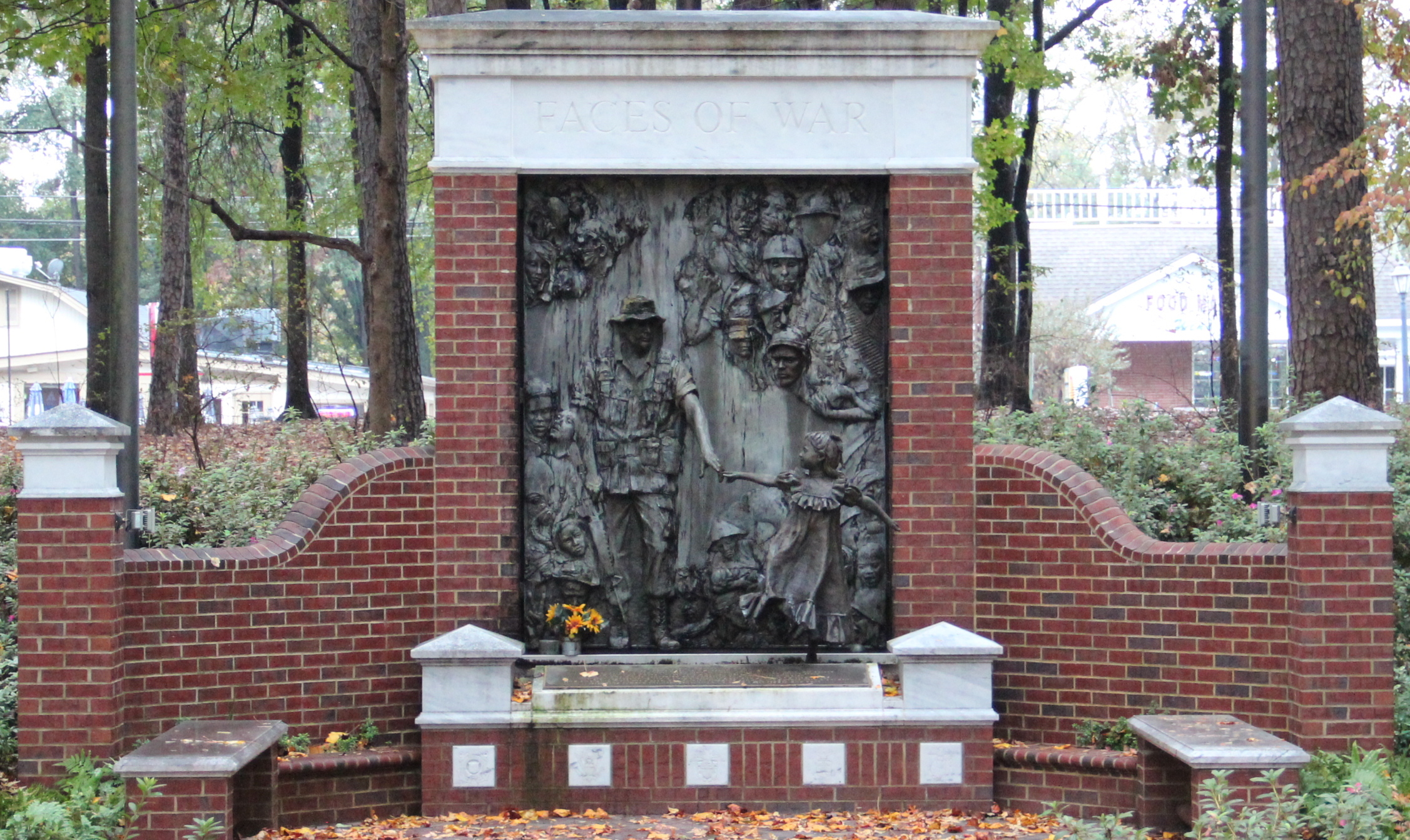
- Interactive map of Faces of War Memorial
- Location: Roswell, Georgia, United States
- Coordinates: 34°01′21″N 84°21′40″W
- Designer: Teena Stern, Don Haugen, and Zachary Henderson
- Type: War memorial
- Width: 20 ft (6.1 m)
- Height: 14 ft (4.3 m)
- Dedicated date: May 29, 1995; 31 years ago
- Dedicated to: Veterans of the Vietnam War

Faces of War Memorial is a Vietnam War memorial located in Roswell, Georgia, in the United States. It is located on the grounds of Roswell City Hall and was dedicated on Memorial Day on May 29, 1995.

The monument has a height of 14 ft (4.3 m) and a width of 20 ft (6.1 m). The monument is made of brick enclosing a sculpted bronze centerpiece topped with a capstone made of Georgia marble. The bronze-cast centerpiece depicts a soldier reaching for the outstretched hand of a small girl, surrounded by background of fifty faces, all variously displaying a range of emotions. A thin cascade of water flows over the faces from the top of the monument.

A Memorial Day ceremony is held annually at the Faces of War Memorial which began in 1998, though it was not held in 2020 due to the COVID-19 pandemic. Roswell's annual Memorial Day ceremony is the largest Memorial Day event in the state of Georgia.

The monument was designed by local architect Zachary Henderson, and the bronze-cast centerpiece of the monument was sculpted by local husband-and-wife sculptors Don Haugen and Teena Stern.

== History ==
The idea for the memorial was conceived in 1990 by a small group of local veterans. The group coordinated fundraising efforts for the monument, which included benefit concerts and selling inscribed bricks which would be laid on both the monument itself as well as along the walkway leading to the monument. A miniature model of the finalized design of the memorial was unveiled at a fundraising auction in 1993.

Construction of the monument began in mid-1994, and was completed at a cost of $150,000 and formally dedicated on Memorial Day on May 29, 1995. The dedication ceremony included a commemoration speech by Georgia's Secretary of State Max Cleland, as well as helicopter and fighter jet flyovers in a missing man formation.
