= Roswell Mill =

- U.S. Historic district – Contributing property
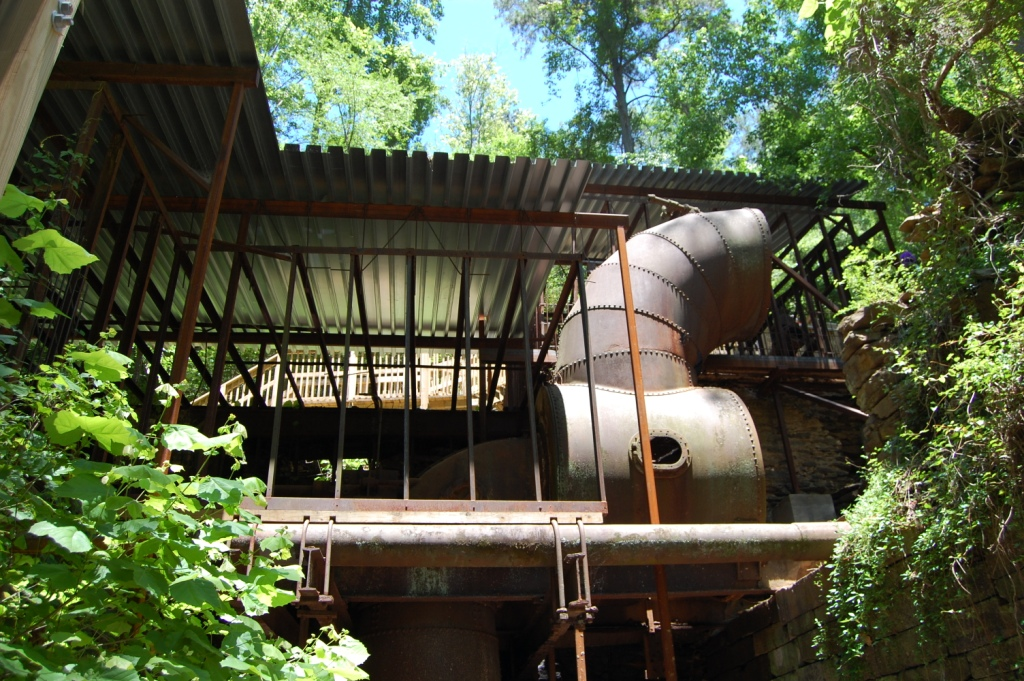
- Mill ruins, May 2009
- Location: near Vickery Creek in Roswell, Georgia
- Coordinates: 34.01338°N 84.35886°W
- Part of: Roswell Historic District (ID74000682)
- Designated CP: May 2, 1974

Roswell Mill refers to a cluster of mills located in Fulton County near Vickery Creek in Roswell, Georgia. The mills were best known for producing finished textiles from raw materials grown on nearby plantations, and the group was "the largest cotton mill in north Georgia" at its height.

The mill grew steadily, at one point producing wool and flour, in addition to cotton textiles. This diversification progressed through several phases of ownership well into the 20th century, and the mill continued producing textiles until its eventual shutdown of operations in 1975.

== Establishment ==
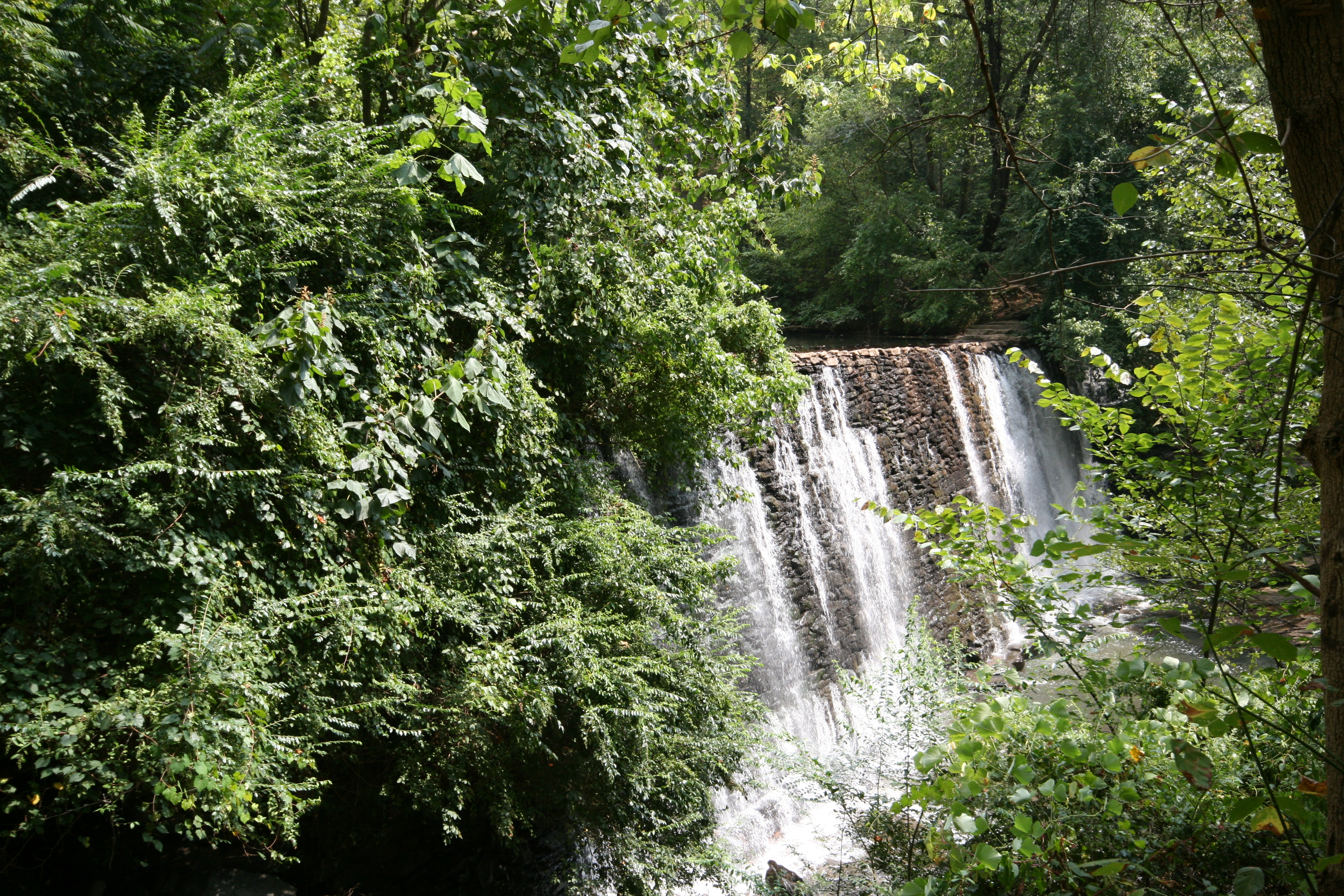
The old dam on Vickery Creek

=== Founders ===
The first mill was founded by Roswell King, a wealthy Connecticut businessman who had previously settled in Darien, Georgia, a small town on the state's Atlantic coast. He spent time as a construction manager, local militia officer (his father, Timothy King, was an American Revolutionary War veteran), and as a Representative in the Georgia State Legislature. He had also worked as the supervisor of Major Pierce Butler's two large plantations, in which office King was noted for his meticulous attention to detail in the day-to-day operations of the plantations. It was this strict recordkeeping that made King especially suited for factory management. Construction of the original mill started in 1836. Roswell King owned slaves, many of whom had built his home and the original mill; however, the number of slaves his family owned decreased once the mill was operating. Barrington King and Ralph King, two of Roswell's sons, moved to the area to help run the fledgling business. Five families from the Atlantic City of Darien would later move to Roswell, which was incorporated into Fulton County in 1854, eighteen years after the mill's first opening. An outbreak of the mumps and measles in 1847-8 left "over half the workers stricken and three slaves dead," likely due to the fact that the workers were living in close quarters and dark, cramped conditions.

=== Structure of building ===
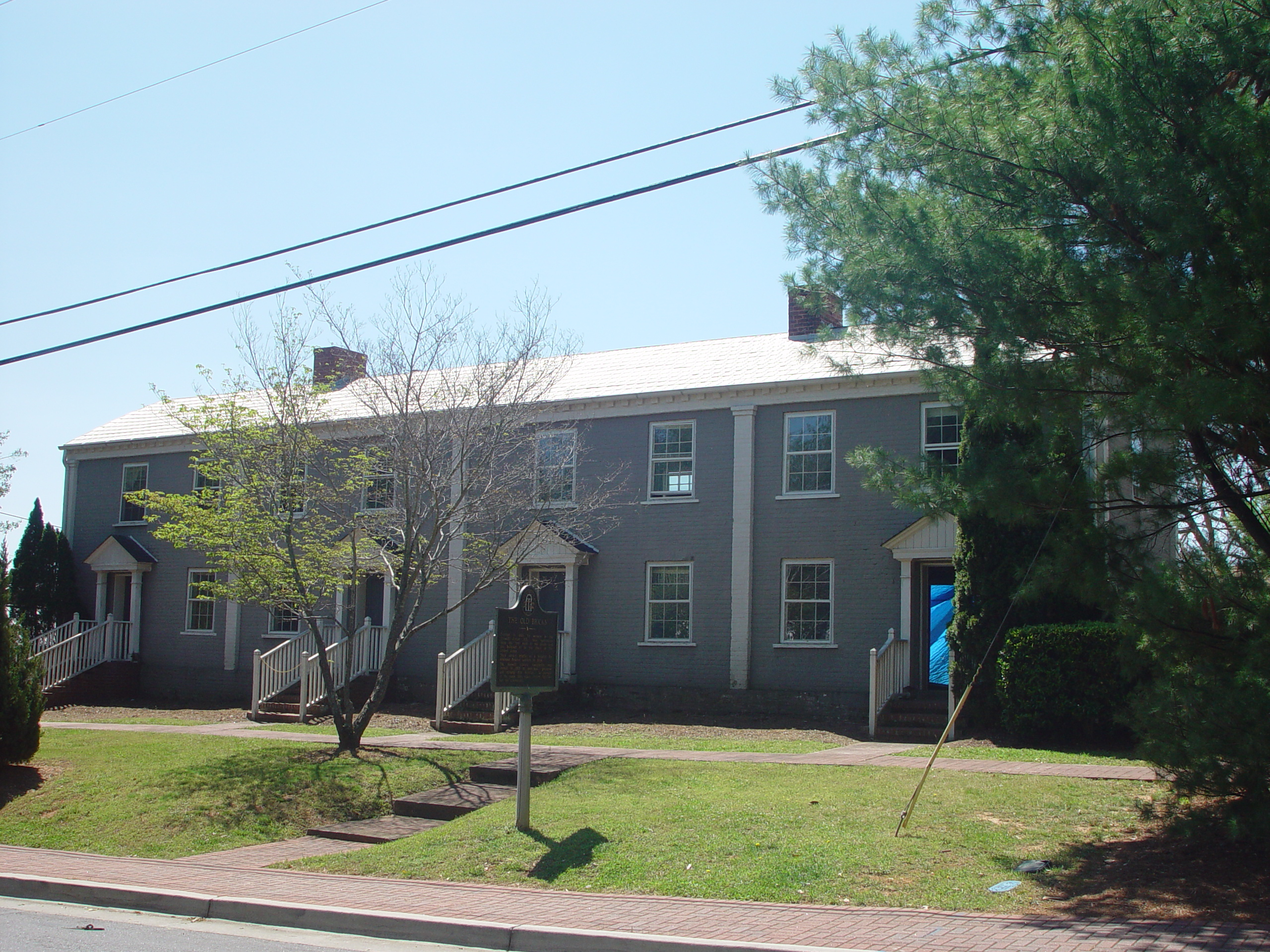
Roswell Bricks in 2007

Hydropower from Vickery Creek powered the mill, and nearby plantations supplied the raw cotton for processing. The first building was four stories high, eighty-eight feet long and forty-eight feet wide, though it was later expanded to 140 by fifty-three feet. The Roswell Mill was incorporated in 1839 by the Georgia General Assembly. The King family built two buildings, known as The Bricks, in which mill employees lived. A second mill was added in 1853, and in the antebellum period the mill complex expanded to include six different structures.

== Civil War era ==
The Roswell Mills are best known for their role in producing supplies for the Confederacy during the Civil War. They made "Roswell Gray" fabric to be sewed into Confederate military uniforms. Because it was of great importance to the South's military supply chain, General Gerrard, a Union official working under the purview of General Sherman, seized the mill on July 5, 1864. Confederate forces burned down the bridge that spanned Vickery Creek before he could get to it.

Two days after the taking of the mill, General William T. Sherman remarked, "I have ordered General Gerrard to arrest for treason all owners and employees, foreign and native, and send them under guard to Marietta, whence I will send them North...The women can find employment in Indiana." The reference to the foreigners were made because the mill owners, apparently in a ploy to safeguard the mills, planted a French flag on the mills and put a French millhand in charge.

=== Deportation of workers ===
The taking of the mill was not just a capture of infrastructure. The Union troops took about 400 mill workers, most of them women and children, to Marietta to be sent North on trains. The lack of adult male workers in the mill was a result of their fighting for the Confederacy in the Civil War at the time the mill was captured.

All of the mill workers were charged with treason. They spent a week in holding at the Georgia Military Institute before being sent North, many to Indiana, on trains. During the week while the women were held in Marietta, several Union soldiers allegedly committed acts of assault against their captives. They were then left to fend for themselves in Indiana, in towns already overcrowded with refugees. Many would die from starvation or exposure until a mill opened in 1865 that provided employment. The ultimate fates of many of these women are unknown, but the majority who survived settled in the North. Only a handful ever returned to Georgia.

== Postbellum developments ==
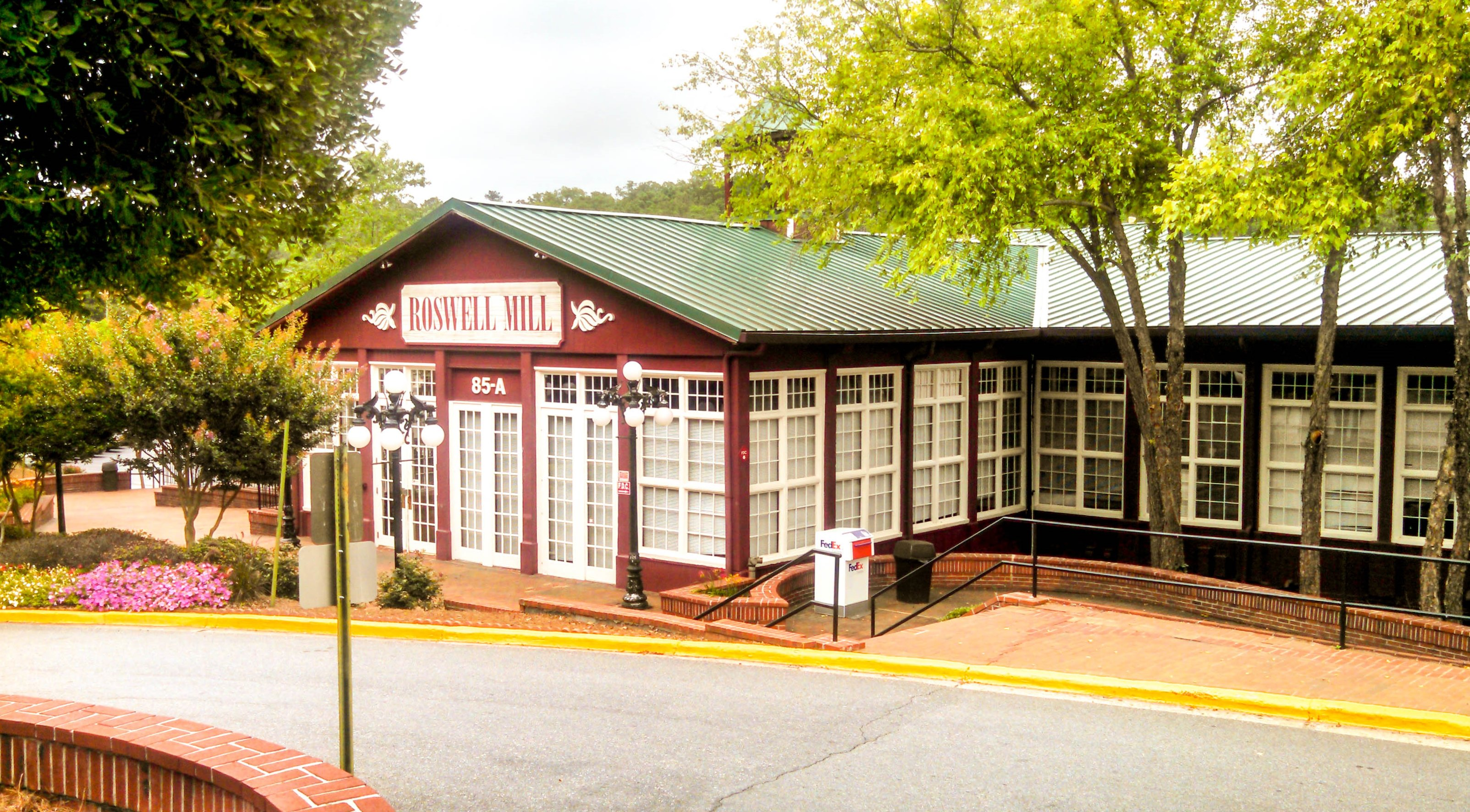
Known as Roswell Mill No. 2 when built in 1882, this structure is an adaptive reuse from former textile mill to current use as office space.

After the war one of the cotton mills and the woolen factory were rebuilt. In 1882 a second cotton mill was built.

During the Reconstruction period and the beginning of the 20th century, the Roswell Manufacturing Company underwent several important changes. In 1897, the mills began using steam power, which improved productivity but kept the mill dependent on Vickery Creek. Easley Cotton Mills, a South Carolina company, bought the mill complex for $800,000 in 1920. At that time, the mill had 120 looms and 12,000 spindles. This infrastructure is a testament to the mill's large production capacity and value to the city of Roswell.

The fact that the mill changed ownership frequently suggests its declining value in the increasingly competitive 20th-century market. In 1926, the mill was set on fire by a lightning strike, which caused about $400,000 in damage. The company was purchased by Southern Mills in 1947.

In 1975, the mill halted operations as a result of outsourcing cotton production overseas. The mill's recent past is far less recorded in history than its pre-1950 history. There is no readily available record of the impact of the mill's closure on the surrounding area. It seems that the mill lost much of its money-making power when the age of King Cotton had passed.

Part or all of the mill was included in the Roswell Historic District, listed on the National Register of Historic Places in 1974.

== Current status ==
The historic Roswell Mills are now under the jurisdiction of the U.S. National Park Service. The mills are considered part of the Chattahoochee River Recreation Area, a popular local tourist attraction due to its nature trails, running paths, and rich history. Remnants of various buildings are still visible, and the covered bridge spanning Vickery Creek has been rebuilt. A private contractor was scheduled to clear away the effects of the elements from the mill site in the summer of 2008. The appearance of the mills suggest that the focus has been on conservation, not preservation. A sculpture of a crumbling column stands near the mill as a memorial to those who were deported, and its inscription reads as follows:

Honoring the memory of the four hundred women, children, and men mill workers of Roswell who were charged with treason and deported by train to the north by invading federal forces

The monument was made public in 2000, following a rise in interest in the tragedies that surrounded the deportation, which had been largely forgotten in the aftermath of the Civil War.
