= Roswell, Georgia =

City in the United States

- City
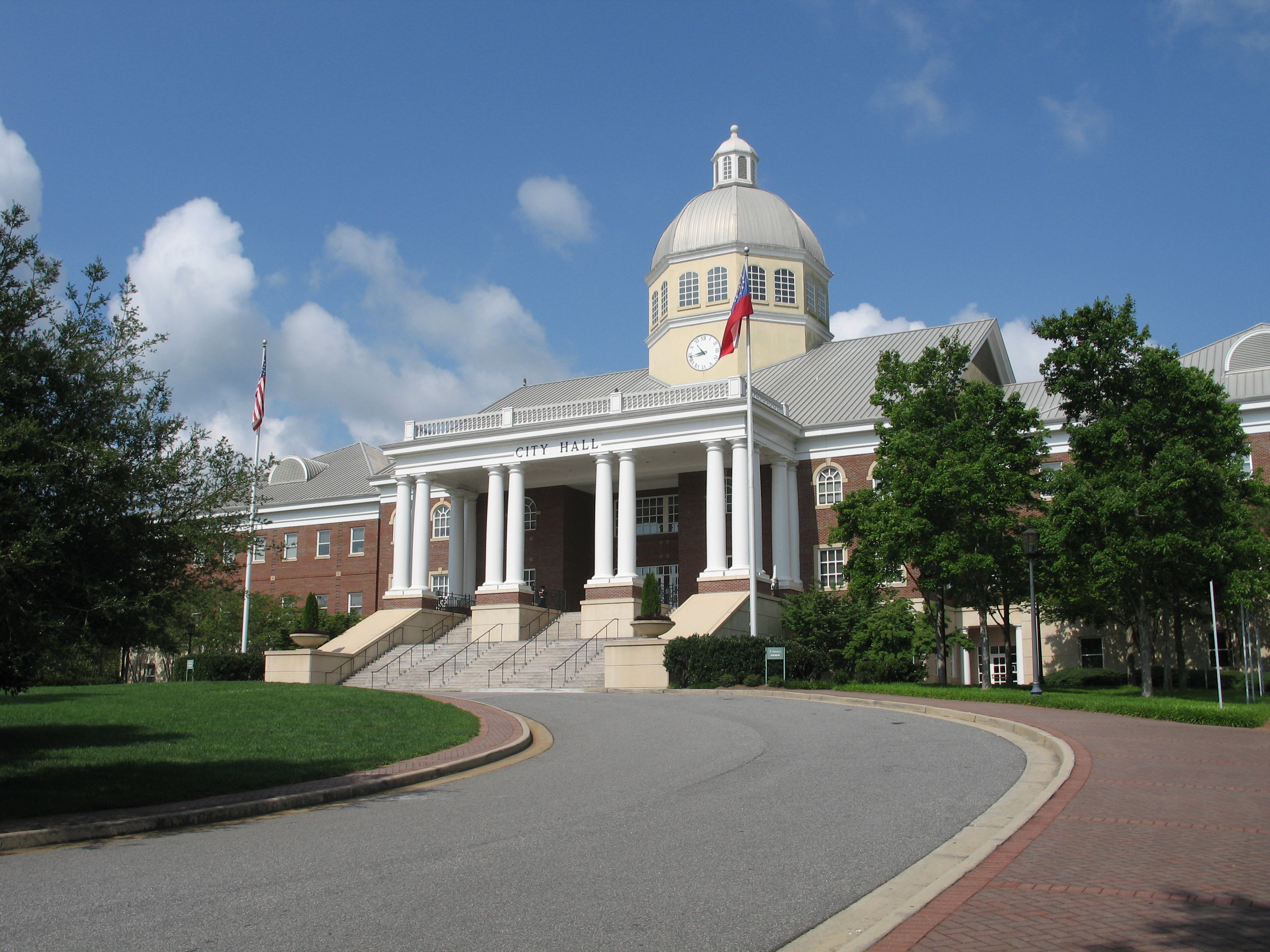
- Roswell City Hall

- Flag Seal
- Coordinates: 34°02′21″N 84°21′05″W
- Country: United States
- State: Georgia
- County: Fulton
- Incorporated: February 16, 1854; 172 years ago
- Named for: Roswell King

Government
  - Mayor: Mary Robichaux
  - City Administrator: Randy Knighton
  - City Council: Sarah Beeson, Christine Hall, Alan Sells, Eren Brumley, Jennifer Phillippi, Chris Zack

Area
  - Total: 38.91 sq mi (100.77 km^{2})
  - Land: 38.41 sq mi (99.48 km^{2})
  - Water: 1.27 sq mi (3.29 km^{2}) 3.1%
- Elevation: 1,050 ft (320 m)

Population (2020)
  - Total: 92,833
  - Density: 2,279.4/sq mi (880.08/km^{2})
- Time zone: UTC−5 (EST)
  - Summer (DST): UTC−4 (EDT)
- ZIP codes: 30075-30077
- Area code: 770/678/404
- FIPS code: 13-67284
- GNIS feature ID: 2404651
- Website: roswellgov.com

Roswell is a city in northern Fulton County, Georgia, United States. At the official 2020 census, the city had a population of 92,883, making Roswell the state's ninth largest city. A suburb of Atlanta, Roswell has an affluent National Register Historic District.

== History and government ==
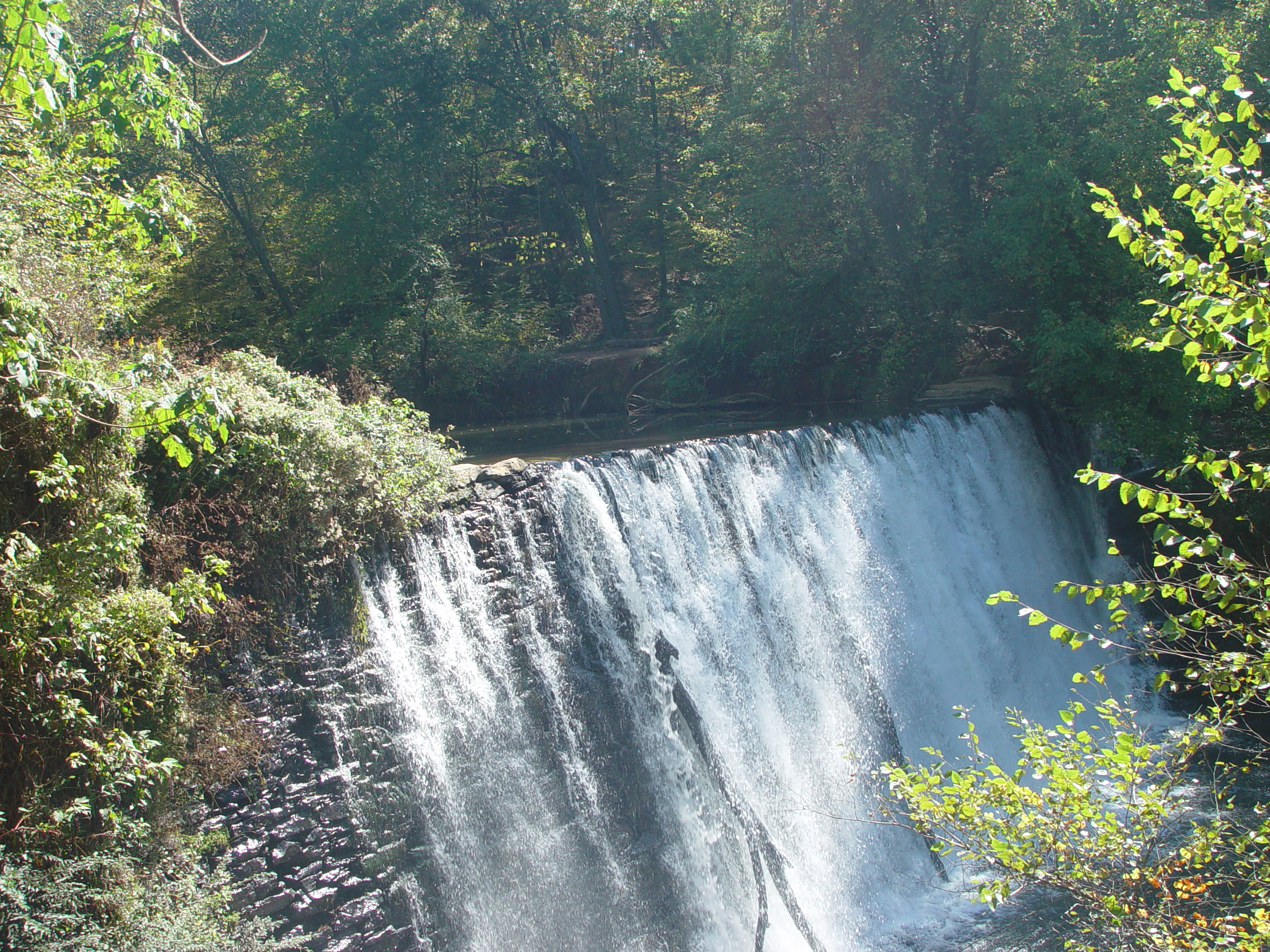
Vickery (Big) Creek Dam

In 1830, while on a trip to northern Georgia, Roswell King passed through the area of what is now Roswell and observed the great potential for building a cotton mill along Vickery Creek. Since the land nearby was also good for plantations, he planned to put cotton processing near cotton production.

Toward the middle of the 1830s, King returned to build a mill that would soon become the largest in North Georgia – Roswell Mill. He brought with him 36 enslaved Africans from his own coastal plantation, plus another 42 skilled enslaved carpenters bought in Savannah to build the mills. The enslaved built the mills, infrastructure, houses, mill worker apartments, and supporting buildings for the new town. The enslaved Africans brought their unique Geechee culture, language, and religious traditions from the coast to north Georgia.

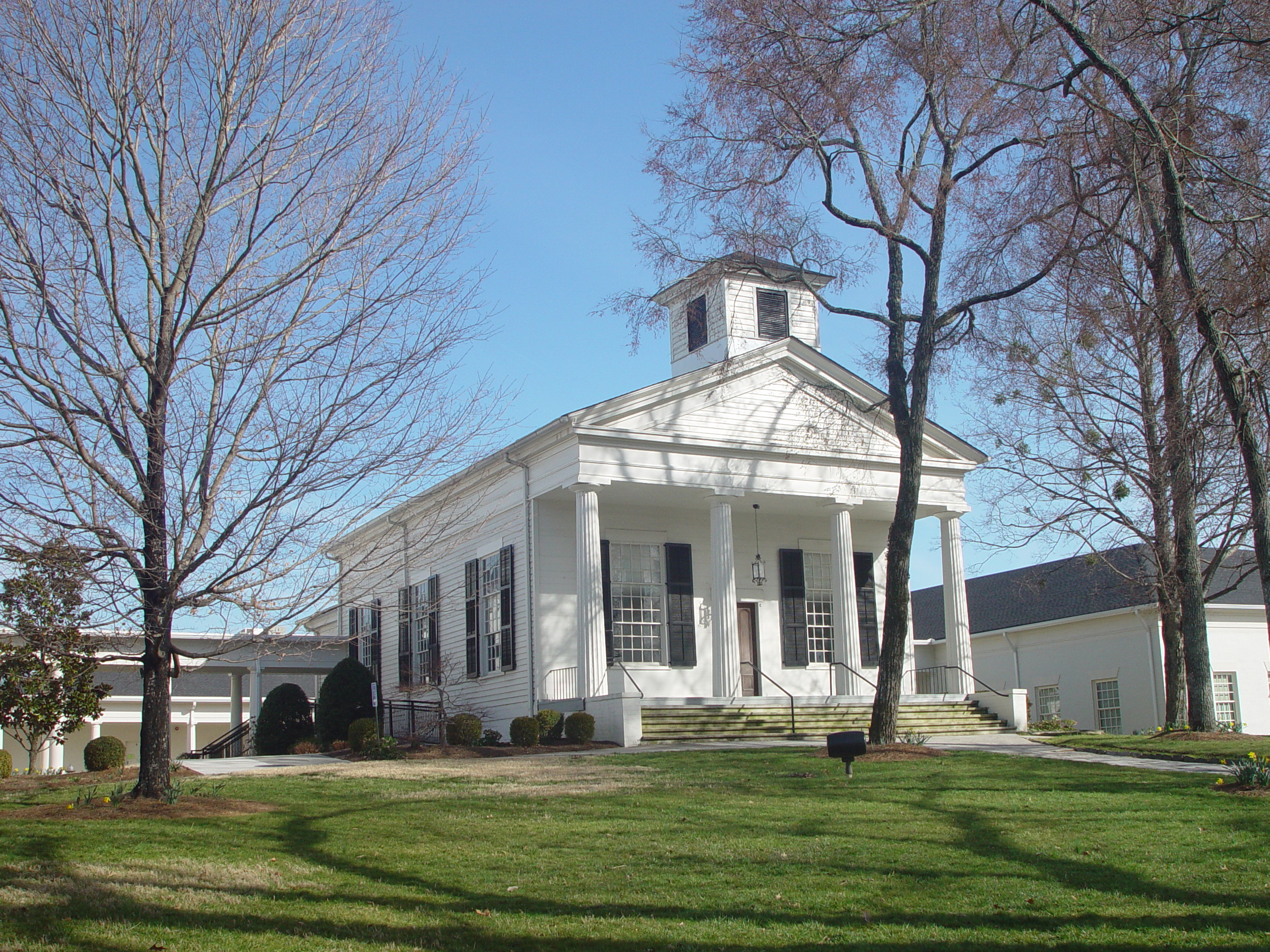
The old Roswell Presbyterian Church, built in 1839

King invited investors from the coast to join him at the new location. He was also joined by Barrington King, one of his sons, who succeeded his father in the manufacturing company. Archibald Smith was one of the planters who migrated there to establish a new plantation, also bringing enslaved African Americans from the coastal areas.

Shortly after 1832 a survey of the area was conducted by Nathan Crawford Barnett as part of the Cherokee Purchase in preparation for the sixth state administrated land lottery culminating in the Cherokee removal.

Barrington Hall (the home of Barrington King), Smith Plantation (the home of Archibald Smith), and Bulloch Hall (the childhood home of President Theodore Roosevelt's mother, Mittie Bulloch) have been preserved and restored. They are now open to the public. According to the 1850 Slave Schedules, these three "founding families", together with the next three largest planters, held 192 slaves, 51% of the total 378 slaves held in the Roswell District. Archibald Smith had a 300-acre (1.2 km^{2}) cotton plantation. According to the 1850 Census, Barrington King held 70 enslaved Blacks. Half of them were under the age of 10. These enslaved people worked in the Barrington's household. Barrington King "leased" or "rented" some of his enslaved adult males to the Roswell Manufacturing Company, but they did not work around the mill machinery.

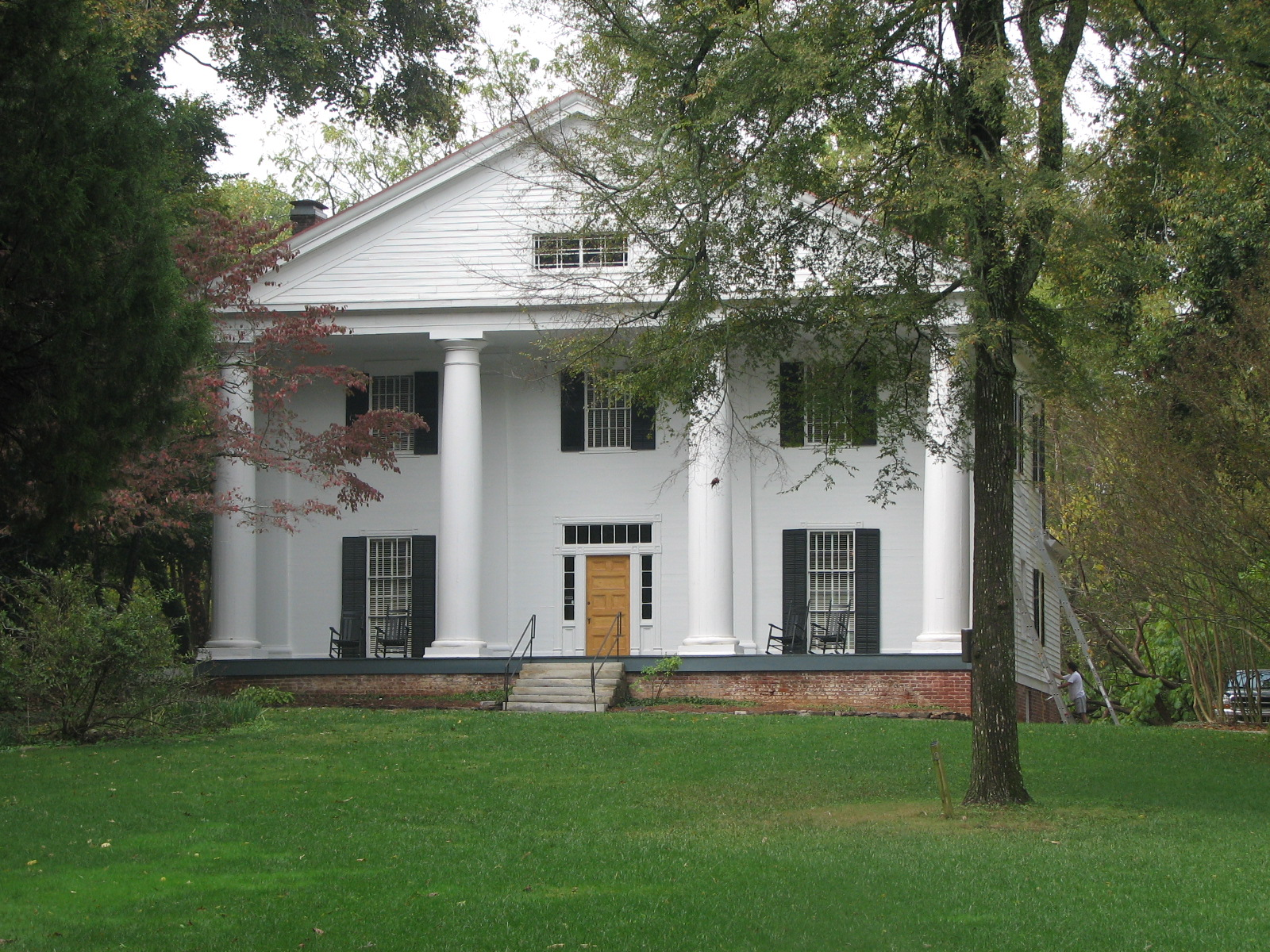
Bulloch Hall, built in 1839

The Roswell area was part of Cobb County when first settled, and the county seat of Marietta was a four-hour (one-way) horseback ride to the west. Since Roswell residents desired a local government, they submitted a city charter for incorporation to the Georgia General Assembly. The charter was approved on February 16, 1854.

By the time of the Civil War, the cotton mills employed more than 400 people, mostly women. Given settlement patterns in the Piedmont region, they were likely of Scots-Irish descent. As the mill increased in production, so did the number of people living in the area.

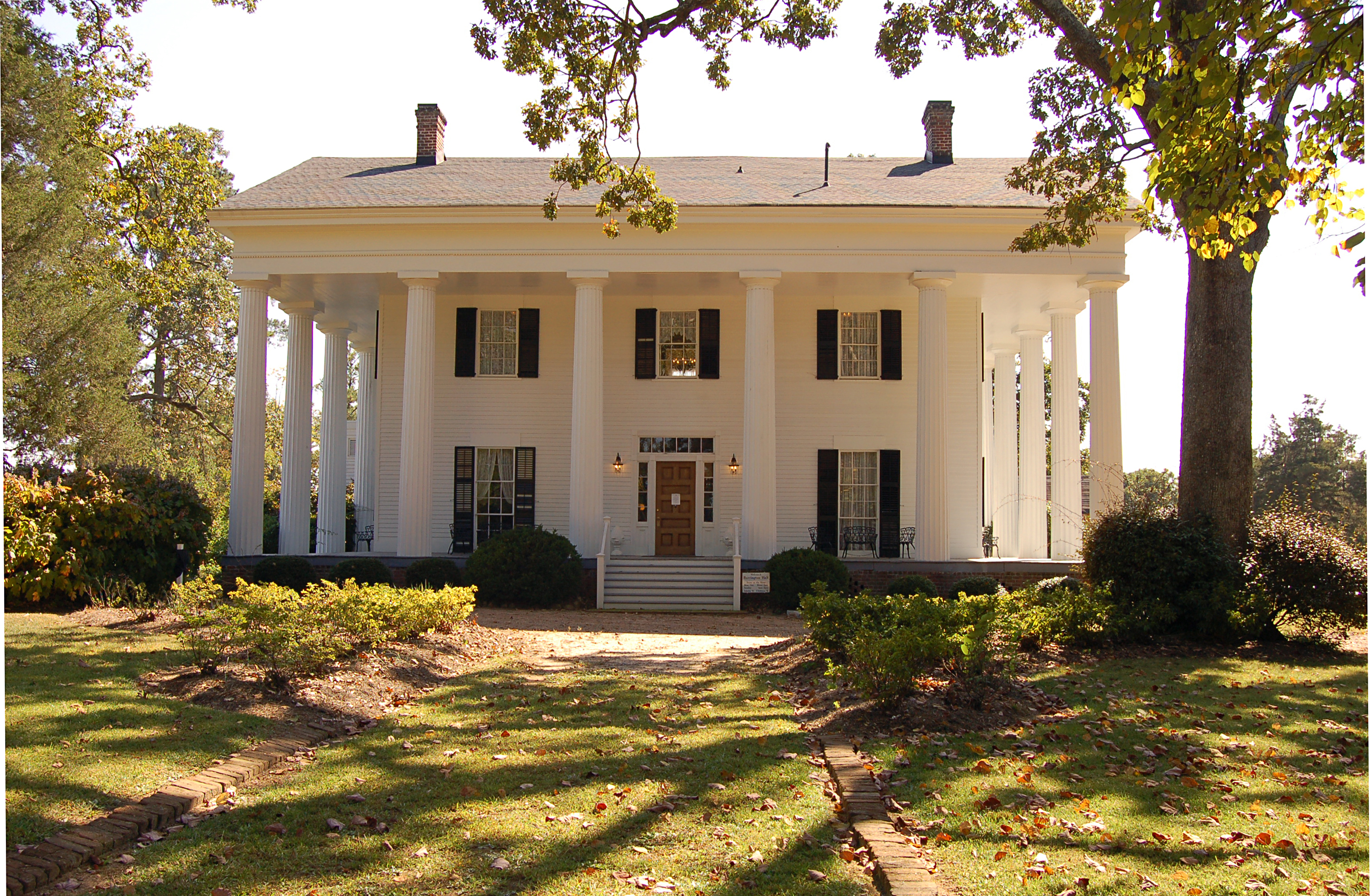
Barrington Hall, built in 1842

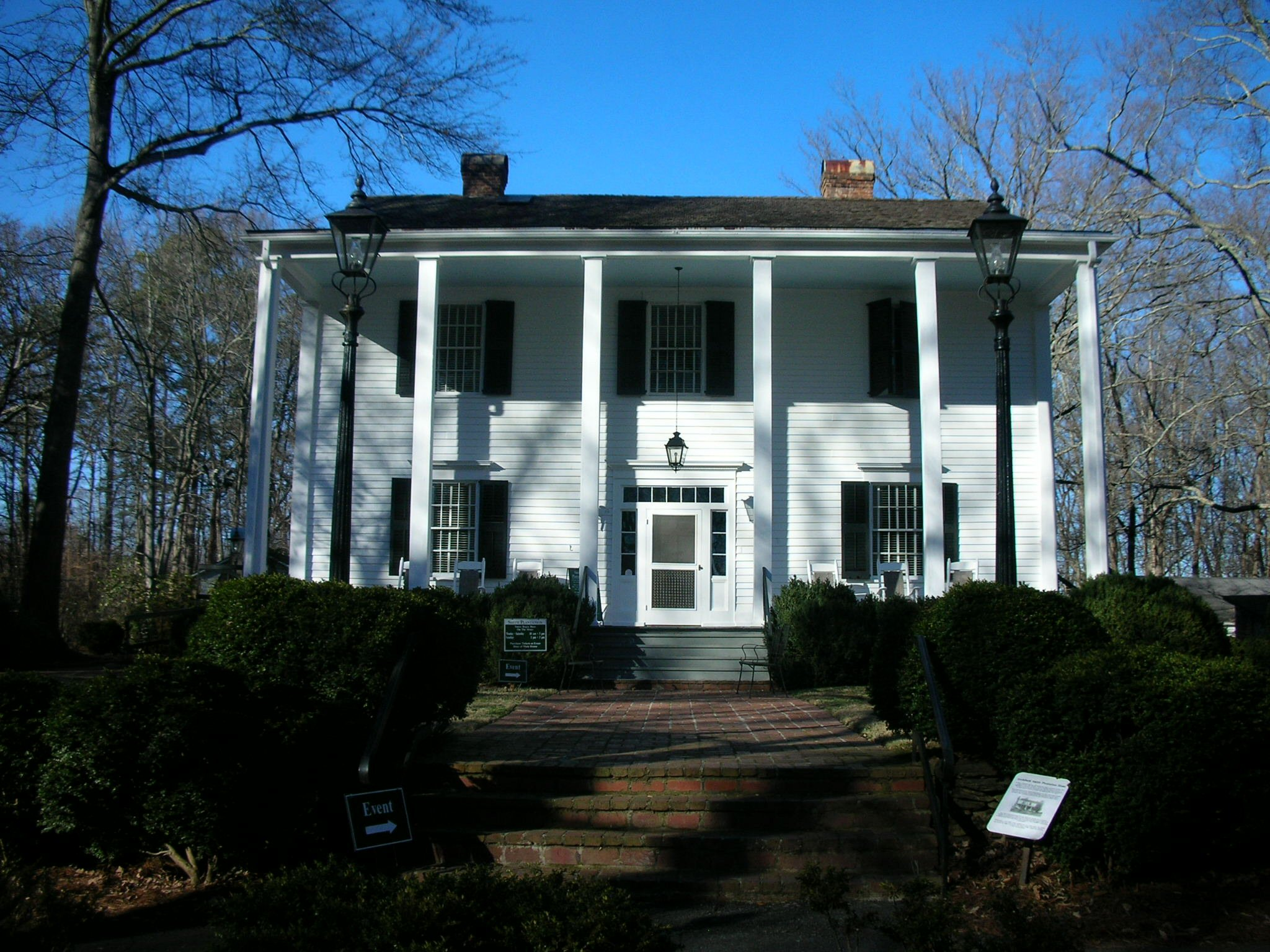
Archibald Smith Plantation Home, built in 1845

During the Civil War, the city was captured by Union forces under the leadership of General Kenner Garrard. Under orders of General Sherman, Garrard shipped the mill workers north to prevent them from returning to work if the mills were rebuilt. This was a common tactic of Sherman to economically disrupt the Confederate rebellion. The mill was burned, but the houses were left standing. The ruins of the mill and the 30-foot (9.1 m) dam that was built for power still remain. Most of the town's property was confiscated by Union forces. The leading families had left the town to go to safer places well before the Civil War, and arranged for the enslaved people to be taken away from advancing Union troops, as was often the practice. Some slaves may have escaped to freedom beyond Union lines.

After the war, Barrington King rebuilt the mills and resumed production. While many freedmen stayed in the area to work as paid labor on plantations or in town, others migrated to Fulton County and Atlanta for new opportunities. The South suffered an agricultural depression resulting from the effects of the war and the end of slavery in the United States.

According to the census, the population of Cobb County decreased slightly from 14,242 in 1860 to 13,814 in 1870. The proportion of African-Americans decreased more, from 27% to 23%. During those years, Fulton County more than doubled in population, from 14,427 to 33,336. The effects of dramatic African-American migration can be seen by the increase in Fulton County from 20.5% slave in 1860 to 45.7% colored (Black) in 1870.

At the end of 1931, the United States was in the midst of the Great Depression. The difficult economic conditions drove Milton County, Roswell's neighboring county to the north (note: much of what is now Roswell was part of Milton County already), to merge in its entirety with Fulton County, Roswell's neighboring county to the south. To facilitate the merger, Roswell was ceded from Cobb County to become part of Fulton County. This became effective the 9th day of May in 1932. Roswell filed all legal records, including vital statistics, real estate, and the results of torts with the county clerk of Cobb before this date; with the county clerk of Fulton, after this date.

== Geography ==
Roswell is located in northern Fulton County. It is bordered to the north by Milton, to the northeast by Alpharetta, to the east by Johns Creek, to the southeast by Peachtree Corners in Gwinnett County, to the south by Sandy Springs, to the west by unincorporated land in Cobb County, and to the northwest by the city of Mountain Park and by unincorporated land in Cherokee County. The southern boundary of the city follows the Chattahoochee River.

According to the United States Census Bureau, Roswell has a total area of 37.0 square miles (100.8 km2), of which 40.7 square miles (105.5 km^{2}) is land and 1.3 square miles (3.3 km^{2}), or 3.06%, is water.

=== Geographic features ===
- Big Creek
- Bull Sluice Lake
- Chattahoochee River
- Morgan Falls Dam
- Johns Creek
- Crooked Creek
- Audery Mill Creek

=== Climate ===
Roswell features a Humid subtropical climate, which is characterized by abundant precipitation that is spread evenly throughout the year.

Climate data for Roswell, Georgia
| Month | Jan | Feb | Mar | Apr | May | Jun | Jul | Aug | Sep | Oct | Nov | Dec | Year |
|---|---|---|---|---|---|---|---|---|---|---|---|---|---|
| Mean daily maximum °F (°C) | 49.2 (9.6) | 53.4 (11.9) | 62.4 (16.9) | 71.5 (21.9) | 78.4 (25.8) | 84.9 (29.4) | 87.4 (30.8) | 86.9 (30.5) | 81.3 (27.4) | 71.7 (22.1) | 62.3 (16.8) | 52.7 (11.5) | 70.2 (21.2) |
| Mean daily minimum °F (°C) | 27.9 (−2.3) | 29.9 (−1.2) | 37.0 (2.8) | 44.7 (7.1) | 53.9 (12.2) | 61.9 (16.6) | 65.6 (18.7) | 65.2 (18.4) | 59.3 (15.2) | 46.7 (8.2) | 37.5 (3.1) | 30.7 (−0.7) | 46.7 (8.2) |
| Average rainfall inches (mm) | 4.9 (120) | 4.9 (120) | 6.0 (150) | 4.2 (110) | 4.3 (110) | 3.8 (97) | 4.5 (110) | 4.0 (100) | 3.8 (97) | 3.6 (91) | 3.7 (94) | 4.7 (120) | 52.3 (1,330) |

== Demographics ==
Historical population
| Census | Pop. | Note | %± |
|---|---|---|---|
| 1870 | 479 | | — |
| 1880 | 1,180 | | 146.3% |
| 1890 | 1,138 | | −3.6% |
| 1900 | 1,329 | | 16.8% |
| 1910 | 1,158 | | −12.9% |
| 1920 | 1,227 | | 6.0% |
| 1930 | 1,432 | | 16.7% |
| 1940 | 1,622 | | 13.3% |
| 1950 | 2,123 | | 30.9% |
| 1960 | 2,983 | | 40.5% |
| 1970 | 5,430 | | 82.0% |
| 1980 | 23,337 | | 329.8% |
| 1990 | 47,923 | | 105.4% |
| 2000 | 79,334 | | 65.5% |
| 2010 | 88,346 | | 11.4% |
| 2020 | 92,833 | | 5.1% |
| 2025 (est.) | 91,505 | ▼ | −1.4% |
U.S. Decennial Census; 1850-1870 1870-1880; 1890-1910 1920-1930; 1940 1950 1960; 1970 1980 1990; 2000 2010 2020; 2025

=== Racial and ethnic composition ===
Roswell, Georgia – Racial and ethnic composition Note: the US Census treats Hispanic/Latino as an ethnic category. This table excludes Latinos from the racial categories and assigns them to a separate category. Hispanics/Latinos may be of any race.
| Race / Ethnicity (NH = Non-Hispanic) | Pop 2000 | Pop 2010 | Pop 2020 | % 2000 | % 2010 | % 2020 |
|---|---|---|---|---|---|---|
| White alone (NH) | 59,870 | 58,008 | 58,745 | 75.47% | 65.66% | 63.28% |
| Black or African American alone (NH) | 6,620 | 10,066 | 10,694 | 8.34% | 11.39% | 11.52% |
| Native American or Alaska Native alone (NH) | 107 | 130 | 87 | 0.13% | 0.15% | 0.09% |
| Asian alone (NH) | 2,932 | 3,545 | 4,626 | 3.70% | 4.01% | 4.98% |
| Native Hawaiian or Pacific Islander alone (NH) | 23 | 38 | 31 | 0.03% | 0.04% | 0.03% |
| Other race alone (NH) | 194 | 315 | 707 | 0.24% | 0.36% | 0.76% |
| Mixed race or Multiracial (NH) | 1,167 | 1,545 | 3,853 | 1.47% | 1.75% | 4.15% |
| Hispanic or Latino (any race) | 8,421 | 14,699 | 14,090 | 10.61% | 16.64% | 15.18% |
| Total | 79,334 | 88,346 | 92,833 | 100.00% | 100.00% | 100.00% |

=== 2020 census ===
As of the 2020 census, Roswell had a population of 92,833 and 36,163 households, of which 25,529 were families. The median age was 40.0 years. 22.6% of residents were under the age of 18 and 15.6% of residents were 65 years of age or older. For every 100 females there were 94.2 males, and for every 100 females age 18 and over there were 91.2 males age 18 and over.

100.0% of residents lived in urban areas, while 0.0% lived in rural areas.

There were 36,163 households in Roswell, of which 32.4% had children under the age of 18 living in them. Of all households, 54.2% were married-couple households, 15.3% were households with a male householder and no spouse or partner present, and 25.3% were households with a female householder and no spouse or partner present. About 24.9% of all households were made up of individuals and 9.3% had someone living alone who was 65 years of age or older.

There were 38,032 housing units, of which 4.9% were vacant. The homeowner vacancy rate was 1.4% and the rental vacancy rate was 7.4%.

In 2020, the racial and ethnic makeup of the city was 63.28% non-Hispanic white, 11.52% Black or African American, 0.09% Native American, 4.98% Asian, 0.03% Pacific Islander, 0.76% some other race, 4.15% multiracial, and 15.18% Hispanic or Latino of any race.

Racial composition as of the 2020 census
| Race | Number | Percent |
|---|---|---|
| White | 60,712 | 65.4% |
| Black or African American | 10,925 | 11.8% |
| American Indian and Alaska Native | 377 | 0.4% |
| Asian | 4,646 | 5.0% |
| Native Hawaiian and Other Pacific Islander | 34 | 0.0% |
| Some other race | 6,312 | 6.8% |
| Two or more races | 9,827 | 10.6% |
| Hispanic or Latino (of any race) | 14,090 | 15.2% |

=== 2000 census ===
As of the 2000 census, its racial makeup was 75.47% non-Hispanic white, 8.34% Black or African American, 0.13% Native American, 3.70% Asian, 0.03% Pacific Islander, 0.24% some other race, 1.47% multiracial, and 10.61% Hispanic or Latino of any race.

=== Income and poverty ===
According to a 2007 estimate, the median income for a household in the city was $73,469, and the median income for a family was $103,698. The average income for households was $106,219, and the average income for families was $123,481. Males had a median income of $72,754 versus $45,979 for females. The per capita income for the city was $40,106. About 3.2% of families and 5.0% of the population were below the poverty line, including 5.6% of those under age 18 and 0.7% of those age 65 or over. In a 2022 estimate, the median household income was $130,008 with a per capita income of $65,061.

== Economy ==
The Consulate-General of Honduras in Atlanta is located at Suite 3 in 600 Houze Way in Roswell. The city's largest employers are the Kimberly Clark Corporation, Wellstar North Fulton Hospital, Harry's Farmers Market, and the City Of Roswell. A section of Route 400 between Roswell and Atlanta is known as the high tech corridor, where many technology firms like Kimberly Clark have factories or offices. As of the 2006 census, one third of Roswell's 5.000 registered business were home based. The largest industries were retail, technology, food services, wholesale trade, and health care.

Many Roswell residents work in nearby Atlanta.

Businesses with their headquarters in Roswell include Snorg Tees, Tripwire Interactive, and Pharsalia Technologies.

== Arts and culture ==
=== Festivals and parades ===
- Roswell Memorial Day Ceremony — the largest Memorial Day ceremony in Georgia
- Roswell Roots: A Festival of Black History & Culture (February)
- Roswell Criterium Bicycle Race and Historic Roswell Kiwanis Kids Bike Safety Rodeo (May)
- Roswell Magnolia Storytelling Festival (June)
- Riverside Sounds Concert Series (May — October)
- Roswell Youth Day Parade and Festival (October)
- Keep Roswell Beautiful Duck Race (October)
- Roswell Annual Fireworks Extravaganza July 4
- Roswell Wine Festival (first Sunday in October - Sunday, October 4, 2015)
- Alive in Roswell (third Thursday of the month, April–October)

=== Sites ===
- Archibald Smith Plantation Home
- Atlanta Rowing Club
- Bulloch Hall
- Barrington Hall
- Chattahoochee River National Recreation Area
- Chattahoochee Nature Center
- Mimms Museum of Technology and Art
- Faces of War Memorial
- Roswell Mill
- Primrose Cottage
- Teaching Museum North

=== Public libraries ===
Atlanta-Fulton Public Library System operates the Roswell Branch and the East Roswell Branch.

== Parks and recreation ==
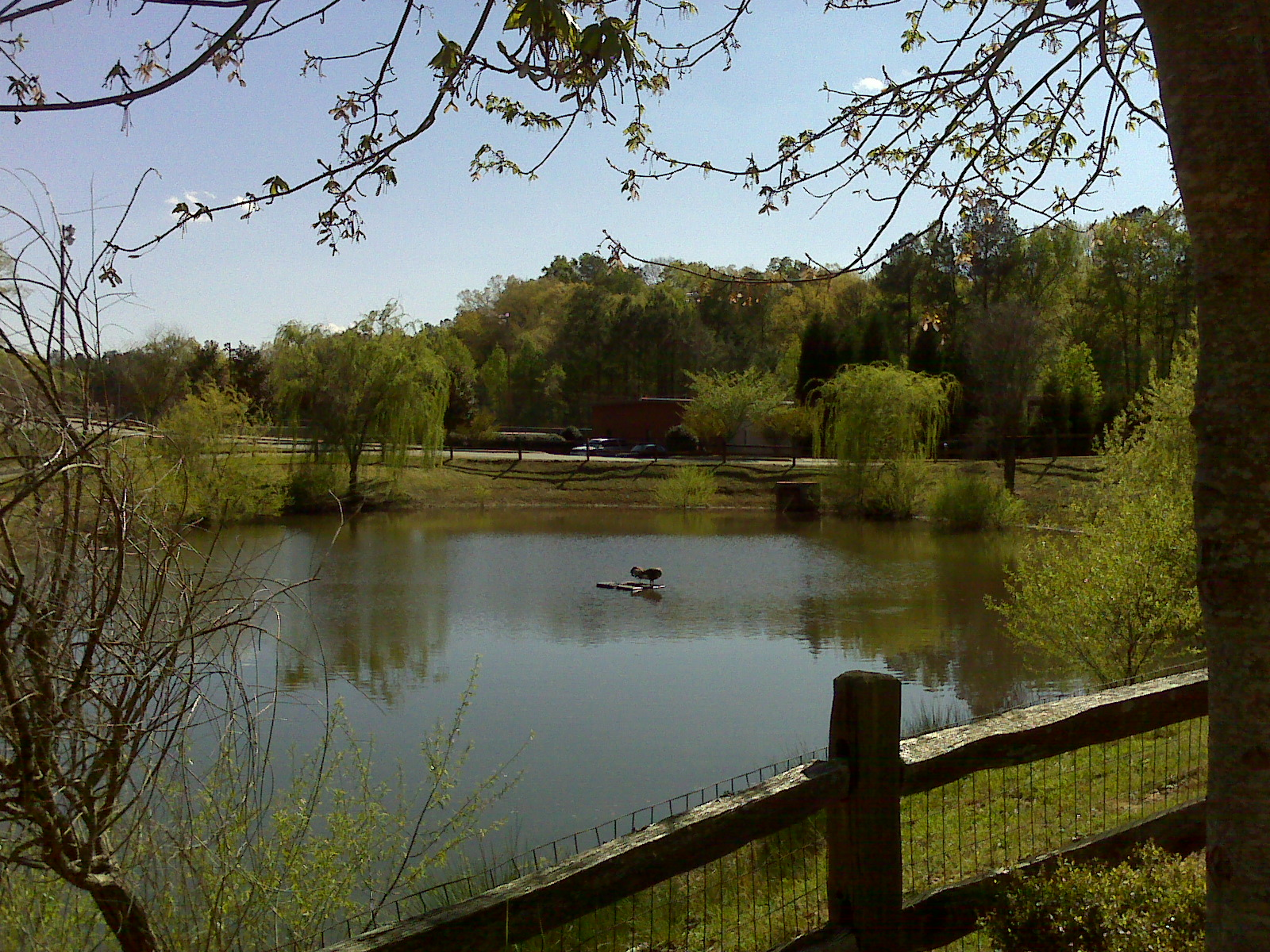
Pond at East Roswell Park

The city maintains more than 900 acres (3.6 km^{2}) of parkland, as well as three historic house museums that are former plantations.

A branch of the Chattahoochee River National Recreation Area, a component of the National Park System, is located in Roswell at Vickery Creek.

== Education ==
=== Public schools ===
Roswell's local public schools are part of the Fulton County School System.

==== Charter schools ====
- Amana Academy (K–8)
- Fulton County Charter High School of Mathematics and Science (disbanded)
- Fulton Academy of Science and Technology (K-8)
- International Charter School of Atlanta (K-8)

==== Elementary schools ====
- Esther Jackson Elementary School
- Hembree Springs Elementary School
- Mimosa Elementary School
- Mountain Park Elementary School
- Northwood Elementary School
- Roswell North Elementary School
- Sweet Apple Elementary School
- Hillside Elementary School
- River Eves Elementary School
- Vickery Mill Elementary School

==== Middle schools ====
- Crabapple Middle School
- Elkins Pointe Middle School
- Holcomb Bridge Middle School

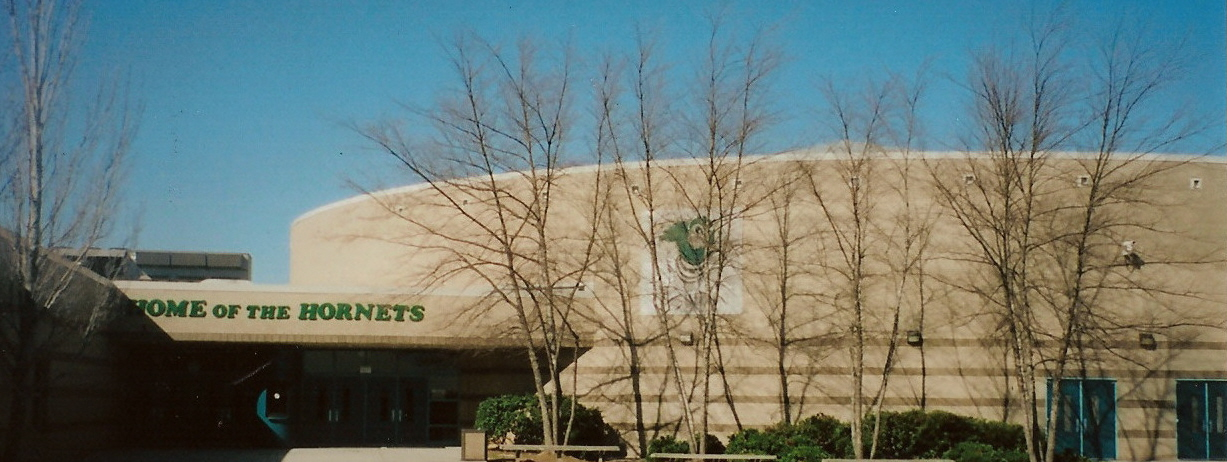
Entrance to Roswell High School. The gymnasium (aka the Stinger Dome) is visible with its domed roof.

==== High schools ====
- Centennial High School
- Crossroads Second Chance North Alternative School
- Roswell High School

=== Private schools ===
- Blessed Trinity Catholic High School
- Cottage School
- Queen of Angels Catholic School
- The Howard School (North Campus)
- Jacob's Ladder Neurodevelopmental School & Therapy Center (Roswell Campus)
- Regina Caeli Academy
- Fellowship Christian School
- Atlanta Academy
- Eaton Academy
- Saint Francis Schools

== Infrastructure ==
=== Major roads and expressways ===
- State Route 9
- State Route 92
- State Route 120
- State Route 140
- State Route 400
- Pine Grove Road
- Riverside Road
- Crabapple Road

=== Pedestrians and cycling ===
- Big Creek Greenway
- PATH400 (proposed)
- Roswell Riverwalk Trail
- Vickery Creek Trail

== Notable people ==
- Charlie Asensio, soccer player
- Kat Asman, soccer player
- Jerome Bettis, former Pittsburgh Steeler and current NBC Sports announcer
- Peter Buck, musician, attended Crestwood High School
- Jay Busbee, author/journalist, resides in Roswell
- David Cross, comedian, television, and film actor, writer, and director, lived in Roswell as a child and attended Crestwood High School
- Deko, born Grant Andrew Decouto in Roswell, rapper and Grammy-nominated music producer
- Emily Dolvin, aunt of Jimmy Carter (the 39th US president), lived in Roswell the majority of her life
- Ben Finegold, chess grandmaster, founded the Chess Club and Scholastic Center of Atlanta (CCSCATL) in Roswell
- Jeff Foxworthy (born 1958), stand-up comedian, actor, television/radio personality, author, and voice artist
- Karen Handel, former Georgia Secretary of State, former US Representative of the 6th congressional district of Georgia, resides in Roswell
- Jessi Kirtley, stage actress
- Cal Jennings, soccer player
- Regina Lynch-Hudson, publicist, travel writer, and historian, lived here
- Landon Milbourne, basketball player for Hapoel Eilat of the Israeli Basketball Premier League
- Anya Monzikova, Russian-American actress and model, lives in Roswell with her husband
- Brendan Moore, professional soccer player
- Dale Murphy, two-time National League MVP, former Atlanta Braves MLB player, lived in Roswell in the early 1990s
- Paul Newman, actor, film director, race car driver, philanthropist, and entrepreneur.
- Pauley Perrette, writer, singer, civil rights advocate and former actress, attended Crestwood High School
- Jermaine Phillips (born 1979), football safety in the NFL for the Tampa Bay Buccaneers, 2002–2009
- Tony Phillips, baseball utility player who had an 18-year Major League Baseball (MLB) career from 1982 to 1999.
- Tom Price, former Congressman from the 6th congressional district of Georgia
- Mike Ramsey, former Roswell High baseball star, went on to play for the NL's St. Louis Cardinals (MLB) 1978–1985; played on the World Series Champion Cardinals in 1982
- Neel Reid, architect; lived in Mimosa Hall and died there in 1926
- Chris Reis, former professional football safety, Super Bowl XLIV champion (New Orleans Saints), Roswell High graduate
- Martha Bulloch Roosevelt, mother of Theodore Roosevelt and grandmother of Eleanor Roosevelt, came from Roswell
- Nap Rucker, left-handed pitcher in MLB for the Brooklyn Superbas/Dodgers/Robins
- Sam Sloman (born 1997), NFL football player
- Jack Smith (born 1924), racing driver
- Amin Stevens (born 1990), basketball player in the Israeli Basketball Premier League
- Sunny Suljic (born 2005), actor
- Demaryius Thomas (1987–2021), professional American football wide receiver, primarily for the Denver Broncos, Super Bowl 50 champion, found dead in his Roswell residence in 2021
- Stevie Wilkerson, coach for the Gwinnett Stripers
- Vincent Mason, country music singer-songwriter and guitarist
- Emma Grace Hurley, professional runner is a Roswell native and graduate of Fellowship Christian School.
