= Crestwood High School =

Crestwood High School may refer to:

- Crestwood High School (New South Wales), Baulkham Hills, New South Wales
- Crestwood High School (Iowa), Cresco, Iowa
- Crestwood High School (Michigan), Dearborn Heights, Michigan
- Crestwood High School (Ohio), Mantua, Ohio
- Crestwood High School (Pennsylvania), Mountain Top, Pennsylvania
- Crestwood High School (South Carolina), Sumter, South Carolina
- Crestwood High School (Georgia), Sandy Springs, Georgia
- Crestwood Secondary School, Peterborough, Ontario
