= Roswell High School (Georgia) =

Public high school in Roswell, Georgia, United States

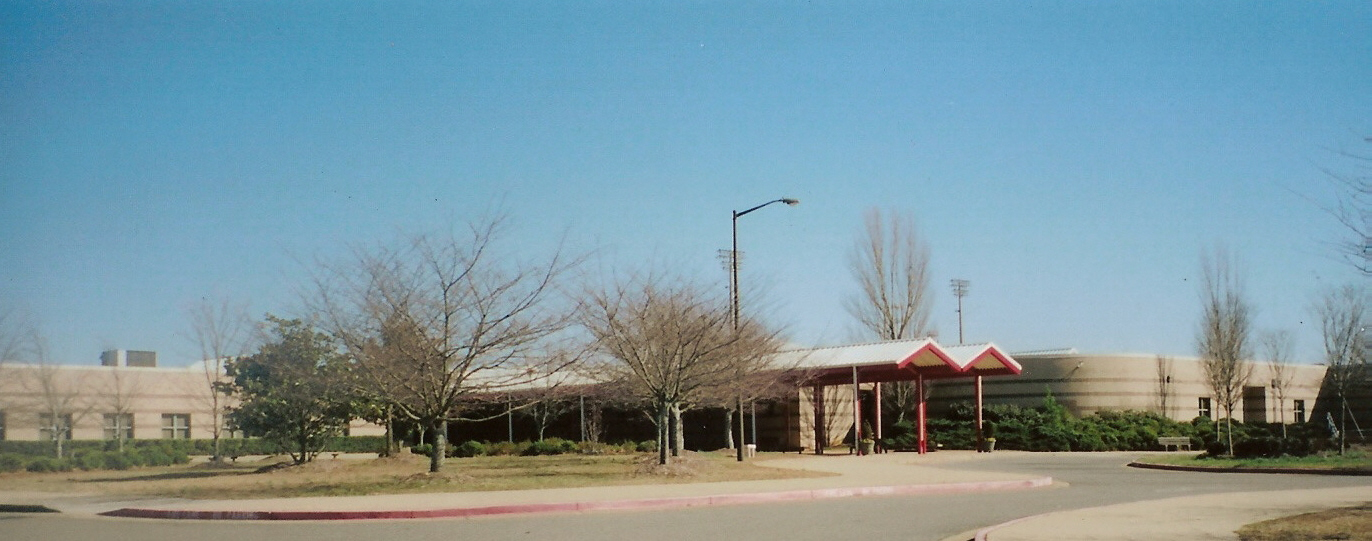
- Main entrance of Roswell High School in 2007

Location
- 11595 King Road; Roswell, Georgia 30075; United States; 34°03′46″N 84°22′53″W

Information
- Type: Public
- Motto: Truth and Honor
- Established: 1838; 188 years ago
- School district: Fulton County School System
- CEEB code: 112625
- NCES School ID: 130228002119
- Principal: Rako Morrissey
- Faculty: 123.10 (on an FTE basis)
- Grades: 9–12
- Enrollment: 2,036 (2023–2024)
- Student to teacher ratio: 16.54
- Campus: Suburban, 54 acres (0.2185 km^{2})
- Colors: Kelly green and white
- Nickname: Hornets
- Rival: Milton High School
- Accreditation: Southern Association of Colleges and Schools
- Newspaper: The Sting News
- Yearbook: Mimosan
- Website: www.fultonschools.org/Roswellhs

Roswell High School (RHS) is a public high school in Roswell, Georgia, United States established in 1838.[1] It serves most of the city of Roswell west of Georgia State Route 400 and the city of Mountain Park, as well as small portions of Alpharetta and Milton. Roswell High School neighbors both Fellowship Christian School and Blessed Trinity Catholic High School. It is the oldest of Fulton County's schools in the northern portion of the county, opening before Milton High School (1921), and Chattahoochee High School (1991). Roswell is currently on its third campus and sixth schoolhouse, which opened in 1990. The current building is the oldest in-use high school building in north Fulton.

Roswell is a member of the Georgia High School Association (GHSA) and Region 4-AAAAAAA for athletic competition, as of the 2016–2017 academic year. The school's mascot is the Hornet, and the school colors are green and white. Roswell offers 16 different sports, comprising 23 varsity level teams. Eight of the Roswell Hornet teams have won state championships, totaling 20 overall. The most championships won by a single team is seven, accomplished by the girls' gymnastics program.

== History ==
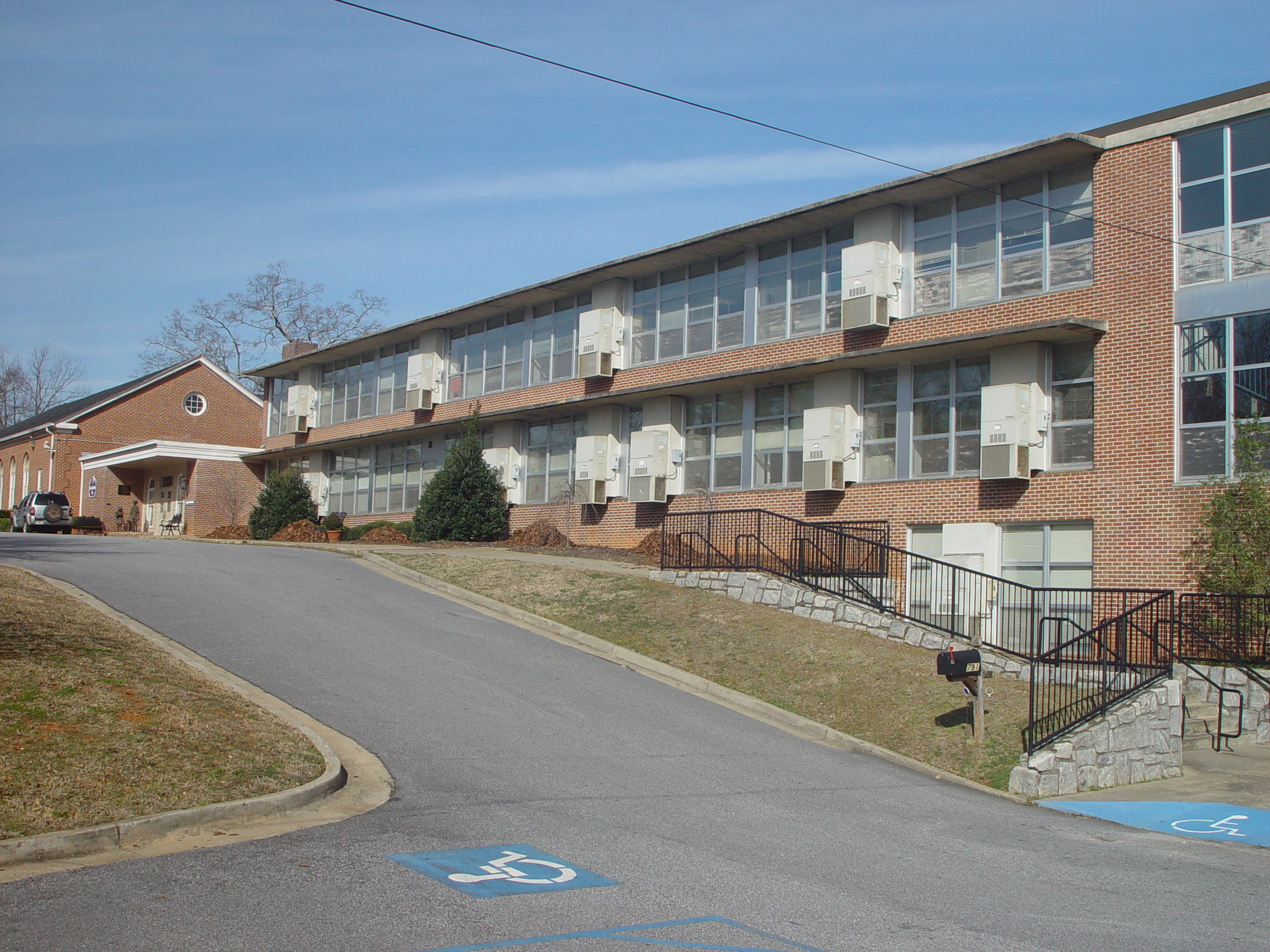
The building housing the original RHS campus was used as an alternative high school up until 2013 and is currently still used as a teaching museum for northern Fulton county schools.

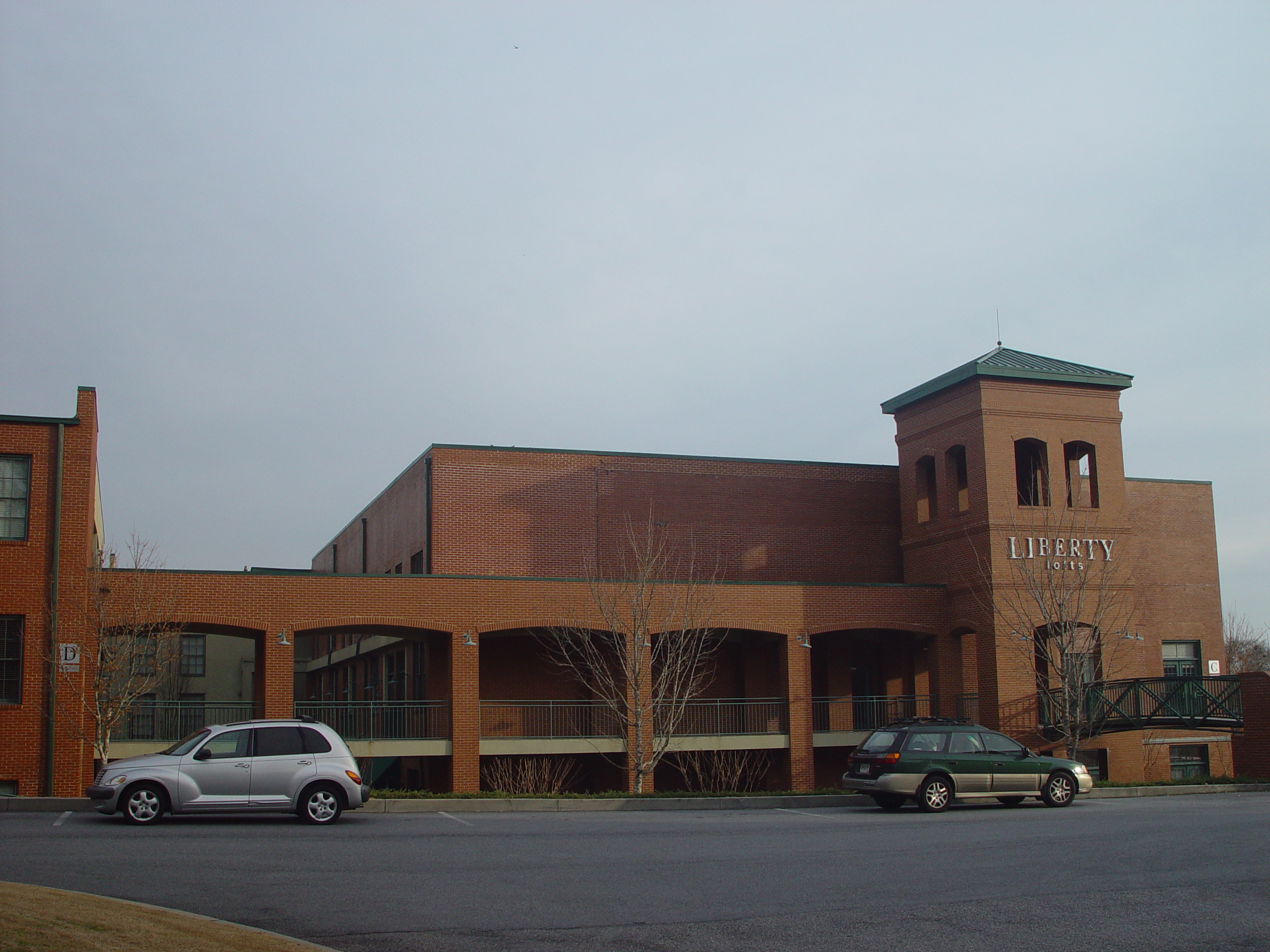
The former gymnasium in Roswell High's second campus (1954–1990) was converted into lofts in the 1990s.

Roswell High School first opened in 1838 as The Academy and then The Roswell School, and is the oldest high school in Fulton County north of the Chattahoochee River. Like the city of Roswell, the school bears the name of Roswell King. King founded the cotton mill that would eventually be the city's economic backbone for much of its early history. The immediate predecessor to Roswell High School was the Roswell Public School on Mimosa Boulevard, which housed grades 1–10 and opened in the 1892 after the Georgia General Assembly passed Act No. 51 on December 20, 1892, allowing the city to elect a school board and levy taxes for support of the school. Students from outside the city limits were required to pay tuition. In 1896, the city council and mayor were authorized by the state to issue $5,000 in bonds to build a new school building.

In 1914, the existing school was torn down and two new structures were built. Since schools were segregated at that time, a two-story brick building was constructed on Mimosa Boulevard to house the white students in grades 1 through 10, and a one-room wooden building was built on Pleasant Hill Avenue for black students in grades 1 through 7. The Pleasant Hill facility also served as a meeting place for a local lodge and the Pleasant Hill Baptist Church until the church built its own facility across the street in 1922. Grade 11 was added in the 1920s to the Mimosa Boulevard school. Black students who progressed past grade 7 could then attend Washington High School in Atlanta.

During the Great Depression, the city of Roswell was annexed into Fulton County from Cobb County as part of its 1932 combination with Milton County and Campbell County. Roswell students in grades ten and eleven were then sent to Milton High School in Alpharetta or North Fulton High School in Atlanta to finish their secondary education (which ended upon completion of grade 11). In 1949, the Mimosa Boulevard building was demolished, and a new school was built on the existing site to allow the 10th and 11th grades to return to Roswell and students were divided within the school between elementary and high school grades. G.W. Adams was the first principal after the division and oversaw the addition of more rooms to the school over the next few years. During this growth, the Baptist, Presbyterian and Methodist churches also located on Mimosa Boulevard were used to house auxiliary classrooms. Also in 1949–1950, the high school began participating in athletics with a varsity basketball team and other senior high school extracurricular activities. In 1950, Roswell High School added grade 12 as part of the statewide standard for high schools, and played its first varsity football season. The first graduating 12th grade class was in the spring of 1951. Prior to that year, students graduated in 10th and 11th grades.

Construction began nearby on Alpharetta Highway near the present-day Roswell City Hall on a new campus. That facility opened in the fall of 1954 and allowed the high school (grades 8–12) to physically separate from the elementary school (grades 1–7). Roswell High's second campus was designed by the architecture firm Stevens & Wilkinson, which innovated school designs and used a "finger plan" to improve functionality of the school. It had a capacity of 400 students and had facilities for industrial arts, a shop, music halls, science labs, an art room, an indoor gymnasium, athletic fields, a football stadium, and a track. The School started getting crowded in the early 70s. This forced Fulton county to establish Crestwood High School to relieve it. The School also relieved similar overcrowding at North Springs Charter School of Arts and Sciences. The primary school remained in the Mimosa Boulevard building as Roswell Elementary. As of 2007, the brick elementary building is part of an expanded structure still owned by the Fulton County School System, and it housed the Crossroads Second Chance North Alternative School until 2013 and still serves as the Teaching Museum North. Roswell High remained at the Alpharetta Highway campus until the fall of 1990 when the current campus on King Road was opened.

== Current campus ==
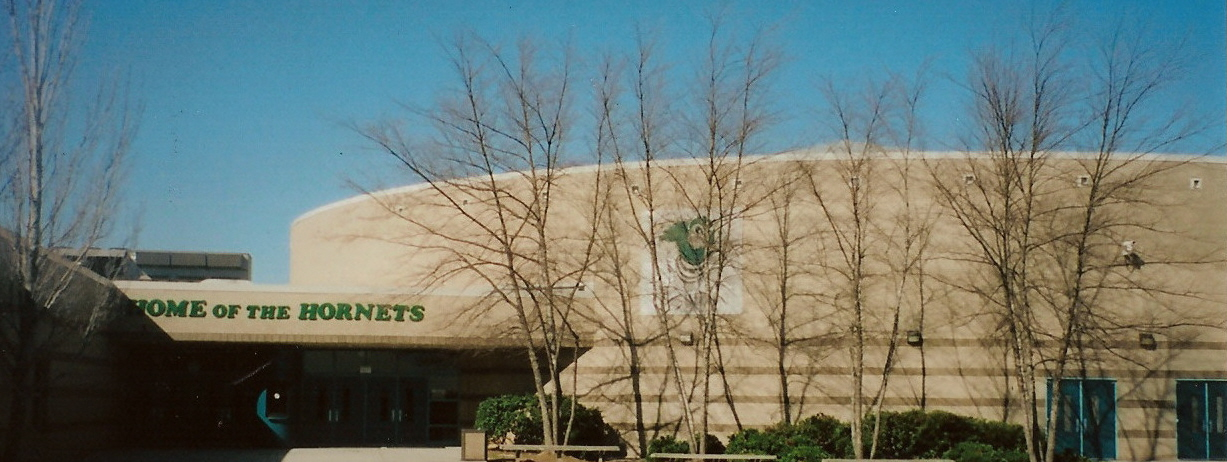
Side entrance to Roswell High School. The gymnasium is visible with its domed roof.

The current campus is the third that Roswell High School has occupied. It opened in the fall of 1990 on King Road, just off of Highway 92, with an enrollment of nearly 2,000 students. It is the oldest high school building in North Fulton. The new campus was expanded with a football stadium and softball field added in 1994 and an auditorium in 1995, paid for by the RHS Foundation. The campus includes science, computer, video, and cosmetology labs; baseball and softball fields, a stadium for football and soccer, a lacrosse field, an additional practice field, a dome style gymnasium, a cross country trail, and lighted tennis courts for athletics.

In 2008 the Roswell gymnasium was named one of the top high school gyms in the nation. Cited were the domed rotunda, the hanging four sided scoreboard, and locker room facilities.

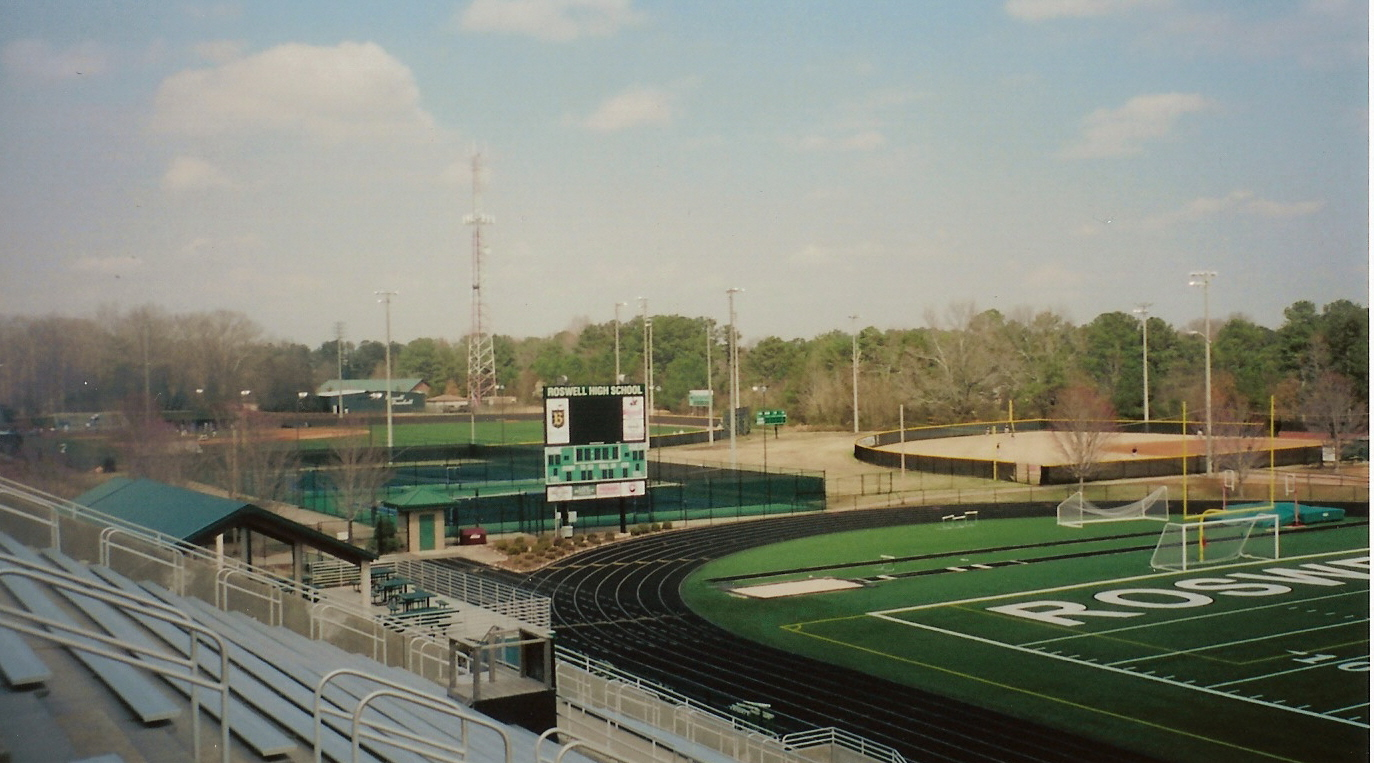
Roswell's athletic fields as seen from the stadium. Visible are the baseball field, softball field, tennis courts and north end zone of the football stadium.

On February 2, 2007, Roswell High had a groundbreaking ceremony for an expansion project. The 23,851-square-foot (2,215.8 m^{2}) expansion added ten new classrooms, including science labs and a new band room. This increased the school to a 1,900 student official capacity with the state. The addition also reduced some of the need for portable classrooms, but portable units were still used after the expansion to handle Roswell's enrollment (2400 students as of 2007). Construction officially began on February 5, 2007. The addition was paid for by a one-cent special-purpose local-option sales tax (SPLOST). Additional improvements to RHS for additional safety and security features, technology and curriculum equipment enhancements, and athletic facilities upgrades were to be implemented as part of the third SPLOST, approved by Fulton County voters on March 20, 2007.

== Academics ==
RHS is a part of the Fulton County School System and is accredited by the Southern Association of Colleges and Schools and the Georgia Department of Education.

Roswell was named a National Blue Ribbon School in 1997–1998 by the United States Department of Education. It was also designated a Georgia School of Excellence in 1996.

26 Advanced Placement (AP) classes are offered, and SAT as well as ACT scores regularly exceed the national and state average. For the 2005–2006 school year, Roswell's average SAT score was 1663 with the new SAT scoring system, which ranked Roswell third in the Fulton County School System and sixth in Metro Atlanta. The Georgia state average was 1477, while the national average was 1518. 477 students took AP exams in 2005, with 84% receiving the necessary score (3 or higher) to earn college credit. Nationally, only 60% score high enough to earn college credits. Three RHS students were named National Merit Scholars in 2005.

Roswell's academic success has brought national recognition. In 2006, the school was ranked the No. 472 school in Newsweek magazine's top 1,200 schools, ranking in the top 3% nationally. Roswell was third on the list among Fulton County's 12 high schools.

Roswell offers a unique curriculum with many electives not offered anywhere else in the county. The school's unique course offerings include the Career Tech diploma track, robotics, psychology, archaeology, and foreign languages. The Foreign Language department offers French, Spanish, Latin, and Japanese, and was honored in the January 2007 issue of Atlanta Magazine for offering the most foreign language courses in the Atlanta area. RHS students participated in the 2007 Annual Japanese Challenge Academic Bowl and won the most awards of any school at the competition.

In 2007, RHS Senior Maia Bageant was named as one of 141 Presidential Scholars by the United States Department of Education. In 2008, Roswell High was one of 23 Georgia schools recognized by state school superintendent Kathy Cox as an AP Merit School (20% of students taking AP exams, 50% or more of those receiving a score of three or higher). Also in 2008, Roswell High School student Ishna Sharma was named as one of only 139 Presidential Scholars. RHS student Anand Srinivasan received the Kroger Pinnacle Award in 2014, the top award given at the statewide annual Georgia Science and Engineering Fair. Likewise, student Saif Ali tied for first place in the state science fair in 2016.

U.S. News & World Report ranked Roswell High 162nd in its 2014 list of best high schools for the academic disciplines of Science, technology, engineering, and mathematics (STEM) and 339th on the 2014 list of best high schools in the United States.

=== Career Tech ===
The Career Tech department at Roswell High is made up of Broadcast and Video Production, Cosmetology, Family and Consumer Sciences, Diversified Technology, Pre-Engineering, Business Education, and JROTC. Through this department, students may take three consecutive years of one of the branches to obtain a Career Technology High School Diploma in place of a College Prep Diploma. Courses cover diverse topics such as culinary arts, business, computers, interior design, and introduction to education and early childhood care.

==== Broadcast and Video Production ====
The Broadcast and Video Production department is designed to teach students about the television industry. Using a hands-on method, students learn about all aspects of television from pre-production to production to post-production. The facility is made up of a working television studio, a large control room, six edit rooms (each equipped with both linear and non-linear editing systems), a radio station, and a normal classroom. Students in the program learn to produce everything from commercials and PSAs to dramas, news shows, and sporting events. The advanced classes produce a weekly news show, the Morning Buzz, which airs at the beginning of the day. The Broadcast and Video department supports the student-run radio station WRHS the Hive, the film club, and the yearly School House Rock concert.

=== Rifle team ===
The Rifle Team is jointly run by the Roswell High School JROTC program and the Athletics Department, and represents the school in the Olympic sport of riflery. The team won the Region 6 championship six straight years between 1996 and 2001. The team finished second in the state in 2000 finishing with a score of 1142. State champion East Coweta High School finished with a score of 1150.

=== Fine arts ===
Roswell High School offers fine arts opportunities in art, band, chorus, drama, and orchestra. The groups meet throughout the year as elective classes and extracurricular activities, and hold many events. These include performances at football games, murals painted in the school's halls, concerts, plays, and a spring musical jointly put on by the drama and choral departments.

The drama department annually hosts Short Attention Span Theatre, featuring plays, shorts, and monologues which are written, cast, directed, and produced by RHS students.

==== Chorus ====
Roswell Choruses have performed on numerous occasions for the Georgia Music Educator's Association and sang at the 2003 Southern Division of the Music Educator's National Conference in Savannah, Georgia. The Singing Hornets have performed concerts at Notre Dame, St. Peter's Basilica, Carnegie Hall, and Disney World. They have performed with professional orchestras, including the Atlanta Symphony Youth Orchestra and Orchestra Atlanta. Each year, the Roswell Choral Music Program receives invitations for students to participate in the Georgia All-State Chorus and the Governor's Honors Program. Ensembles include the Chamber Singers, Vocal Jazz, Advanced Women's, and Advanced Men's Choirs.

==== Band ====
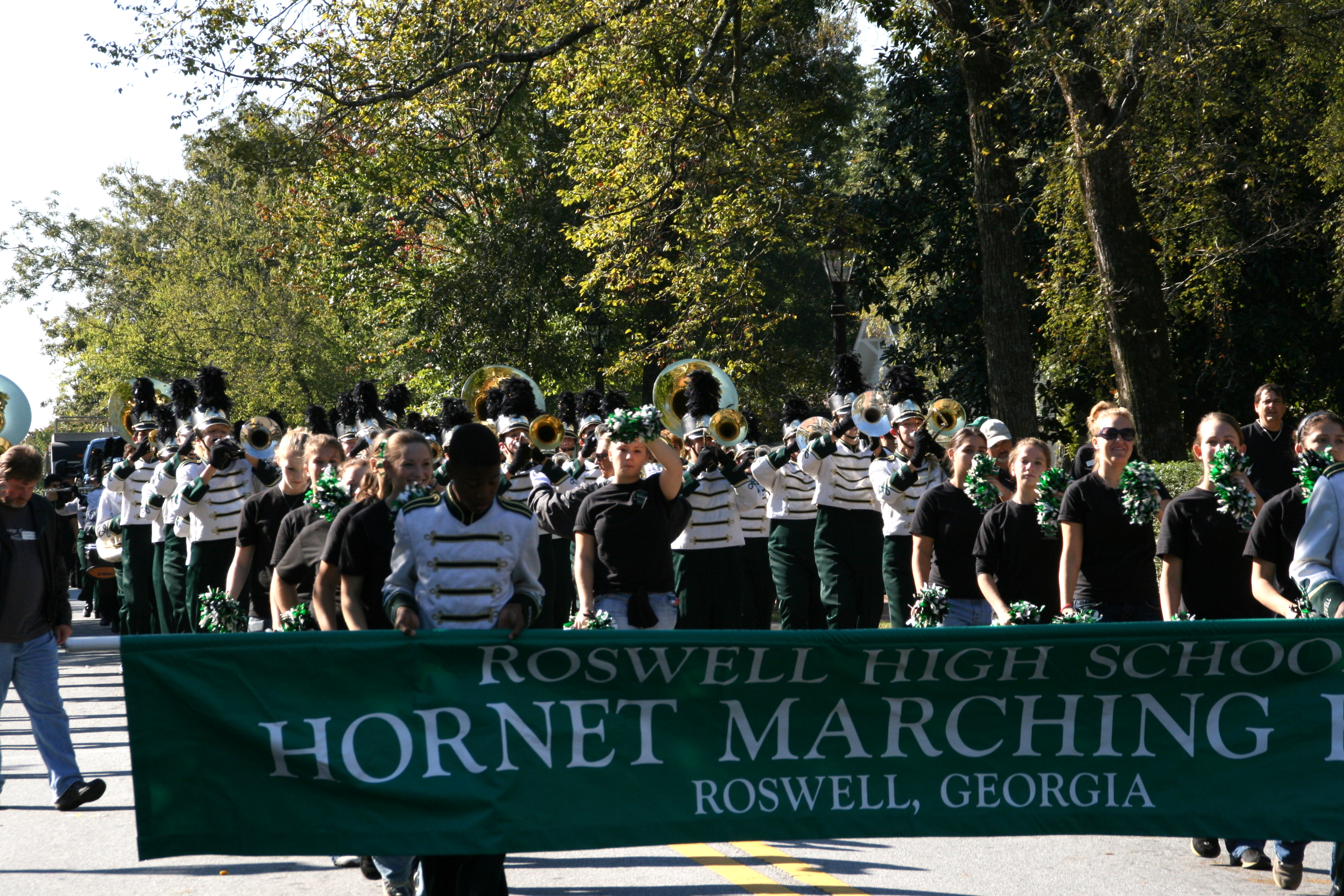
The Roswell High School Marching Band participating in the 2007 Roswell Youth Day Parade

The Roswell High School band department contains the marching band, wind ensemble, symphonic band, pep band, jazz band, and percussion ensemble. The marching band performs for all varsity football games and has competitions throughout the fall, as well as parade appearances. The marching band competes in Class AAA and in 2008 placed third overall in the Georgia Invitational Band Championship. In 2009 the wind ensemble, which was one of only three selected, took part in the Honor Bands of Georgia program hosted at Columbus State University in Columbus, Georgia. The program is an educational opportunity for the bands participating and is meant to further music education in the state.

== Extracurricular activities ==
=== Athletics ===
The Roswell High mascot is the Hornet, and the school colors are green, black, and white. The Hornets compete in 16 sports at the varsity level, with additional teams competing at the junior varsity and 9th grade level. 11 sports are available to boys, 10 are for girls, and 2 are co-ed. Overall, 23 teams compete at varsity level, with 43 total.

The Hornets have won multiple state titles in athletics, including three each in football and baseball, and two in boys' basketball. Roswell's most successful girls' team is gymnastics, which has won seven state championships (1997, 2000–2003, 2005, 2007). In 1970–71 Roswell completed a three-peat in the GHSA, winning a state title (including a back-to-back campaign in baseball) in baseball, basketball, and football within 12 months of each other. In total the Roswell Hornets have won 19 team state championship titles in the school's 23 sports.

Since its inception, Roswell's traditional rival has been Milton, the oldest high school in northern Fulton County. The Roswell/Milton series is the most-played high school football rivalry in metro Atlanta, with the 2014 game marking the sixtieth meeting between the schools. The two have competed since 1950 in every sport the two schools offer. In 1963 a fight broke out between the fans of the schools at a football game and the series was banned for several years. The football series then went uninterrupted from 1970 to 1997 but was temporarily ended when the GHSA moved Milton to a different Region, which made scheduling difficult. The series was reinstated in 2000 when Milton and Roswell were again in Region 6-AAAAA. Since 1950, Roswell has held a 34–21–1 advantage over their archrival in football, including winning seven straight from 2001 to 2007. The 2008 meeting was won by Milton, 20–19. Roswell won a series record 14 straight games from 1983 to 1995. Roswell's very first football game was against Milton, a 14–0 win on September 22, 1950. The largest margin of victory in the series also belongs to Roswell, a 45–0 victory on October 26, 2007.

In lacrosse, the series records are the opposite; Roswell has a losing record to its archrival in lacrosse. The closest sport in the rivalry is gymnastics, in which the two teams have combined for eleven state titles (seven Roswell, four Milton) and for seven years from 1997 to 2003 one of the two teams won every state championship. In other sports with records available, Roswell's boys' soccer team has gone 5–0–1 against Milton since 2004 while the girls' soccer team has gone 2–4 against the Eagles. 2008 saw the Hornet soccer teams record a sweep over the Milton Eagles for the second straight year. On October 22, 2008, The Atlanta Journal-Constitution named the Roswell-Milton rivalry as the seventh best football rivalry in the state. Reasons cited included the age of the rivalry and the fight in 1963. In 2013 the rivals played for the state baseball championship. Milton ultimately ended up winning the state championship in extra innings by one run in front of an overflow crowd. It marked the second straight year a team from the rival schools faced off for a state title, as the girls' lacrosse teams did so in 2012.

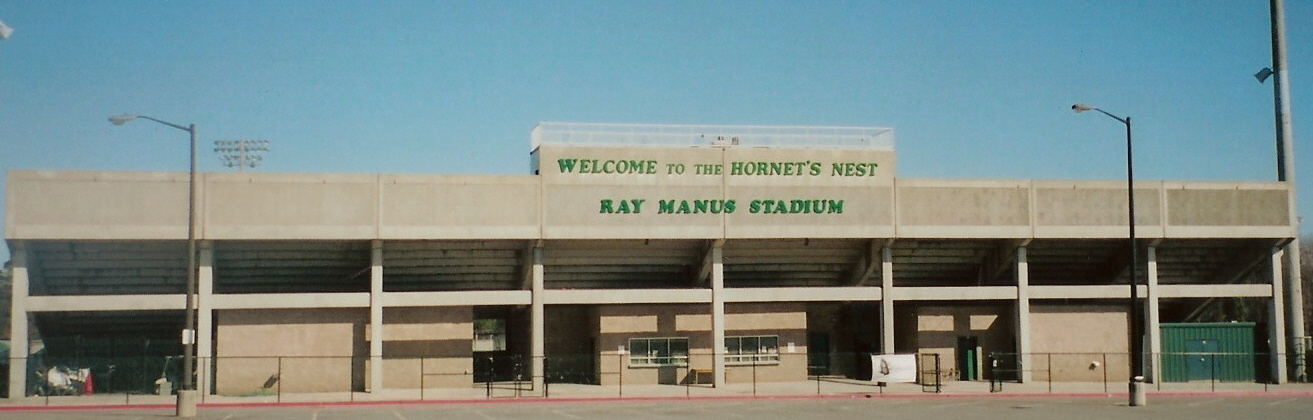
Ray Manus Stadium is home to the football, soccer, and track and field programs.

Roswell has also developed a strong rivalry with Centennial High School, the city's other public high school, in which the two teams play for the Roswell Cup in football, the series starting in 2000. In soccer, Centennial is the bigger rival than Milton. Roswell Football holds a 9–2 record over Centennial. On the soccer pitch, Roswell girls have a 3–3 record with the Knights since 2004, while the boys hold a 1–5 record during that time period.

Other significant rivals include Chattahoochee, Lassiter, and Alpharetta. Blessed Trinity is Roswell's closest rival as the two are less than a mile apart; it is also the newest rival. The two schools started an annual series in soccer in 2007. They have met three times in soccer, with the boys' record being tied 1–1–1 and the girls' record being 0–1–2 for Roswell.

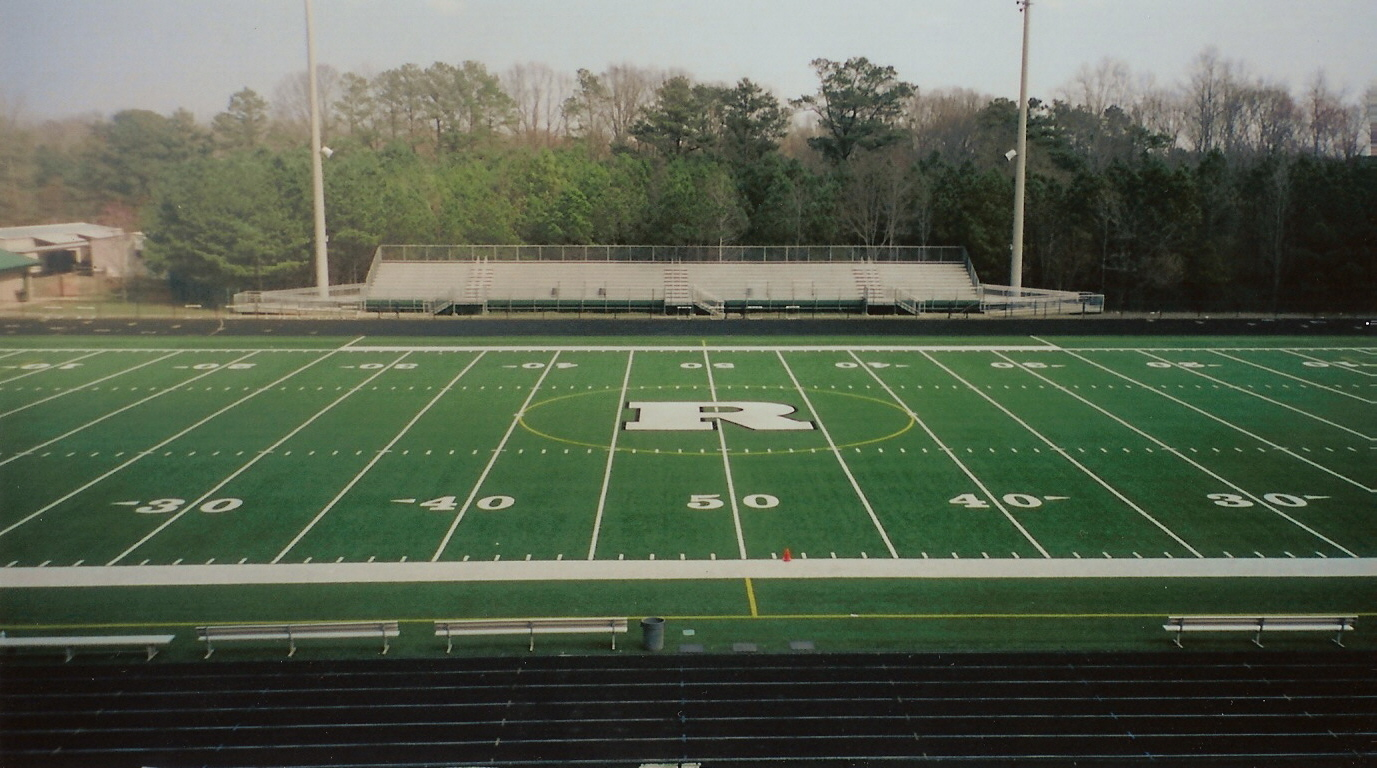
Roswell's new Sprintturf field was added to the stadium in 2004. It was jointly paid by the football and soccer booster clubs.

As of the 2014–2015 season, Roswell varsity teams compete in the eight team Region 5-AAAAAA. The AAAAAA classification was created for the 2012–2013 season by the GHSA for the largest schools in the state. Roswell was previously a member of Region 6-AAAAA since its inception in 2000 with the addition of class AAAAA, although Roswell's region opponents have varied. Prior to joining AAAAA, Roswell was in Region 6-AAAA for 12 years from 1988 until 1999. The current members of Region 6 include county rivals Alpharetta, Centennial, and Milton. Teams from neighboring Cobb are Campbell, Kell, Lassiter, Pope, Walton, and Wheeler. Region realignment for the 2010–2011 school year kept Roswell in Region 6, along with Alpharetta, Centennial, and Milton. North Fulton school Northview joined the other four Fulton schools, along with the North Forsyth Raiders and West Forsyth Wolverines of Forsyth County, to create a seven-team region.

Roswell offers all GHSA sponsored sports. Various programs offer teams at the varsity, JV, and freshman levels. Such sports for boys include football, baseball, basketball and lacrosse. Girls' teams with all three levels are basketball and volleyball. Sports offering varsity and JV teams include cross country, golf, soccer, tennis, and track and field for both genders. Softball and lacrosse are such programs for girls while wrestling is such a program for boys. Swimming & diving is only varsity for both genders, while gymnastics is offered at the varsity level for girls. Roswell offers two co-ed sports, competition cheerleading and riflery; both are solely varsity teams.

==== Traditions ====
Every fall students are encouraged to wear their class colors on football game day Fridays to show their school spirit. The days of Homecoming Week are themed, and students dress up to win spirit points for their class, culminating in the Friday class color day and pep rally. On Wednesday or Thursday night of Homecoming Week, students decorate the halls of the school by class to reflect the theme of the dance. Each hall is judged, with the winning class receiving spirit points. On game days, the Roswell Marching Band plays the school's fight song as they march through the halls. Roswell's fight song is a version of the "Washington and Lee Swing." Seniors dress up in camouflage every Friday for school and for the football games.

The senior class of 2010 brought the "Flour Toss" tradition to Roswell. At every kickoff of the Friday football games, students anticipate the kick, each holding fistfuls of white flour. As soon as the player kicks the ball, hands go up in the air, releasing the flour, creating a cloud of white to welcome the opposing team.

==== Football ====
Roswell High School football logo

Roswell's football team has won three State Championships (1968, 1970, and 2006), three State Runners-up (1956, 2015, and 2016), and ten Region Championships, the latest in 2016. Since 1950 Roswell has a combined record of 405–244–7. Roswell football history started in 1950 when a spring practice and game was held. During the fall of that year, Roswell posted a 4–2 record, including two wins over archrival Milton.

Coach Bill Yoast began building Roswell's football success when he came to coach the Hornets in 1954. In two years, he got Roswell to the 1956 State Championship game, which Roswell lost to Monticello. He stayed at the school until 1960, when he left for Virginia.

Roswell's first and so far only undefeated season was in 1968, when sophomore quarterback Jeff Bower led the Hornets to a 13–0 season and the football team's first State Championship. It was the most wins for a season in school history until 2006, when that state championship team went 13–1–1, tying the 1968 team in wins. Two years later, in 1970, Roswell won a state title with a 12–2 record with Jeff Bower again leading the team. He also won state championships in baseball in 1970 and 1971 and basketball in 1971. Bower would go on to a long career as a football coach, most notably as the head coach of Southern Miss from 1990 to 2007.

Roswell's coach with the best record is Ray Manus, who was head coach for 23 seasons (1975–97). and had a record of 141–102–1. After retiring as head coach, Coach Manus returned to the team as an assistant in 2004, and the stadium was officially named after him that year as well. Though he never won a state title as head coach, Manus was on the coaching staff for all three titles.

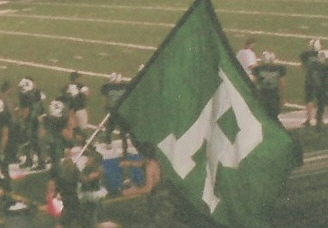
The Roswell High School flag is carried by a senior after every touchdown. Here, fans celebrate a touchdown against archrival Milton.

In 2006, after a 35-year absence from being at the top of the state, the Hornets recaptured a state title for the first time in 36 years. The team finished the regular season 9–1 and the No. 2 seed in the playoffs from Region 6-AAAAA. Roswell continued to win in the state playoffs, including a 10–9 win over defending State Runner-up Brookwood High School, and won the right to play for a State Championship by defeating Tift County in the Georgia Dome state semi-finals. Roswell was eventually crowned state co-champion after a controversial 14–14 tie against the Peachtree Ridge Lions. The Hornets finished the season 13–1–1. Roswell players won many post-season accolades, including quarterback Dustin Taliaferro, who made The Atlanta Journal-Constitution and Associated Press All-State First team, and running back Alex Daniel (All-State Honorable Mention).

The Roswell Hornets began the 2007 season ranked No. 1 in Class AAAAA and nationally ranked by three publications, including a No. 8 ranking by Rivals.com. The Hornets finished 2007 with a 10–3 record. Of the three losses Walton made the state semi-finals and Lowndes became state champions. The Hornets finished the season ranked No. 6 in the state by the AJC and No. 5 by the AP. Eight members of the 2007 football team received collegiate scholarships, and six of those signees will attend Division I Football Bowl Subdivision schools.

Coach Tim McFarlin resigned as the head coach in the spring of 2008. Over his ten-year tenure as head coach, Roswell compiled a record of 82–34–1, won a share of the 5A state championship in 2006, reached the state high school playoffs seven times and won two region championships. In 2006, he was named State AAAAA Coach of the Year. McFarlin was an assistant football coach with the Hornets for 17 years before becoming head coach in 1998. Roswell hired Leo Barker, defensive coordinator under McFarlin for the 2006 and 2007 seasons, as the head coach for the 2008 season. Barker was the tenth head coach of the Roswell Hornets and served in that position for the 2009 and 2010 seasons before resigning.

Leo Barker's first season at Roswell, 2008, ended with a 5–5 record and the Hornets just missing the playoffs. In his second season the Hornets rebounded and had a 9–1 regular season record, finishing second in Region 6-AAAAA behind Lassiter who defeated the Hornets 45–24. The Hornets made it to the second round of the playoffs, falling to the No. 1 state ranked Grayson High School 24–14, giving Roswell a 10–2 record for 2009.

Justin Sanderson, the assistant head coach under Barker, was promoted to head coach for the 2011 season. After compiling a 3–17 record in 2 seasons, Sanderson was replaced after the 2012 season with John Ford. As of the 2014 season, Ford is the current head football coach at RHS.

==== Gymnastics ====
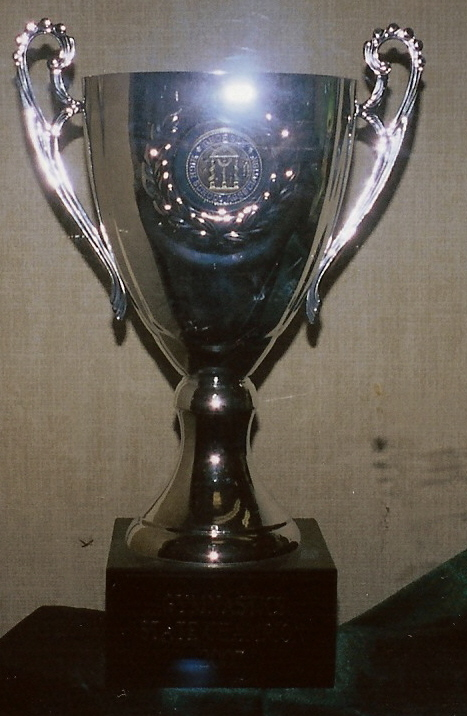
Close up of Roswell's 2007 state championship trophy in gymnastics.

Roswell's gymnastics program has won a total of seven state championships since 1997, including four straight from 2000 to 2003. Roswell's seven state titles is second in the sports history behind only Lakeside, Dekalb's nine. The 2006 team finished third in the state, and in 2007 Roswell won their seventh state championship in the sport on April 27 at Westminster, defeating archrival Milton by only 1.55 points despite having no gymnasts winning an individual championship. The 2007 team, however, placed at least one gymnast in the top six of each apparatus, including Annie Turner, who placed second in the All-Around, third on vault and bars, and fifth on floor. Two Roswell gymnasts finished second and sixth on the balance beam. In 2008 the Hornets finished fourth in the state.

==== Lacrosse ====
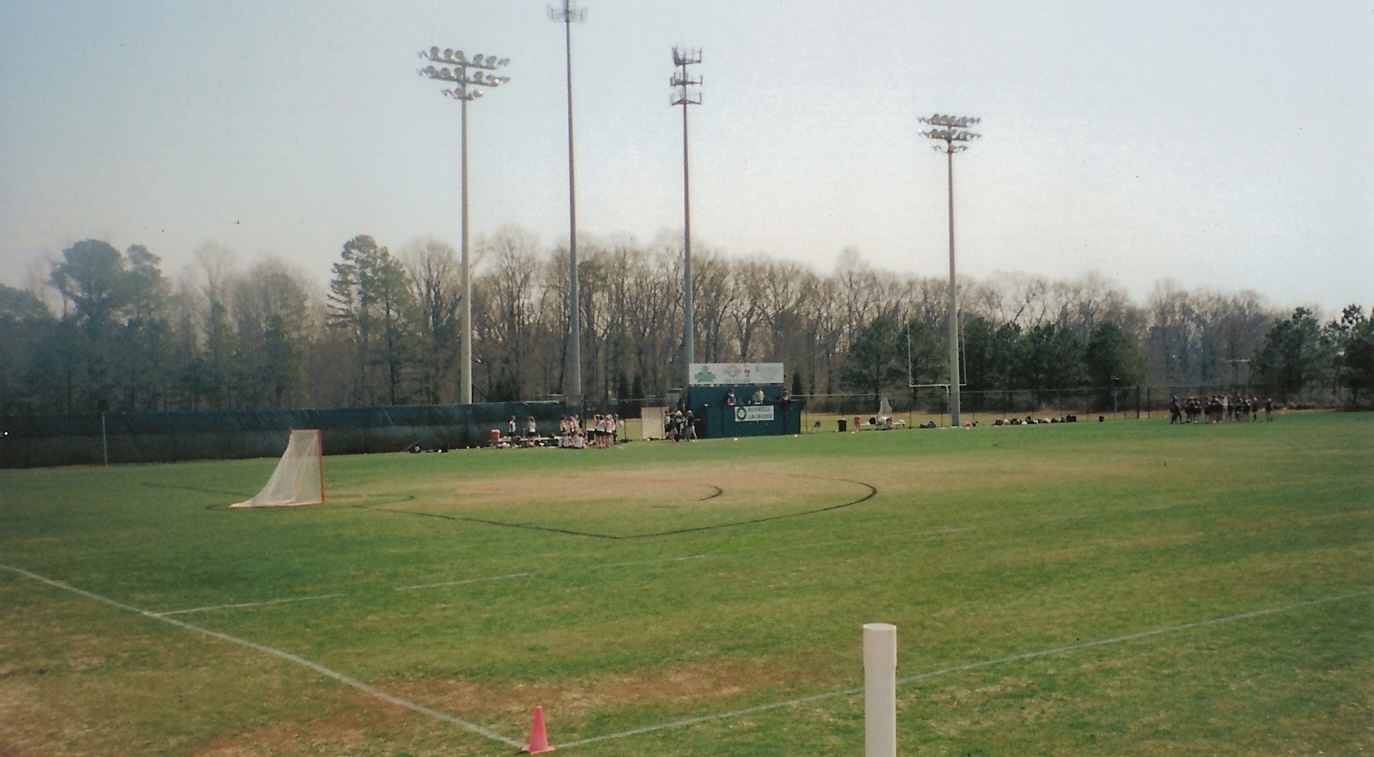
The Roswell Lacrosse Complex first opened in 2004.

Along with rival Centennial, Roswell became one of the first two public schools in the state to offer lacrosse in 1999. Roswell was the host of the first GHSA sponsored tournament in May 2002. The school was one of only six to field a women's team in 1999, along with Centennial and several private schools. The 2006 Boys Lacrosse team made the state playoffs for the first time by finishing second in their region, and made it to the second round. In 2008, the Roswell Lacrosse program added a freshman boys' team, the first such team in the state. Another milestone for the Roswell Lacrosse team came in 2008 when Michael Bender was named an All-American, the first Roswell lacrosse player to be given that honor.

In 2013, the boys' team took a big step forward, making it to the state semi-finals before falling to Lambert 17–6. The following year, Roswell went into the state playoffs as a 2 seed from Region 2. They beat East Coweta in the first round, and then beat their cross-town rival and the defending state champion, Centennial. They would then beat Walton at home, which led to a rematch of the previous years semi-final match up against Lambert in the State Championship. In Ray Manus Stadium, with over 5,000 fans in attendance, Roswell captured its first Boys' Lacrosse State Championship, defeating the Lambert Longhorns 6–5. They finished the season 17–3 and were ranked by The Atlanta Journal-Constitution as the No. 1 team in the state of Georgia. They were ranked the No. 8 team in the South by Nike.

The Roswell girls' lacrosse team made the state playoffs for the first time in 2009. They made the second round of the state playoffs, falling to eventual champion Chattahoochee. The team finished with a 13–5–1 record and ranked No. 5 in the state.

==== Other athletic programs ====
The Hornet baseball program has won three state titles. The team has been a state playoff participant and has been ranked nationally by such sources as USA Today Top 100 and Baseball America. For the 2007 season, Roswell's team was ranked in the pre-season nationally. The Hornets' state championships in baseball were won in 1970, 1971, and 1986. They finished second in the state in 1969, 1976, and 2013. The 1986 state championship team holds the record for the most wins in program history at 29.

Roswell's boys' golf team has one state title, taking first place in 1990. In 2006, Roswell finished second when rain canceled the second of the two-round tournament. Coach Tim McFarlin led the 2006 State Runner-up team just seven months before taking the football team to the 2006 State Championship.

Roswell's track & field program has won two boys' state championships in 1959 and in 1961. The 1959 State Championship in track was the school's first state championship in any sport. The program hosts the annual Roswell Relays track meet and the Region 6-AAAAA Track Championships. The cross country program saw the girls' team finish eighth in the state in 2007. Roswell also won a Track and Field State Championship in 1961. The track team partners annually with the Rotary Club of Roswell to hold the Roswell Rotary Relays.

Roswell won two state championships in boys basketball in 1971 and 1997 and in slow-pitch softball in 1992. The softball state title was the first for a girls' team at Roswell. The Girls Tennis Team also captured a state title in 2012.

=== Clubs ===
As of the 2012–2013 academic year, RHS offers 72 clubs, 11 academic teams, and service clubs.

Clubs include academic honor societies, political interests, service clubs, social/general interest clubs, and non-varsity sport clubs. Service clubs include Key Club, Anchor Club, Animal Rescue Club, and the Habitat For Humanity Club, which raises funds and builds houses in conjunction with the local Habitat chapter. Academic clubs include Art Club, Art National Honor Society, Beta Club, and National Honor Society. Political interest clubs are the Peace Activists Club, Young Democrats, Young Republicans, and Shanti, which attempts to eliminate teenage apathy. Competitive clubs include the two-time state champion Fencing Team, Roswell Ice Hockey Club, Ultimate Frisbee Club, Policy Debate Team, Breakdance Team, Unique Dance team, and the Robotics Team. The robotics team hosts the oldest active FRC team in Georgia (Team 832).

=== Publications and media outlets ===
Established in 1983, The Sting is the school's official student newspaper and is a member of the Georgia Scholastic Press Association. The monthly publication has been recognized on multiple occasions by the GSPA and the Henry W. Grady College of Journalism and Mass Communication at the University of Georgia. The newspaper features news, editorials, opinions, features, entertainment, and sports. The staff also maintains the paper's related website.

The student literary magazine the Helicon is produced by the school's literary magazine staff. The magazine is published once each semester and features student-created poetry, short stories, essays, photos, and artwork. The Helicon has also received multiple awards from the GSPA.

The student-published yearbook is the Mimosan, and the student-run radio station is WRHS The Hive.

== Notable people ==
Coach Bill Yoast, featured in the movie Remember the Titans, was a Roswell High football coach from 1954 to 1960 before leaving for Virginia. Game footage from Roswell is used in several scenes in the movie.

=== Notable alumni ===
- Kyle Buckley, Record Producer
- Jimmy Barthmaier, MLB baseball player
- Justin Bolli, professional golfer
- Jeff Bower, college football player and coach
- Jay Clark, college gymnastics coach
- Delilah Dawson, author
- Ty'Ron Hopper, NFL football player
- Alec Kessler, former NBA basketball player
- Anthonie Knapp, college football player
- Bryan Konietzko, animator
- Tre Lamar, NFL football player
- Richie Leone, CFL football player
- Ty Long, NFL football player
- Xavier McKinney, NFL football player
- Jermaine Phillips, NFL football player
- Tony Phillips, MLB baseball player
- Jim Powell, sportscaster
- Steve Prouty, special effects and make-up artist
- Mike Ramsey, MLB baseball player
- Ken Ray, MLB baseball player
- Chris Reis, NFL football player
- Alain Sergile, Olympic swimmer
- Tony Skole, college baseball coach
- Russell Vitale, hip-hop recording artist
- Malik Willis, NFL football player
