= Fulton County Charter High School of Mathematics and Science =

Location
- 2000 Holcomb Woods Parkway; Roswell, Georgia; United States; 34°1′12.77″N 84°18′32.2″W

Information
- Type: Public school
- Established: 2001
- Closed: 2004
- School district: Fulton County
- Principal: Gary Martin
- Grades: 9 - 11
- Enrollment: 210
- Colors: Blue & Silver
- Mascot: Panther
- Accreditation: sacs

Fulton County Charter High School of Mathematics and Science, also known as Math/Science High and MSH, was a high school in Roswell, Georgia, United States, established in 2001 and disbanded in the spring of 2004. As typical for charter schools, it was housed in an old furniture store, the charter school was built around New York City's Bronx High School of Science model.

The school enrolled 215 students in grades 9 through 11 during the 2003–04 school year.

== History ==
Only one student completed high school at MSHS, Gabriel Kassel. His degree was granted from another area high school, but all coursework was completed at the end of the Junior (third year) of the school's operation.

The building was subsequently leased and remodeled by the Atlanta Academy, a private K-8 elementary school in 2006. The Atlanta Academy remains in the facility, as of 2016.

== Enrollment ==
Enrollment was open to all high school students in Fulton County.

== Awards ==
- Website Design competition, 3rd place
- All-state Band (2001), 2 students
- Georgia Tech's Robojackets competition (Spring 2002), 5th place
- Odyssey of the Mind, regional (2004), 1st place
- Odyssey of the Mind, state (2004), 2nd place
- Georgia Science and Engineering Fair, state (2004), 1st place

== Clubs and Sports teams ==
- Art Club
- Basketball Team
- Baseball Team
- Chess Club
- Fellowship of Christian Athletes
- Golf Team
- Hockey Team
- Computer Club
- Newspaper
- Odyssey of the Mind
- Ping-Pong Club
- Robotics Team
- String Ensemble
- Tennis Team
- Volleyball Team
- Video Game Club
- Yearbook
