= Mike Ramsey (infielder) =

American baseball player (born 1954)

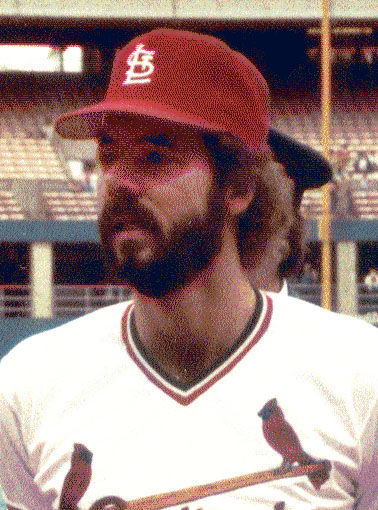
- Ramsey with the St. Louis Cardinals in 1983
- Second baseman / Shortstop
- Born: March 29, 1954 (age 72); Roanoke, Virginia, U.S.
- Batted: Switch Threw: Right

MLB debut
- September 4, 1978, for the St. Louis Cardinals

Last MLB appearance
- May 30, 1985, for the Los Angeles Dodgers

MLB statistics
- Batting avg: .240
- Home runs: 2
- Runs Batted In: 57
- Stats at Baseball Reference

Teams
- St. Louis Cardinals (1978, 1980–1984); Montreal Expos (1984); Los Angeles Dodgers (1985)

Career highlights and awards
- World Series champion (1982)

Michael Jeffrey Ramsey (born March 29, 1954) is an American former Major League Baseball infielder. He attended Appalachian State University.

== Career ==
Ramsey played for Roswell High School in Roswell, Georgia. He was drafted in the 26th round of the 1972 amateur draft by the Chicago Cubs, but did not sign. In 1975, Ramsey was again drafted, this time in the 3rd round by the St. Louis Cardinals. He spent the next several years coming up through the Cardinals minor league farm system with stops in Johnson City, Arkansas, and Springfield, Illinois. Ramsey eventually made his Major League debut with the Cardinals on September 4, 1978, and would play his final game with the Los Angeles Dodgers on May 30, 1985.

Ramsey was a member of the 1982 World Series Champion Cardinals team. In the series he went 0-for-1 with a run scored.
