= Archibald Smith Plantation Home =

Historic house in Georgia, United States

- Archibald Smith House
- U.S. National Register of Historic Places
- U.S. Historic district
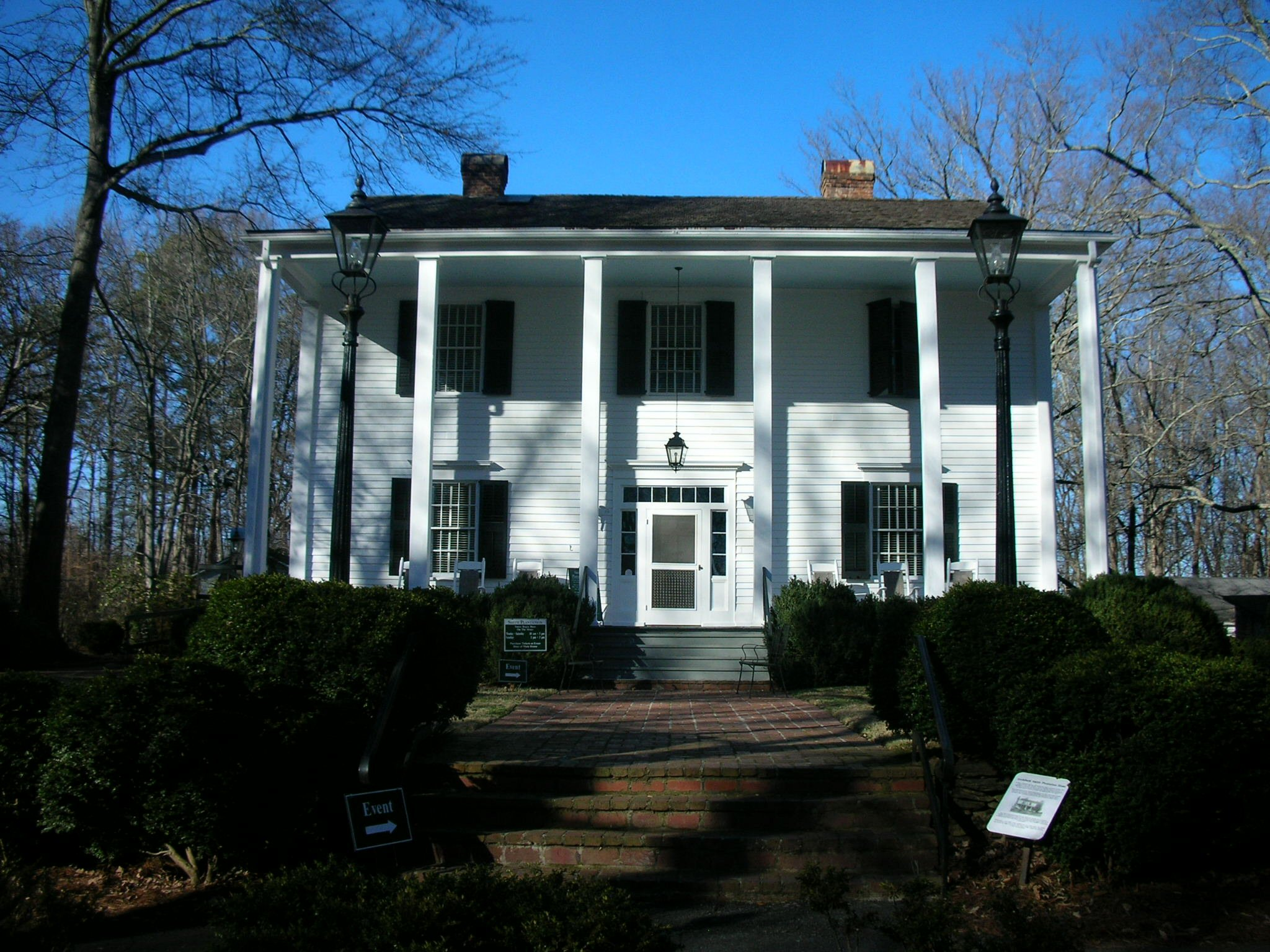
- Archibald Smith Plantation Home in February, 2008

- Location within Metro Atlanta Location within Georgia Location within the United States
- Location: 935 Alpharetta St., Roswell, Georgia, U.S.
- Coordinates: 34°1′26″N 84°21′36″W
- Built: 1845
- Architect: Denny Gentry
- Architectural style: Georgian
- NRHP reference No.: 06000740
- Added to NRHP: August 30, 2006

The Archibald Smith Plantation Home is a historic house in Roswell, Georgia, built in 1845. The home was built by one of Roswell's founders, Archibald Smith, and housed three generations of his family.

== Background ==
The home was restored by the third generation, Arthur and Mary Smith, in 1940. The home was sold to the City of Roswell in 1986 and opened to the public as a house museum in 1991.

In addition to the home, the grounds include a guest house, slave quarters, cookhouse, carriage house, barn, spring house and water well. The plantation was added to the National Register of Historic Places in 2006.
