= Fellowship Christian School =

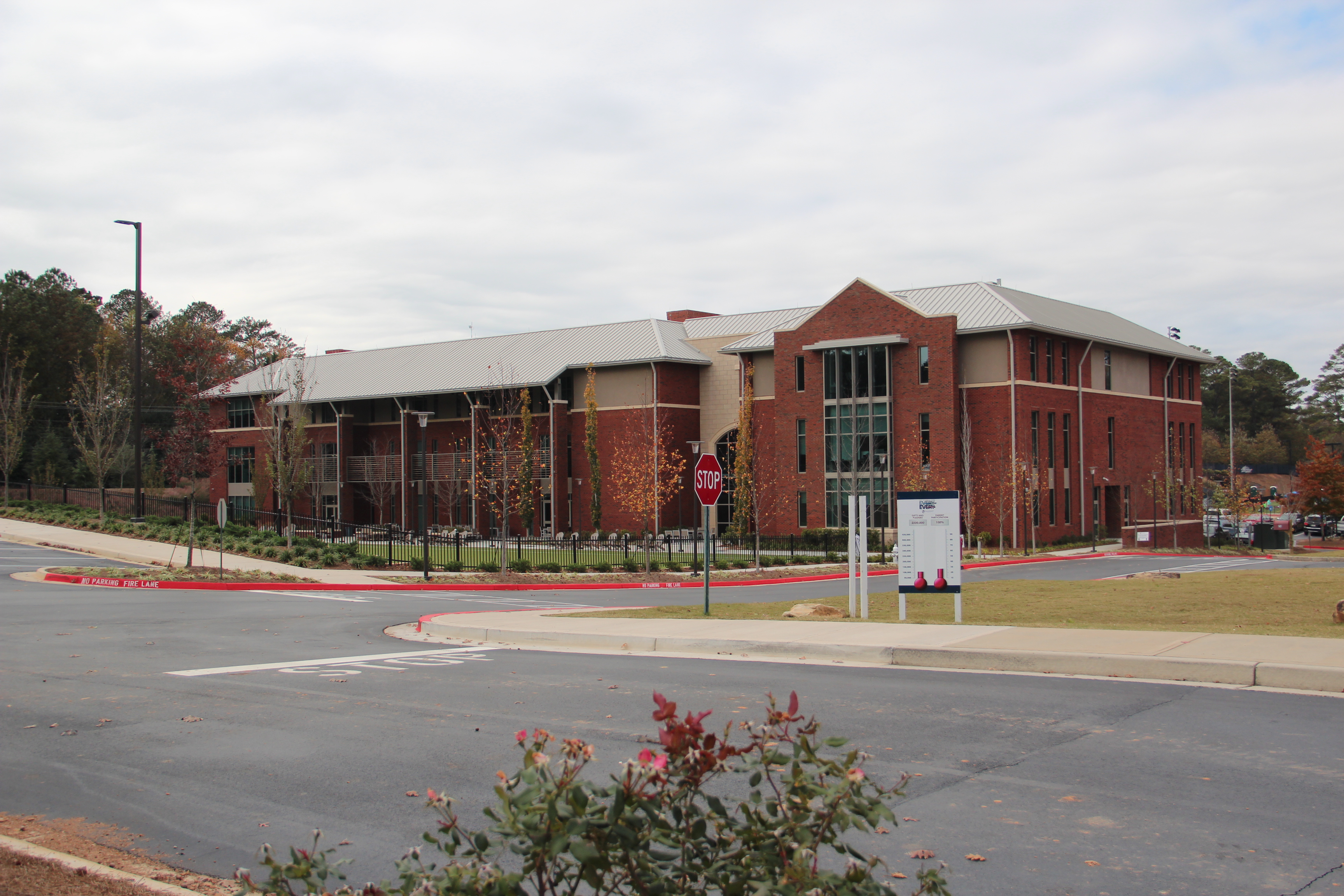

Location
- 10965 Woodstock Road; Roswell, Georgia; United States; 34°03′04″N 84°22′31″W

Information
- Type: Private Christian
- Established: 1986
- Grades: K–12
- Enrollment: 877 students
- Colors: Navy blue, maroon
- Mascot: Paladin
- Accreditation: Southern Association of Colleges and Schools, Association of Christian Schools International, and Georgia Accrediting Commission
- Website: Fellowship Christian School

Fellowship Christian School is a private Christian school in Roswell, Georgia. It is located on Woodstock Road off of Georgia State Route 92. Neighboring Fellowship Christian are Roswell High School and Blessed Trinity Catholic High School. The school's primary goals are to introduce Biblical truths and help their students in whole-person development. As of the end of the 2014 school year, Fellowship Christian had more than 800 students. It is accredited by the Southern Association of Colleges and Schools, the Association of Christian Schools International), the Evangelical Council for Financial Accountability, and the Southern Association of Independent Schools.

== History ==
Fellowship Christian School was founded in 1986. Initially, it was an elementary and middle school. In 1993 it began offering a high school education. In 2007 the kindergarten program was expanded.

== STEM ==
Fellowship Christian School offers a STEM program focused on hands-on design activities in engineering and computer technologies.

== Athletics ==
Fellowship Christian Paladins participate in athletics at all levels, but the high school teams compete in the Georgia High School Association (GHSA). The GHSA has Fellowship Christian School in Class A, Region 7, Division A.
