= Mountain Park, Fulton County, Georgia =

Mountain Park, Georgia
- City
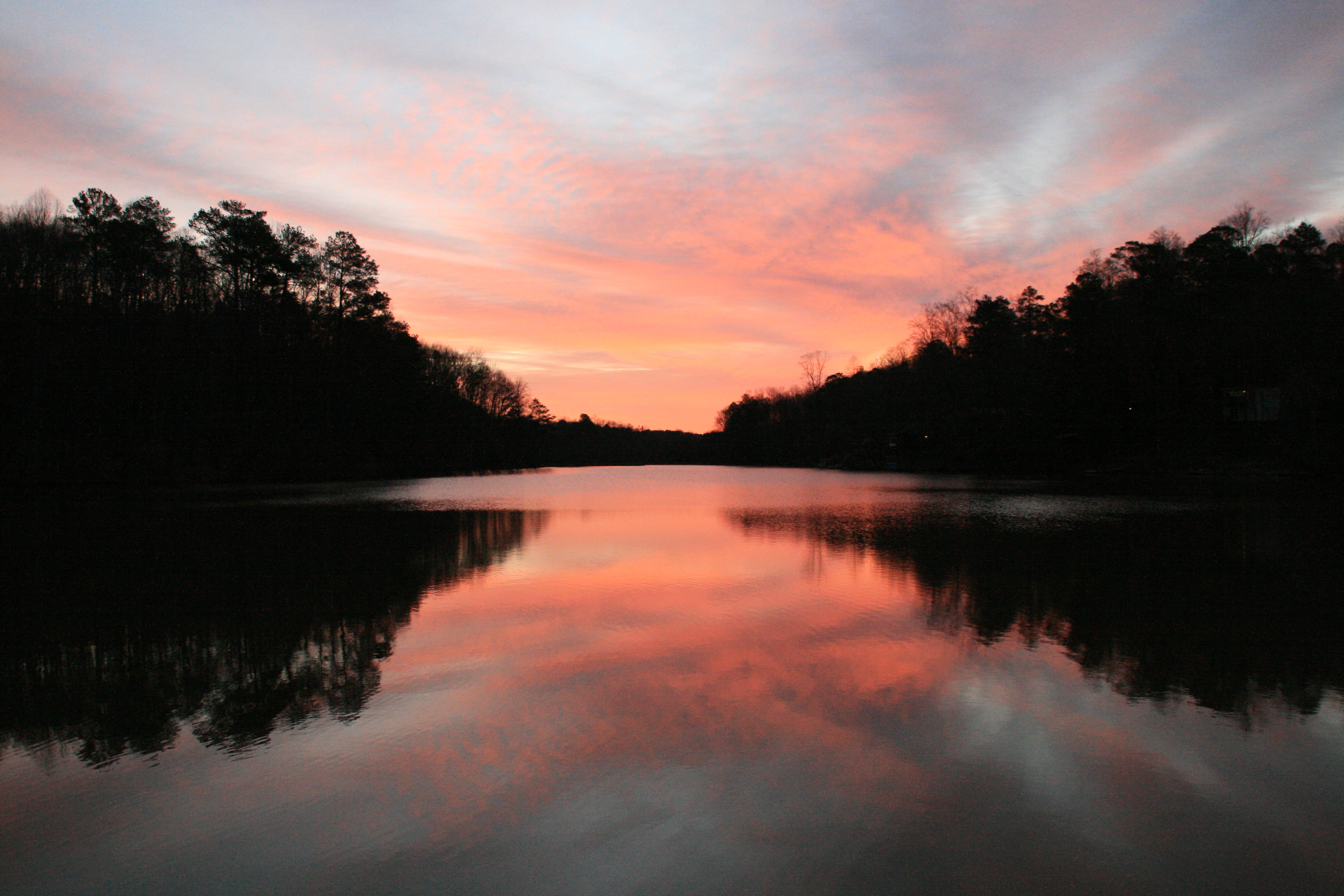
- Sunrise over Lake Garrett in Mountain Park

- Logo

- Location in Fulton County and the state of Georgia
- Coordinates: 34°04′59″N 84°24′48″W
- Country: United States
- State: Georgia
- County: Fulton, Cherokee
- Incorporated: 1927

Area
  - Total: 0.53 sq mi (1.37 km^{2})
  - Land: 0.46 sq mi (1.20 km^{2})
  - Water: 0.069 sq mi (0.18 km^{2})
- Elevation: 1,004 ft (306 m)

Population (2020)
  - Total: 583
  - Density: 1,262.9/sq mi (487.62/km^{2})
- Time zone: UTC-5 (EST)
  - Summer (DST): UTC-4 (EDT)
- FIPS code: 13-53172
- GNIS feature ID: 2404331
- Website: mountainparkgov.com

Mountain Park is a city primarily in the western part of northern Fulton County in the U.S. state of Georgia, with a small portion extending less than 1,000 feet (300 m) into southeastern Cherokee County. As of the 2020 U.S. census, the city had a total population of 583.

Incorporated in 1927, it is designated a wildlife refuge. There is no zoning for commercial or business uses, only residential. As of June 23, 2025 it is the municipality in the county with the smallest population.

Law enforcement is provided by the Roswell Police Department on a contract basis.

== History ==
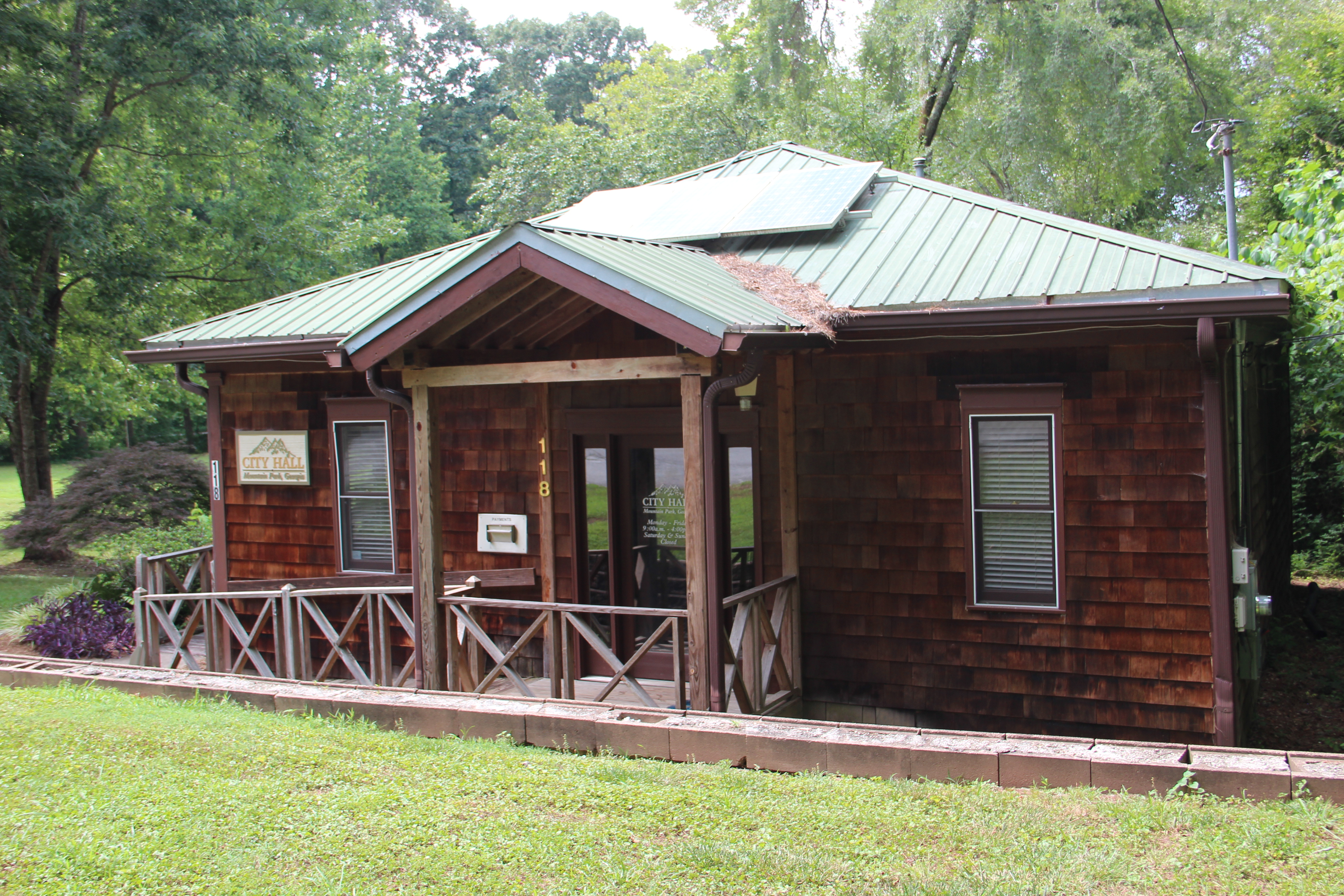
Mountain Park city hall

Mountain Park was incorporated in 1927. When it was incorporated, it did not have any people designated as residents. Circa 1945, the community had 241 people registered as voters who originated from different places in the United States, while 12 people lived in the community full time.

By 2021 there was a movement for Mountain Park to disincorporate so it could be merged into a larger city.

== Geography ==
According to the United States Census Bureau, the city has a total area of 0.5 square miles (1.3 km^{2}), of which 0.1 square miles (0.26 km^{2}), or 12.96%, is water.

Mountain Park is bordered on three sides by Roswell, and on the west by an unincorporated area of Cherokee County; although the city extends into Cherokee County, the large majority of the city is located in Fulton County.

Lake Garrett is within the city, and downstream to the northwest Lake Cherful straddles the county line. Both lakes are gradually being destroyed by siltation, caused by development upstream in Roswell. The city sued in 2005. The developers contested their liability and claim the lakes have likely out-lived their "life expectancy", and the situation is likely caused by the natural flow of silt and sediment in the basin. Due to numerous pre-trial motions, the case did not go to court until October 2010, when the jury ruled in favor of Mountain Park but only awarded $45,000 in damages.

== Demographics ==
Historical population
Census	Pop.	Note	%±
1940	10		—
1950	15		50.0%
1960	62		313.3%
1970	268		332.3%
1980	378		41.0%
1990	554		46.6%
2000	506		−8.7%
2010	547		8.1%
2020	583		6.6%
U.S. Decennial Census; 1850-1870 1870-1880; 1890-1910 1920-1930; 1940 1950 1960; 1970 1980 1990; 2000 2010

=== 2020 census ===
Mountain Park city, Georgia – Racial and ethnic composition Note: the US Census treats Hispanic/Latino as an ethnic category. This table excludes Latinos from the racial categories and assigns them to a separate category. Hispanics/Latinos may be of any race.
Race / Ethnicity (NH = Non-Hispanic)	Pop 2000	Pop 2010	Pop 2020	% 2000	% 2010	% 2020
White alone (NH)	476	518	475	94.07%	94.70%	81.48%
Black or African American alone (NH)	8	4	10	1.58%	0.73%	1.72%
Native American or Alaska Native alone (NH)	2	2	2	0.40%	0.37%	0.34%
Asian alone (NH)	2	2	14	0.40%	0.37%	2.40%
Native Hawaiian or Pacific Islander alone (NH)	0	0	0	0.00%	0.00%	0.00%
Other race alone (NH)	1	0	2	0.20%	0.00%	0.34%
Mixed race or Multiracial (NH)	10	4	47	1.98%	0.73%	8.06%
Hispanic or Latino (any race)	7	17	33	1.38%	3.11%	5.66%
Total	506	547	583	100.00%	100.00%	100.00%

As of the 2020 United States census, there were 583 people, 273 households, and 171 families residing in the city.

Circa 2024, 526 people lived in Fulton County and 21 people lived in Cherokee County.

In 2000, the median income for a household in the city was $55,875, and the median income for a family was $61,875. Males had a median income of $42,500 versus $35,769 for females. The per capita income for the city was $31,085. About 2.6% of families and 3.8% of the population were below the poverty line, including 3.0% of those under age 18 and 4.2% of those age 65 or over.

== Government and infrastructure ==
Beginning in 1998, the city contracted police and emergency medical services from Roswell. In 2021, it also began contracting fire department services, instead of relying on a volunteer fire department, as well as Roswell's 9-1-1 hotline.

== Education ==
The Fulton County portion (that is, the vast majority of the city) is in the Fulton County School System school district. The zoned elementary school is Mountain Park Elementary School in Roswell. That school feeds into Crapabble Middle School and Roswell High School.

Areas in Cherokee County are in the Cherokee County School District. Residents of that portion are zoned to Arnold Mill Elementary School, Mill Creek Middle School, and River Ridge High School.
