= Teaching Museum North =

Coordinates: 34.0197°N 84.3629°W

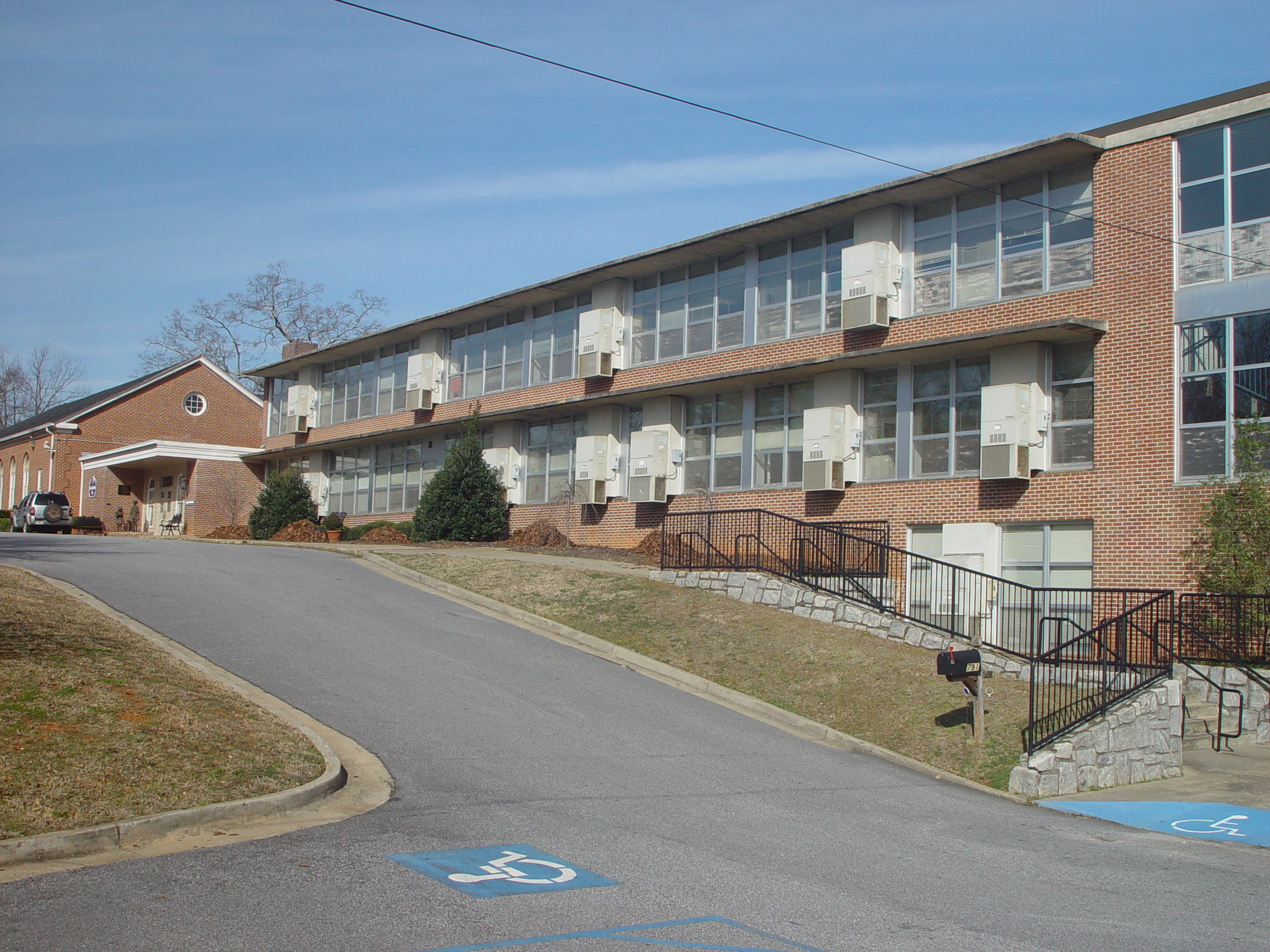
Entrance to the Teaching Museum North facility

The Teaching Museum North is located in Roswell, Georgia, USA. The museum offers participatory educational programs and exhibits for primary and secondary school children in the Fulton County School System as well as students from other schools.

== History ==
The Fulton County Public Schools Foundation, Inc. established two teaching museums in the spring of 1991. Teaching Museum North is located in the former Roswell Elementary site on Mimosa Boulevard. Teaching Museum South, located at North Avenue Elementary in Hapeville, is the South Fulton County site.
