= Odyssey of the Mind =

Creative problem-solving program for students

- Founded: 1978
- Founder: C. Samuel Micklus; Theodore Gourley
- Type: Creative problem-solving competition
- Purpose: Creativity and Problem Solving
- Origins: Glassboro State College, New Jersey
- Region served: USA and 24+ other countries
- Key people: "Dr. Sam" (C. Samuel Micklus)
- Website: https://www.odysseyofthemind.com

Odyssey of the Mind, often abbreviated as OM or OotM, is a creative problem-solving program where team members present their solution at a competition to a predefined long-term problem that takes many months to complete and involves writing, design, construction, and theatrical performance. A spontaneous portion of the competition has the team also generate solutions to a problem they have not seen before.

The program is now international, with teams from Argentina, Australia, Belarus, Canada, China, Czech Republic, DODDS, Germany, Greece, Hong Kong, Hungary, India, Indonesia, Japan, Kazakhstan, Lithuania, Mexico, Moldova, Poland, Romania, Russia, Singapore, Slovakia, South Korea, Switzerland, Togo, the United Kingdom, and Uzbekistan, regularly competing in addition to teams from the United States.

Odyssey of the Mind is a trademark of Creative Competitions. Competitions are administered by a mixture of regional non-profit associations and the for-profit Creative Competitions corporation.

== History ==
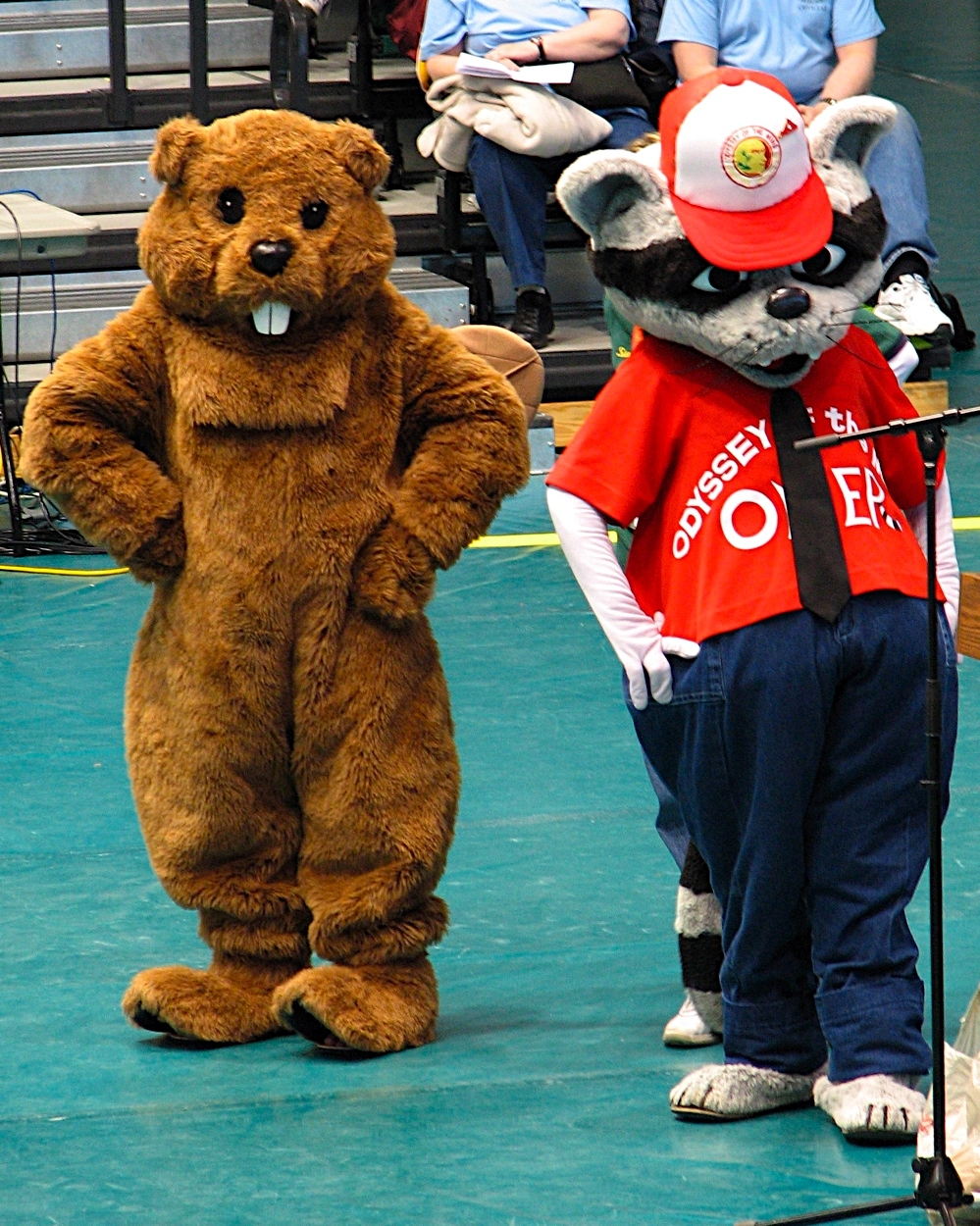
OMER the raccoon (right) is the mascot of Odyssey. SNYPS (left) is the New York state mascot.

== Organization ==
Odyssey of the Mind teams are divided into four divisions.

- Division I – Grades 3–5 (U.S.): Less than 12 years of age on May 1 of the competition year (Other International)
- Division II – Grades 6–8 (U.S.): Less than 15 years of age on May 1 of the competition year (Other International)
- Division III – Grades 9–12 (U.S.): Oldest team member does not qualify for Divisions I or II and is attending regular school (not a college, university, or anything similar) (Other International)
- Division IV – Collegiate for all teams. All team members must have a high school diploma or its equivalent and be enrolled in at least one course at a two- or four-year college or university.

The oldest team member determines the team's division.

There is also a non-competitive primary division for young children (grades K–2 U.S.), who are given a simplified problem and fewer constraints than the higher divisions. They present and are given feedback at the first level tournament and cannot advance, except for special occasions where officials invite a team to perform again at the state level.

In the United States, each participating state has its own Odyssey association. Most states are further broken down into regions. Teams compete at the regional level first. The highest-scoring teams progress to the state level. In the U.S. there is no national level. State-winning teams go directly to the World Finals, which have always been held in the United States, usually at the end of May.

== Event structure ==
There are five categories of problems that participants can solve.

- Vehicle: building vehicles of different sizes to perform specified tasks
- Technical: building "innovative contraptions"
- Classics: incorporates knowledge of architecture, art, and literature; can be a documentary or behind-the-scenes feature
- Structure: designing and building a structure using only balsa wood and glue to support the highest weight load
- Performance: acting, singing, and/or dancing based on a given theme

== World Finals ==
All teams who advance from their state finals, or their national finals if they are from outside of the US, are invited to World Finals. World Finals is the culmination of the entire year of Odyssey of the Mind. The dates and locations of previous world finals are listed in the table below.

Year	School	Location	Dates	# teams	# US States	# International countries
2026	Iowa State University	Ames, Iowa	May 27–30	TBD	TBD	TBD
2025	Michigan State University	East Lansing, Michigan	May 21–25	704	TBD	TBD
2024	Iowa State University	Ames, Iowa	May 21–24	674	32	10
2023	Michigan State University	East Lansing, Michigan	May 24–27	600+	31	10
2022	Iowa State University	Ames, Iowa	May 25–28			
2021	Orange County Convention Center	Orlando, Florida	June 11–13			
2020	Held virtually due to the COVID-19 pandemic			830+	27	14
2019	Michigan State University	East Lansing, Michigan	May 22–25	894		14
2018	Iowa State University	Ames, Iowa	May 23–26	832		13
2017	Michigan State University	East Lansing, Michigan	May 24–27	833		15
2016	Iowa State University	Ames, Iowa	May 25–28	828		13
2015	Michigan State University	East Lansing, Michigan	May 20–23	847		16
2014	Iowa State University	Ames, Iowa	May 28–31	836		15
2013	Michigan State University	East Lansing, Michigan	May 22–25	826		12
2012	Iowa State University	Ames, Iowa	May 23–26	800+		7+
2011	University of Maryland, College Park	College Park, Maryland	May 27–30	856		9+
2010	Michigan State University	East Lansing, Michigan	May 26–29	750+		6+
2009	Iowa State University	Ames, Iowa	May 27–30	787	34	13
2008	University of Maryland, College Park	College Park, Maryland	May 31 – June 3			
2007	Michigan State University	East Lansing, Michigan	May 23–26	810	31	12
2006	Iowa State University	Ames, Iowa	May 24–27	787		13
2005	University of Colorado at Boulder	Boulder, Colorado	May 21–24	763	33	16
2004	University of Maryland, College Park	College Park, Maryland	May 29 – June 1	765	34	14
2003	Iowa State University	Ames, Iowa	May 28–31	645	31	6
2002	University of Colorado at Boulder	Boulder, Colorado	May 22–25	687	35	13
2001	University of Maryland, College Park	College Park, Maryland	June 2–5	677	33	15
2000	University of Tennessee	Knoxville, Tennessee	May 31 – June 3	550+	42	11
1999	University of Tennessee	Knoxville, Tennessee	May 26–29			
1998	Disney's Wide World of Sports Complex	Lake Buena Vista, FL	May 27–30			
1997	University of Maryland, College Park	College Park, Maryland	June 4–7	730		17
1996	Iowa State University	Ames, Iowa	May 1 – June 1	727		15
1995	University of Tennessee	Knoxville, Tennessee	May 24–27	724		15
1994	Iowa State University	Ames, Iowa	June 1–4	710		14
1993	University of Maryland, College Park	College Park, Maryland	June 2–5	706		18
1992	University of Colorado at Boulder	Boulder, Colorado	May 28–30			15
1991	University of Tennessee	Knoxville, Tennessee	May 23–25	648		10
1990	Iowa State University	Ames, Iowa	May 31 – June 2			
1989	University of Colorado at Boulder	Boulder, Colorado	May 25–27			
1988	University of Maryland, College Park	College Park, Maryland	June 2–4	602		
1987	Central Michigan University	Mt Pleasant, Michigan	May 28–30	602	45	2
1986	Northern Arizona University	Flagstaff, Arizona	May 28–30			
1985	University of Maryland, College Park	College Park, Maryland	June 5–7			
1984	University of Akron	Akron, Ohio	May 30 – June 1	416		
1983	Central Michigan University	Mt Pleasant, Michigan	May 26–27			
1982	Glassboro State College	Glassboro, New Jersey	May 27–28			1
1981	Glassboro State College	Glassboro, New Jersey	June 4–5			0
