= Crestwood High School (Georgia) =

Coordinates: 33.99°N 84.33°W

- Dunwoody, Georgia; United States

Information
- Type: High school
- Established: 1972

Crestwood High School, on Colonel Drive (Dunwoody, Georgia, United States) in what is now known as Sandy Springs, opened in the Fall of 1972 to relieve overcrowding at nearby Roswell High School and North Springs High School.

Initially, Crestwood gained reputation as a public funded 'private High School,' a sales pitch used to draw a higher tax base to the area. For the first few years, the faculty and student body of the school remained almost entirely white. Students came from affluent new subdivisions such as Martin's Landing and Huntcliff. With under 1,000 students, Crestwood was designated a Georgia 'B' Class school and competed in the same class as private institutions such as Greater Atlanta Christian School and Pace Academy.

By early eighties however, Crestwood became more integrated in both teachers and students.

When the school opened it offered classes for grades 8 through 10. Grade 11 was added the following school year, and grade 12 the next year. The school then housed grades 8 through 12 until the Fulton County School System implemented the middle school system in 1983 (thereby dropping 8th grade).

In 1975 Crestwood graduated its first class of seniors, which included Peter Buck who would become lead guitarist and composer for the Athens GA-based rock band, R.E.M. Its first graduate to receive a diploma at commencement ceremonies was Scott N. Madigan.

The school's mascot was the 'Colonels,' and borrowed its logo from Ole Miss' Rebel-Colonels. The school colors were blue, red and grey and it wasn't uncommon to see "Colonel Power" bumper stickers featuring the "Colonel" mascot in the Sandy Springs area. The school quickly became a regional powerhouse in girls and boys track and cross-country as well as wrestling. In addition, an Army JROTC program was begun in 1986 and under the direction of Maj. Robert Holt, the program won back to back JROTC National Championships in 1987 and 1988.

The school's football program, led by coach Reece Hefner, reached its pinnacle in 1989, after an undefeated season the Colonels went two games deep into the playoffs to be defeated 14–10 by Wheeler High School. The Colonels beat Wheeler during the regular season 43–0.

Crestwood High School featured a baseball field, tennis courts and an eight lane running track but never had its own football stadium, rather playing varsity home games at the old Sandy Springs Stadium.

The school's facility was sometimes referred to as the "square donut" given that the halls formed a near-perfect square around a gymnasium located in the center of the building. The school was also infamous for the mica-laden sand that surrounded the building, which students tracked inside on the rubber floors.

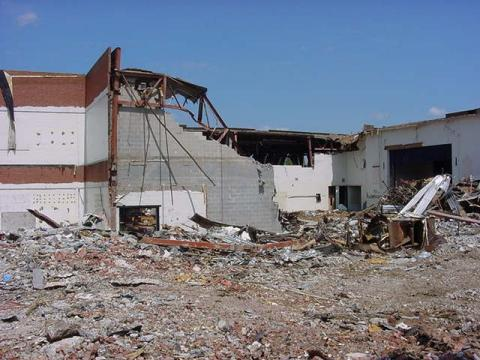
Demolition of the building in 2002

The school ceased to exist at the end of the 1990–1991 school year when the Fulton County School System restructured. Most of the students and faculty transferred to the newly opened Chattahoochee High School in Alpharetta, and Sandy Springs Middle School moved into the building in the fall of 1991.

In 2002 the building which housed Crestwood High School was demolished after a new facility was built for Sandy Springs Middle School on the same property. Before the demolition could take place significant amounts of asbestos, which could not be removed during an early 1980s asbestos removal project, had to be removed. Notable graduates include star of the long-running CBS crime drama NCIS, actress Laura 'Pauley' Perrette, Comedian David Cross, and Peter Buck of legendary alternative band R.E.M.
