= List of museums in Georgia (U.S. state) =

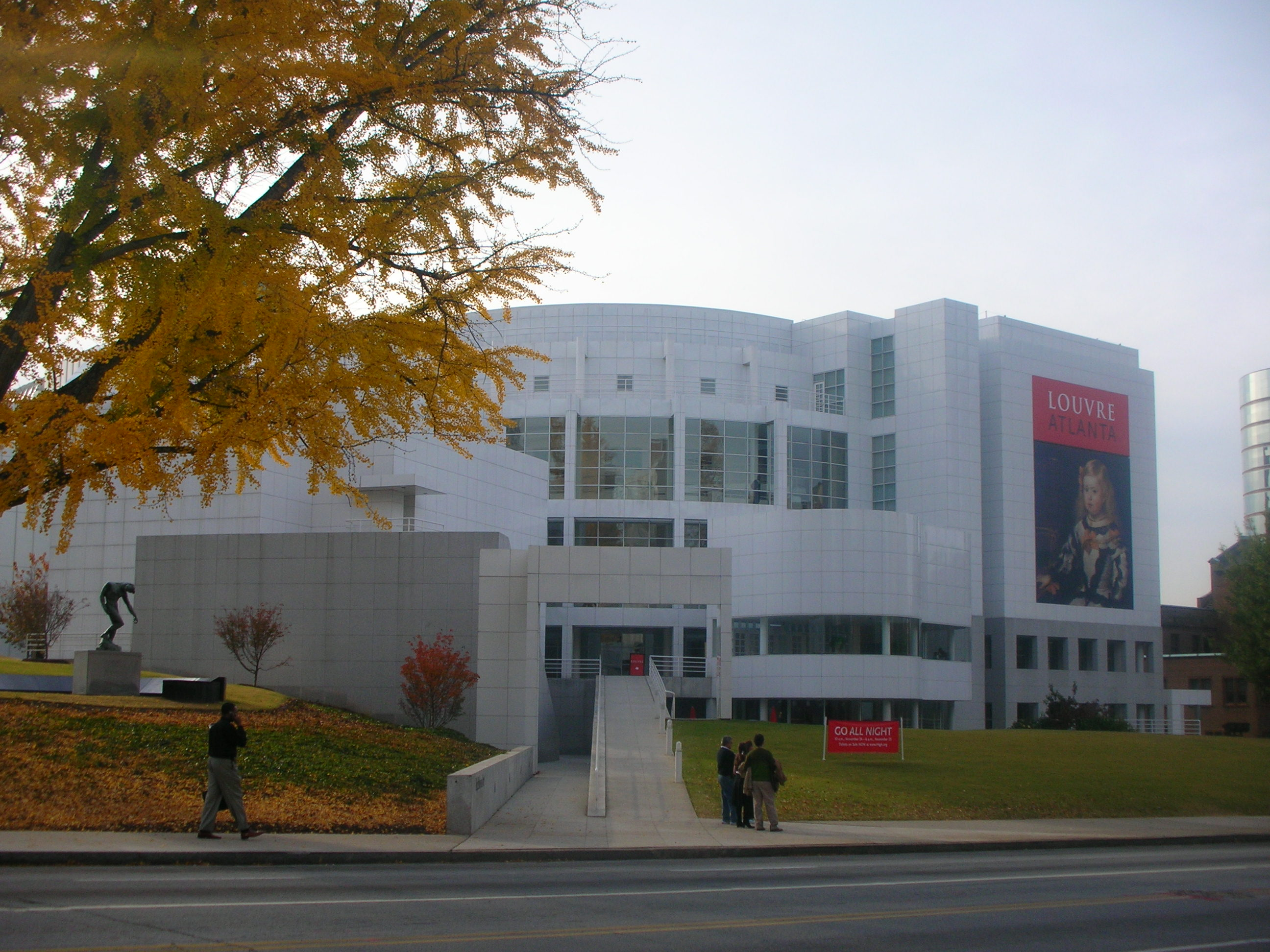
High Museum of Art in Atlanta

This list of museums in Georgia contains museums which are defined for this context as institutions (including nonprofit organizations, government entities, and private businesses) that collect and care for objects of cultural, artistic, scientific, or historical interest and make their collections or related exhibits available for public viewing. Museums that exist only in cyberspace (i.e., virtual museums) are not included.

== Museums ==
See List of museums in Atlanta for museums within the city limits of Atlanta and the immediately adjacent communities of Druid Hills and Hapeville, which are located in Fulton County.

The numbers in the "Regions" column refers to the state government's list of regions, described in a separate section below.

Name	Town/city	County	Region	Type	Notes
6th Cavalry Museum	Fort Oglethorpe	Catoosa	Northwest	Military	website
A. H. Stephens State Historic Park Confederate Museum	Crawfordville	Taliaferro	Classic South	Multiple	Includes the Victorian period Liberty Hall, and an American Civil War museum
Adairsville Depot History Museum	Adairsville	Bartow	Northwest	Railroad	information
Albany Civil Rights Institute	Albany	Dougherty	Plantation Trace	History / African American	website, history of the Albany Movement
Albany Museum of Art	Albany	Dougherty	Plantation Trace	Art	Includes African, European, and American art
Allman Brothers Band Museum	Macon	Bibb	Historic Heartland	Music	History of The Allman Brothers Band
Altama Museum of Art and History	Vidalia	Toombs	Magnolia Midlands	Art	information, collection includes Staffordshire porcelain, quadruped prints by John James Audubon, Southern art, bird prints, botanical art, wooden sculptures and a Girl Scout room
Andalusia	Milledgeville	Baldwin	Historic Heartland	Historic house	19th house of author Flannery O'Connor
Andersonville National Historic Site	Andersonville	Macon	Presidential Pathways	Military	Site of largest Confederate military prison during the American Civil War and National Prisoner of War Museum
Andrew Low House	Savannah	Chatham	Colonial Coast	Historic house	website, 19th-century period home of Girl Scouts of the USA founder Juliette Gordon Low, operated by The National Society of the Colonial Dames of America in the State of Georgia
Archibald Smith Plantation Home	Roswell	Fulton	Metro Atlanta	Historic house	19th-century plantation with two-story farm house, slave quarters, cook house, corn crib, barn, carriage house, well, and spring house
Arthur Moore Methodist Museum	St. Simons Island	Glynn	Colonial Coast	Religious	History of Methodism, artifacts of John Wesley and Charles Wesley, located at Epworth by the Sea
Ashley Slater House	Douglas	Coffee	Magnolia Midlands	Historic house	information, tourist information center and museum
Athens Institute for Contemporary Art	Athens	Clarke	Historic Heartland	Art	Hosts three exhibitions a year of contemporary art, centering on politically and socially engaged themes
Augusta Canal National Heritage Area Discovery Center	Augusta	Richmond	Classic South	Multiple	History of the canal, textile mills along the canal, mill workers, hydroelectricity, canal boat toursa
Augusta Museum of History	Augusta	Richmond	Classic South	Local history	
Autrey Mill Nature Preserve and Heritage Center	Johns Creek	Fulton	Metro Atlanta	Open air	Nature preserve, heritage village, farm museum, live animals and dioramas
Averitt Center for the Arts	Statesboro	Bulloch	Magnolia Midlands	Art	website, include exhibit galleries
Barrow County Museum	Winder	Barrow	Historic Heartland	Local history	Facebook, located inside a historic jail
Barrington Hall	Roswell	Fulton	Metro Atlanta	Historic house	19th-century period home
Bartow History Museum	Cartersville	Bartow	Northwest	Local history	Displays include settlement, Cherokee life and removal, Civil War strife, and lifestyles of years past
Beach Institute African-American Cultural Center	Savannah	Chatham	Colonial Coast	Art	website, African-American art, folk art and culture
Bedingfield Inn	Lumpkin	Stewart	Presidential Pathways	Historic site	information, mid-19th-century period inn
Bellevue	LaGrange	Troup	Presidential Pathways	Historic house	1850s Greek Revival mansion
Beulah Rucker Museum and Education Center	Gainesville	Hall	Northeast	African American	website, African-American heritage in Gainesville and north Georgia
Blackbridge Gallery	Milledgeville	Baldwin	Historic Heartland	Art	website, part of Georgia College & State University
Blue and Gray Museum	Fitzgerald	Ben Hill	Magnolia Midlands	Local history	Located in a historic railroad depot, area history during the Civil War
Booth Western Art Museum	Cartersville	Bartow	Northwest	Art	Contemporary American Western art, Civil War art, Presidential letters and portraits
Boyhood Home of President Woodrow Wilson	Augusta	Richmond	Classic South	Historic house	1860s period boyhood home of President Woodrow Wilson
Brenau University Galleries	Gainesville	Hall	Northeast	Art	website, includes three galleries in different locations
Brown House Museum	Sandersville	Washington	Northeast	Local history	website, operated by the Washington County Historical Society
Bulloch Hall	Roswell	Fulton	Metro Atlanta	Historic house	19th-century period home
Burke County Museum	Waynesboro	Burke	Classic South	Local history	information, open by appointment
Cairo Antique Auto Museum	Cairo	Grady	Plantation Trace	Automotive	information, information, antique cars, bicycles and motorbikes from the 1900 era, open the first Saturday of each month
Callaway Plantation	Washington	Wilkes	Classic South	Open air	Features several historic houses and structures
Candler Field Museum	Griffin	Spalding	Metro Atlanta	history	website, Candler Field Museum is a replica of the old Atlanta Airport as it existed in the late 1920s and early 30s.
Cannonball House	Macon	Bibb	Historic Heartland	Historic house	1853 Greek Revival house with Civil War museum, furnishings and decorative piece of the Alpha Delta Pi sorority, a recreation of the Philomathean Society room at Wesleyan College
Carnegie Center	Fitzgerald	Ben Hill	Magnolia Midlands	Art	website, changing exhibits, operated by the Fitzgerald Ben Hill Arts Council, located in a former Carnegie Library
Carter-Coile Doctors Museum	Winterville	Clarke	Historic Heartland	Medical	website, country doctor's house and office
Cedartown Museum of Coca-Cola Memorabilia	Cedartown	Polk	Northwest	Local history	website, open only Thursdays to Saturdays
Charlie Elliott Wildlife Center	Mansfield	Newton	Historic Heartlands	Natural history	Nature preserve with exhibits on wildlife and hunting
Chickamauga and Chattanooga National Military Park	Chickamauga	Walker	Historic High Country	Military	Museum and site of the Battle of Chickamauga during the American Civil War
Chief Vann House Historic Site	Chatsworth	Murray	Historic High Country	Historic house	Early 19th-century Cherokee plantation home
Chieftains Museum / Major Ridge Home	Rome	Floyd	Northwest	Historic house	19th-century home of Cherokee chief Major Ridge
Church-Waddel-Brumby House	Athens	Clarke	Historic Heartland	Historic house	website, serves as the Athens Welcome Center and 1820s house museum
Coca-Cola Space Science Center	Columbus	Muscogee	Magnolia Midlands	Aerospace	website, space science and astronomy, includes Challenger Learning Center, the Omnisphere Theater and the Mead Observatory
Colquitt County Arts Center	Moultrie	Colquitt	Plantation Trace	Art	website
Columbus Black History Museum	Columbus	Muscogee	Presidential Pathways	African American	website
Columbus Museum	Columbus	Muscogee	Presidential Pathways	Multiple	American art and regional culture and history
Congregation Mickve Israel	Savannah	Chatham	Colonial Coast	Jewish	1733 synagogue and historic artifacts
Consolidated Mine	Dahlonega	Lumpkin	Northeast	Mining	Underground tours of the former gold mine
Crawford W. Long Museum	Jefferson	Jackson	Northeast	Medical	website, life and career of Dr. Crawford Long, and his use of sulfuric ether to provide "painless surgery"
The Crescent at Valdosta Garden Center	Valdosta	Lowndes	Plantation Trace	Historic house	website
Crime & Punishment Museum	Ashburn	Turner	Plantation Trace	Prison	information, information, former Turner County Jail
Cumberland Island National Seashore Museum	St. Marys	Camden	Colonial Coast	Local history	Natural and cultural history of the island
Currahee Military Museum	Toccoa	Stephens	Northeast	Military	website, operated by the Stephens County Historical Society, history of Camp Toccoa at Currahee Mountain in WWII, located in the Toccoa (Amtrak station)
Dahlonega Gold Museum	Dahlonega	Lumpkin	Northeast	Mining	Includes artifacts and equipment from the 1836 gold rush
Dauset Trails Nature Center	Jackson	Butts	Historic Heartland	Natural history	
Davenport House Museum	Savannah	Chatham	Colonial Coast	Historic house	1820s period Isaiah Davenport House, operated by the Historic Savannah Foundation
Decatur County Museum	Bainbridge	Decatur	Plantation Trace	Local history	website, seeking new location
DeKalb History Center	Decatur	DeKalb	Metro Atlanta	Local history	website
Dorchester Academy	Midway	Liberty	Colonial Coast	African American	Work by the Southern Christian Leadership Conference's Citizen Education Program in attaining equality for blacks in the American South
Douglas County Museum of History and Art	Douglasville	Douglas	Metro Atlanta	Multiple	Local history, mid 20th-century culture, art and antiques
Drummer Boy Museum	Andersonville	Sumter	Presidential Pathways	Military	website, Civil War uniforms, history and memorabilia
Dublin-Laurens Museum	Dublin	Laurens	Magnolia Midlands	Local history	website, operated by the Laurens County Historical Society
Eagle Tavern Welcome Center & Museum	Watkinsville	Oconee	Historic Heartland	Historic house	Early 19th-century period tavern
East Point Historical Society Museum	East Point	Fulton	Colonial Coast	Local history	website
Effingham Museum	Springfield	Effingham	Colonial Coast	Local history	website, operated by the Historic Effingham Society
Elachee Nature Science Center	Gainesville	Hall	Northeast	Multiple	website, nature center with natural history and science exhibits
Elberton Granite Museum	Elberton	Elbert	Historic Heartland	Industry	Website, granite quarrying and carving
Elisha Winn House	Lawrenceville	Gwinnett	Metro Atlanta	Historic house	Operated by the Gwinnett Historical Society, early 19th-century house and outbuildings
Emery Center	Dalton	Whitfield	Northwest	African American	website
Erskine Caldwell Birthplace and Museum	Moreland	Coweta	Metro Atlanta	Biographical	1903 period home of author Erskine Caldwell, may be closed, information
Etowah Indian Mounds	Cartersville	Bartow	Northwest	Archaeological	Preserves three Mississippian culture mounds and museum with artifacts found at the site
Euharlee History Museum	Euharlee	Bartow	Northwest	Local history	website
Ezekiel Harris House	Augusta	Richmond	Classic South	Historic house	website, operated by the Augusta Museum of History, 18th-century period house
Firehouse Center and Gallery	Bainbridge	Decatur	Plantation Trace	Art	website, gallery of the Bainbridge-Decatur County Arts Council
First African Baptist Church	Savannah	Chatham	Colonial Coast	History	Tours of the historic black Baptist church and artifacts dating to the 18th century
Fitzgerald Fire Engine Museum	Fitzgerald	Ben Hill	Magnolia Midlands	Firefighting	website
Flannery O'Connor Childhood Home	Savannah	Chatham	Colonial Coast	Historic house	1920s-1930s period home of author Flannery O'Connor
Flowery Branch Historic Depot and Caboose	Flowery Branch	Hall	Northeast	Railroad	information
Folk Pottery Museum of Northeast Georgia	Sautee Nacoochee	White	Northeast	Art	website
Fort Frederica National Monument	St. Simons Island	Glynn	Colonial Coast	Military	Visitor center with archaeological artifacts and exhibits about the 18th-century fort and town
Fort Gaines Frontier Village	Fort Gaines	Clay	Plantation Trace	Open air	website
Fort Hollingsworth-White House	Alto	Banks	Northeast	Historic house	Frontier fort house and outbuildings
Fort King George Historical Site	Darien	McIntosh	Colonial Coast	Military	Reconstructed 1736 fort and museum
Fort McAllister Historic Park	Keller	Bryan	Colonial Coast	Military	Civil War earthwork fortification and museum
Fort Morris Historic Site	Midway	Liberty	Colonial Coast	Military	American Revolutionary fort site and museum
Fort Pulaski National Monument	Tybee Island	Chatham	Colonial Coast	Military	Civil War fort and museum with weekend living history demonstrations
Fort Stewart Museum	Fort Stewart	Liberty	Colonial Coast	Military	website, history of the Fort Stewart Military Reservation
Foxfire Museum & Heritage Center	Mountain City	Rabun	Northeast	Open air	website
Funk Heritage Center	Waleska	Cherokee	Northwest	Native American	Part of Reinhardt University, Native American art, artifacts and culture, and open air Appalachian Settlement
Geechee Kunda	Riceboro	Liberty	Colonial Coast	African American	website, culture of the Gullah, local and African art, textiles, tools, utensils, implements, crafts and essentials
Georgia College Museum	Milledgeville	Baldwin	Historic Heartland	Multiple	website, changing exhibits of art and history, permanent exhibit on Flannery O'Connor
Georgia College Natural History Museum	Milledgeville	Baldwin	Historic Heartland	Natural history	website, features dinosaurs, fossils, earth sciences and a planetarium
Georgia Cotton Museum	Vienna	Dooly	Presidential Pathways	Industry - cotton	information, cotton farming
Georgia Museum of Agriculture & Historic Village	Tifton	Tift	Plantation Trace	Living	Five areas: a traditional farm community of the 1870s, an 1890s progressive farmstead, an industrial sites complex, rural town, Peanut Museum, and the Georgia Museum of Agriculture Center
Georgia Museum of Art	Athens	Clarke	Historic Heartland	Art	The official state museum of art, part of the University of Georgia
Georgia Museum of Natural History	Athens	Clarke	Historic Heartland	Natural history	Part of the University of Georgia
Georgia Racing Hall of Fame Museum	Dawsonville	Dawson	Northwest	Automotive	website, stock cars, includes memorabilia and cars of Bill Elliott
Georgia Radio Museum and Hall of Fame	St. Marys	Camden	Georgia's Coast	Media	History of radio broadcasting in Georgia, plus Georgia Radio Inductee Wall of Fame
Georgia Rural Telephone Museum	Leslie	Sumter	Magnolia Midlands	Technology	Antique telephones and telephone memorabilia
Georgia Salzburger Society Museum	Rincon	Effingham	Colonial Coast	History	website, history of the descendants of the Salzburg refugees who settled in Georgia after their expulsion in 1734
Georgia Southern Museum	Statesboro	Bulloch	Magnolia Midlands	Multiple	Natural history and dinosaur exhibits, science, local history, part of Georgia Southern University
Georgia Southern University Center for Art and Theatre	Statesboro	Bulloch	Magnolia Midlands	Art	Includes three galleries, one of which is the permanent home for The Georgia Artists Collection
Georgia Sports Hall of Fame	Macon	Bibb	Historic Heartland	Sports	
Georgia State Railroad Museum	Savannah	Chatham	Colonial Coast	Railroad	Operated by the Coastal Heritage Society, historic railcars and rolling stock, operational turntable
Georgia Veterans State Park	Cordele	Crisp	Presidential Pathways	Military	
Georgia's Old Capital Museum	Milledgeville	Baldwin	Historic Heartland	Local history	Located in the building where Georgia's legislators voted to secede from the Union
Gertrude Herbert Institute of Art	Augusta	Richmond	Classic South	Art	
Gilmer Arts Gallery	Ellijay	Gilmer	Northwest	Local history	website, operated by the Gilmer Arts and Heritage Association
Girl Scout First Headquarters	Savannah	Chatham	Colonial Coast	Scouting	website, located in former carriage house of Girl Scouts of the USA founder Juliette Gordon Low
Glennville-Tattnall Museum	Glennville	Tattnall	Magnolia Midlands	Local history	website
Global Village & Discovery Center	Americus	Sumter	Presidential Pathways	Open air	website, Habitat for Humanity site with Habitat houses from countries around the world that show life in poverty
Go Fish Education Center	Perry	Houston	Historic Heartland	Multiple	website, operated by the Georgia Department of Natural Resources, Georgia's watersheds and aquatic wildlife, their natural habitats and the impacts of water pollution, fishing, boating, fish hatcheries
Gordon-Lee Mansion	Chickamauga	Walker	Northwest	Historic house	Mid-19th-century house with many historic associations
Green-Meldrim House	Savannah	Chatham	Colonial Coast	Historic house	Mid-19th-century house
Greene County Museum	Greensboro	Greene	Classic South	Local history	information, operated by the Greene County Historical Society
Griffin Museum	Griffin	Spalding	Presidential Pathways	Local history	information
Grovetown Museum	Grovetown	Columbia	Classic South	Local history	information
Gwinnett Environmental & Heritage Center	Buford	Gwinnett	Metro Atlanta	Science and history	Focus on the environment, also operates the Gwinnett History Museum in Lawrenceville and a restored 1930s farm in Duluth
Hamburg State Park	Mitchell	Washington	Classic South	Mill	Includes a working grist mill and a museum with agriculture equipment and tools
Hamilton House	Dalton	Whitfield	Northwest	Multiple	information, exhibits include chenille bedspreads, items and tufting artifacts, Civil War artifacts, antiques, open by appointment with the Whitfield-Murray Historical Society
Hamilton Plantation Slave Cabins	St. Simons Island	Glynn	Colonial Coast	Historic house	Two tabby slave cabins operated by the Cassina Garden Club, located at Gascoigne Bluff
Harris Art Center	Calhoun	Gordon	Northwest	Multiple	website, includes art galleries and the Roland Hayes Museum, about the first African-American classical singer to have an international career on the concert and operatic stages
Hazlehurst-Jeff Davis Historical Museum	Hazlehurst	Jeff Davis	Magnolia Midlands	Local history	information
Heard County Historical Center & Museum	Franklin	Heard	Presidential Pathways	Local history	Located in a former jail, operated by the Heard County Historical Society
Heritage Hall (Madison, Georgia)	Madison	Morgan	Historic Heartland	Historic house	website
Heritage Sandy Springs Museum	Sandy Springs	Fulton	Metro Atlanta	Historic house	website, includes 19th-century Williams-Payne House and outbuildings, operated by Heritage Sandy Springs
Heritage Station Museum	Douglas	Coffee	Magnolia Midlands	Local history	information
Hickory Hill	Thomson	McDuffie	Classic South	Historic house	Early 20th-century period home of Georgia Populist Party co-founder Thomas E. Watson
Hills and Dales Estate	LaGrange	Troup	Presidential Pathways	Historic house	1916 estate and gardens of Fuller Callaway, designed by Neel Reid
Historic Railroad Shops	Savannah	Chatham	Colonial Coast	Railroad	Railroad trains and street cars
Historic Seabrook Village	Midway	Liberty	Colonial Coast	Open air	Facebook site, includes over a dozen buildings representing rural coastal African American life after the Civil War
Hofwyl-Broadfield Plantation Historic Site	Brunswick	Glynn	Colonial Coast	Historic house	19th-century rice plantation slave cabins
Holliday-Dorsey-Fife House Museum	Fayetteville	Fayette	Metro Atlanta	Local history	Includes Gone With the Wind and Civil War memorabilia
Howard Finster Vision House	Summerville	Chattooga	Northwest	Art	website, house and museum of visionary artist Howard Finster, open by appointment
Hudgens Center for the Arts	Duluth	Gwinnett	Metro Atlanta	Art	website, officially the Jacqueline Casey Hudgens Center for the Arts
Hurn Museum	Savannah	Chatham	Colonial Coast	Art	Contemporary folk art
Indian Springs Hotel Museum	Indian Springs	Butts	Historic Heartland	Local history	Tours of the ante-bellum mineral springs hotel
Indian Springs State Park	Flovilla	Butts	Historic Heartland	Local history	Park features a seasonal museum with exhibits on the Creek Nation, the CCC and local history
Interactive Neighborhood for Kids	Gainesville	Hall	Northeast	Children's	website
Jack Hadley Black History Museum	Thomasville	Thomas	Plantation Trace	African American	website, black history memorabilia
James Longstreet Museum	Gainesville	Hall	James Longstreet	Confederate General	website
Janice Persons Biggers House	Columbus	Muscogee	Presidential Pathways	Historic house	website, 19th-century period home and offices of Historic Columbus, also known as 700 Broadway
Jarrell Plantation Historic Site	Juliette	Monroe	Historic Heartland	Historic house	19th-century cotton plantation farm with outbuildings
Jefferson Davis Memorial Historic Site	Irwinville	Irwin	Magnolia Midlands	History	Jefferson Davis Memorial Museum at site where Confederate President Jefferson Davis was captured in 1865
Jekyll Island Museum	Jekyll Island	Glynn	Colonial Coast	Local history	
Jimmy Carter National Historic Site	Plains	Sumter	Presidential Pathways	Biographical	Includes President Jimmy Carter's residence, boyhood farm, school, town railroad depot and a museum about his life
Johnston-Felton-Hay House	Macon	Bibb	Historic Heartland	Historic house	Also known as the Hay House, 1850s Italian Renaissance Revival style mansion with furnishings from many periods
Juliette Gordon Low Birthplace	Savannah	Chatham	Colonial Coast	Historic house	1880s Victorian period home of Girl Scouts of the USA founder Juliette Gordon Low
Kennesaw Mountain National Battlefield Park	Kennesaw	Cobb	Metro Atlanta	Military	Includes Civil War battleground of the Atlanta Campaign and a museum
King-Tisdell Cottage	Savannah	Chatham	Colonial Coast	African American	information, African-American Savannah and the Sea Islands
Kingston Woman's History Museums	Kingston	Bartow	Northwest	Local history	information
Kolomoki Mounds Historic Park	Blakely	Early	Plantation Trace	Archaeology	Museum with early Native American artifacts excavated from the park's Woodland Period mounds
L.L. Wyatt Museum	Greensboro	Greene	Classic South	Prison	information, early 19th-century prison with memorabilia from Greene County's law enforcement history
LaGrange Art Museum	LaGrange	Troup	Presidential Pathways	Art	website, formerly the Chattahoochee Valley Art Museum
Lamar Dodd Art Center	LaGrange	Troup	Presidential Pathways	Art	website, part of LaGrange College
Lamar Dodd School of Art Galleries	Athens	Clarke	Historic Heartland	Art	Contemporary art galleries
Lapham-Patterson House	Thomasville	Thomas	Plantation Trace	Historic house	1880s Victorian house
Laurel & Hardy Museum	Harlem	Columbia	Classic South	Biographical	website, Facebook site, early film comedians Stan Laurel and Oliver Hardy
Lawrenceville Female Seminary	Lawrenceville	Gwinnett	Metro Atlanta	Local history	Open by appointment, houses the Gwinnett History Museum
Legacy Museum on Main	LaGrange	Troup	Presidential Pathways	Local history	website
Lincoln County Historical Park	Lincolnton	Lincoln	Classic South	Open air	information
Little White House Historic Site	Warm Springs	Meriwether	Presidential Pathways	History	President Franklin Delano Roosevelt's personal retreat
Log Cabin At Milton High School	Alpharetta	Fulton	Colonial Coast	Historic house	website, open by appointment with the Alpharetta Historical Society
Lowndes County Historical Museum	Valdosta	Lowndes	Plantation Trace	History	website, operated by the Lowndes County Historical Society
Lucy Craft Laney Museum of Black History	Augusta	Richmond	Classic South	African American	website, promotes the legacy of Lucy Craft Laney through art, history, and the preservation of her home
Lunchbox Museum	Columbus	Muscogee	Presidential Pathways	Commodity	information, information, located inside the International Marketplace, metal lunch boxes
Lyndon House Arts Center	Athens	Clarke	Historic Heartland	Multiple	Art exhibits and 19th-century Ware-Lyndon House museum
Madison Museum of Fine Art	Madison	Morgan	Historic Heartland	Art	American, European, Asian and African art and sculpture
Madison-Morgan Cultural Center	Madison	Morgan	Historic Heartland	Multiple	website, changing exhibits of art and culture, permanent exhibits of local history, decorative arts, antiques, school room
Male Academy Museum	Newnan	Coweta	Metro Atlanta	Local history	website, operated by the Newnan-Coweta Historical Society
Mansell House and Gardens	Alpharetta	Fulton	Metro Atlanta	Historic house	website, 1912 Queen Anne-style house, operated by the Alpharetta Historical Society
Massee Lane Gardens	Fort Valley	Peach	Historic Heartland	Decorative arts	Botanical gardens with Annabelle Lundy Fetterman Educational Museum featuring a Boehm porcelain collection
Massie Heritage Center	Savannah	Chatham	Colonial Coast	Local history	website, a unit of the Savannah-Chatham County Public Schools, includes a model of old Savannah, Victorian building architecture and artifacts, the impact of Classical styles on Savannah buildings, a 19th-century period classroom, and the founding of Savannah
Marietta/Cobb Museum of Art	Marietta	Cobb	Metro Atlanta	Art	website, American art
Marietta Fire Museum	Marietta	Cobb	Metro Atlanta	Firefighting	website, antique fire apparatus, equipment, helmets, uniforms
Marietta Gone With the Wind Museum: Scarlett on the Square	Marietta	Cobb	Metro Atlanta	Media	website, includes Gone with the Wind movie memorabilia
Marietta Museum of History	Marietta	Cobb	Metro Atlanta	Local history	City and county history, located in Kennesaw House
Maritime Center at Historic Coast Guard Station	St. Simons Island	Glynn	Colonial Coast	Maritime	Maritime and natural history, operated by the Coastal Georgia Historical Society
Marsh House	LaFayette	Walker	Northwest	Historic house	Antebellum period house
Meadow Garden	Augusta	Richmond	Classic South	Historic house	18th-century period home of George Walton, one of the three signers of the Declaration of Independence from Georgia
Memory Lane Classic Cars	Eatonton	Putnam	Lake Oconee	Car museum	, over 150 classic automobiles and motorcycles
Mercer-Williams House Museum	Savannah	Chatham	Colonial Coast	Historic house	Includes 18th- and 19th-century furnishings and decorative arts
McRitchie-Hollis Museum	Newnan	Coweta	Metro Atlanta	Local history	website, operated by the Newnan-Coweta Historical Society, 1937 period home with exhibits about life in WWII and local history
Midway Museum	Midway	Liberty	Colonial Coast	Local history	website, Colonial era history
Mildred Huie Museum	St. Simons Island	Glynn	Colonial Coast	Art	website, information, art and history of St. Simons Island plantations and landmarks
Miles Through Time Automotive Museum	Toccoa	Stephens	Lake Hartwell	Automotive museum	, co-op style automotive museum in a restored 1939 dealership.
Mitchell Depot Historical Museum	Mitchell	Glascock	Classic South	Railroad	former railroad depot
Monroe Museum	Monroe	Walton	Historic Heartland	Local history	website, details a timeline of Monroe
Montgomery County Historic Village	Mount Vernon	Montgomery	Magnolia Midlands	Historic houses	website, part of Brewton–Parker Christian University, two 19th-century period log houses, open by appointment
Moreland Hometown Heritage Museum	Moreland	Coweta	Metro Atlanta	Local history	Also known as Old Mill Museum, information, information
Morgan County African-American Museum	Madison	Morgan	Historic Heartland	Ethnic - African American	website, history and the art of African-American culture
Morris Museum of Art	Augusta	Richmond	Classic South	Art	Art and artists of the American South
Museum of Arts and Sciences	Macon	Bibb	Historic Heartland	Multiple	Art, science, natural history, live animals, trails, a planetarium
Museum of Aviation	Warner Robins	Houston	Historic Heartland	Aviation	Located at Robins Air Force Base
Museum of Colquitt County History	Moultrie	Colquitt	Plantation Trace	Local history	website
Museum of History & Holocaust Education	Kennesaw	Cobb	Metro Atlanta	History	website, a free museum at Kennesaw State University dedicated to World War II and the Holocaust, with frequent public programs and events open to the public
Museum of Southeastern Indians	Roberta	Crawford	Historic Heartland	Native American	information, information
Museum of Southern Culture	Colquitt	Miller	Plantation Trace	Culture	Historic exhibits and memorabilia, housed in Cotton Hall, home of Swamp Gravy, the official folk life play of Georgia
Museum of Southern Isolation	Hahira	Lowndes	Plantation Trace	Oddities	ICOM-accredited private collection of vintage transportation and natural history curiosities, including a library
National Civil War Naval Museum	Columbus	Muscogee	Presidential Pathways	Military	History of the Union and Confederate navies during the Civil War
National Infantry Museum	Columbus	Muscogee	Presidential Pathways	Military	Located at Fort Benning, story of infantrymen
National Museum of Commercial Aviation	Forest Park	Clayton	Metro Atlanta	Aviation	Displays include photos, timetables, ticket jackets, uniforms, model airplanes, aviation toys, in-flight serving ware, posters, aircraft components
National Museum of the Mighty Eighth Air Force	Pooler	Chatham	Colonial Coast	Aviation	History of the Eighth Air Force and historic aircraft
Neel House Federated Garden Clubs of Macon	Macon	Bibb	Historic Heartland	Historic house	website
New Echota Historic Site	Calhoun	Gordon	Northwest	Native American	Replica 19th-century Cherokee village
Noble Hill-Wheeler Memorial Center	Cassville	Bartow	Northwest	African American	information, historic black school
Northeast Georgia History Center	Gainesville	Hall	Northeast	Local history	website, part of Brenau University, regional history and culture
Oak Hill & Martha Berry Museum	Rome	Floyd	Northwest	Multiple	Historic house and history museum about Berry College and founder Martha Berry
Obediah's Okefenok	Waycross	Ware	Colonial Coast	Open air	website, park includes 1870s log cabin, many historic farm outbuildings, agriculture equipment, animals, print shop museum, antiques, Native American exhibit
Ocmulgee National Monument	Macon	Bibb	Historic Heartland	Native American	Archaeology artifacts and Mississippian culture mound
Oglethorpe University Museum of Art	Brookhaven	DeKalb	Metro Atlanta	Art	Website, artwork which is international, representational, figurative, and spiritual in nature, located on the top floor of the Philip Weltner Library
Okefenokee Heritage Center	Waycross	Ware	Colonial Coast	Multiple	website, art and local history
Old Campbell County Historical Society Museum	Fairburn	Fulton	Metro Atlanta	Local history	website
Old Fort Jackson	Savannah	Chatham	Colonial Coast	Military	Operated by the Coastal Heritage Society, restored 19th-century brick fort
Old Governor's Mansion	Milledgeville	Baldwin	Historic Heartland	Historic house	Operated by Georgia College & State University, antebellum mansion
Old Jail Museum	Barnesville	Lamar	Historic Heartland	Local history	website, operated by the Barnesville-Lamar County Historical Society
Old Jail Museum & Genealogy Research Center	Sandersville	Washington	Northeast	Prison	website, operated by the Washington County Historical Society
Old Pickens County Jail	Jasper	Pickens	Northwest	Prison	website, 20th-century jail and sheriff's house, operated by the Marble Valley Historical Society, and the adjacent Kirby-Quinton Mountain Heritage Cabin
Old South Farm Museum	Woodland	Talbot	Presidential Pathways	Agriculture	website, farm tools, equipment and home life implements
Old Stone Church Museum	Ringgold	Catoosa	Northwest	Local history	Facebook site, information
Paradise Garden	Summerville	Chattooga	Northwest	Art	website, sculpture park museum created by visionary artist Howard Finster
Pasaquan	Buena Vista	Marion	Presidential Pathways	Art	Visionary art site
Paulding County History Museum	Dallas	Paulding	Northwest	Local history	website, operated by the Paulding County Historical Society
Pebble Hill Plantation	Thomasville	Thomas	Plantation Trace	Historic house	20th-century estate featuring 19th-century furniture, porcelain, silver, crystal, and glassware, sporting art and 33 Audubon lithographs, extensive grounds and gardens
Pemberton House	Columbus	Muscogee	Presidential Pathways	Historic house	Operated by Historic Columbus, Victorian cottage with a late 19th-century apothecary shop, Coca-Cola mementos
Perry Area Historical Museum	Perry	Houston	Historic Heartland	Local history	website, operated by the Perry Area Historical Society
Pickens County Marble Museum	Nelson	Pickens	Northwest	Industry	information, located in City Hall, history of area marble mining
Pickett's Mill Battlefield Historic Site	Dallas	Paulding	Northwest	Military	Civil War battlefield and museum
Pin Point Heritage Museum	Pin Point	Chatham	Colonial Coast	Local history	website, operated by the Coastal Heritage Society, life, work and history of the Gullah/Geechee community
Pine Mountain Gold Museum	Villa Rica	Douglas	Presidential Pathways	Mining	website, former gold mine, artifacts and equipment
Polk County Historical Society Museum	Cedartown	Polk	Northwest	Local history	website
Power of the Past Museum	Thomasville	Thomas	Plantation Trace	Aviation	website, antique airplanes, motors and memorabilia, located at the Thomasville Regional Airport
Quinlan Visual Arts Center	Gainesville	Hall	Northeast	Art	website
Ralph Mark Gilbert Civil Rights Museum	Savannah	Chatham	Colonial Coast	History	Facebook site, information, history of the civil rights struggle of Georgia's oldest African-American community from slavery to the present
Rankin House	Columbus	Muscogee	Presidential Pathways	Historic house	Operated by Historic Columbus, 1850-1870 house museum
Richmond Hill Museum	Richmond Hill	Bryan	Colonial Coast	Local history	website, operated by the Richmond Hill Historical Society
Road to Tara Museum	Jonesboro	Clayton	Metro Atlanta	Media	website, items from 1939 movie Gone With The Wind and 1936 novel along with artifacts from the Civil War
Robert Toombs House Historic Site	Washington	Wilkes	Classic South	Historic house	19th-century period home of politician Robert Toombs
Rome Area History Museum	Rome	Floyd	Northwest	Local history	website
Rose Lawn Museum	Cartersville	Bartow	Northwest	Historic house	website, Victorian period mansion, houses the writings and memorabilia of evangelist Samuel Porter Jones and Rebecca Latimer Felton, the first woman to serve in the United States Senate
Roswell Fire Museum	Roswell	Fulton	Metro Atlanta	Firefighting	website
Sam Nunn Museum	Perry	Houston	Historic Heartland	Biographical	information, information, exhibits about Senator Sam Nunn in the Houston County Board of Education building
Sapelo Island Visitors Center	Darien	McIntosh	Colonial Coast	Multiple	Island's cultural and natural history
Sautee-Nacoochee History Museum	Sautee-Nacoochee	White	Northeast	Local history	website, operated by the Sautee Nacoochee Center
Savannah Children's Museum	Savannah	Chatham	Colonial Coast	Children's	website, operated by the Coastal Heritage Society, outdoor play experiences about Coastal Georgia
Savannah History Museum	Savannah	Chatham	Colonial Coast	Local history	Operated by the Coastal Heritage Society
Savannah-Ogeechee Canal Museum & Nature Center	Savannah	Chatham	Colonial Coast	Multiple	Canal history, area history and natural history
SCAD Museum of Art	Savannah	Chatham	Colonial Coast	Art	Operated by the Savannah College of Art and Design, located in the Central of Georgia Railroad: Savannah Shops and Terminal Facilities, British and American art, African American collection, decorative arts and fashion
Savoy Automobile Museum	Cartersville	Bartow	Northwest	Automobiles	website, operated by the Georgia Museums, Inc that also operates Booth Western and Tellus museums
Scull Shoals	Greensboro	Greene	Classic South	Local history	
Senoia Area Historical Society Museum	Senoia	Coweta	Metro Atlanta	Local history	website
Shelnutt House Museum	Bowdon	Carroll	Historic High Country	Historic house	information, operated by the Bowdon Area Historical Society, open on special occasions
Ships of the Sea Maritime Museum	Savannah	Chatham	Colonial Coast	Maritime	Ship models, maritime paintings and artifacts that reflect Savannah's maritime heritage
Sidney Lanier Cottage House Museum	Macon	Bibb	Historic Heartland	Historic house	Mid-19th-century period home, birthplace of poet Sidney Lanier
Smyrna Museum	Smyrna	Cobb	Metro Atlanta	Local history	website
Sorrel Weed House	Savannah	Chatham	Colonial Coast	Historic house	1830s period house
Southeastern Quilt & Textile Museum	Carrollton	Carroll	Northwest	Textile	History of quilts and textiles
Southeastern Railway Museum	Duluth	Gwinnett	Metro Atlanta	Railroad	Georgia's official transportation history museum, over 90 pieces of rolling stock exhibited on the 30-acre (12 ha) site
Southern Forest World	Waycross	Ware	Colonial Coast	Industry	website, forest industry in the South
Southern Museum of Civil War and Locomotive History	Kennesaw	Cobb	Metro Atlanta	Multiple	Railroad and Civil War artifacts, formerly the Kennesaw Civil War Museum
St. Marys Submarine Museum	St. Marys	Camden	Colonial Coast	Maritime	information, American submarine history
St. Simons Island Light	St. Simons Island	Glynn	Colonial Coast	Maritime	Lighthouse, St. Simons Lighthouse Museum in the keeper's house, adjacent A. W. Jones Heritage Center, operated by the Coastal Georgia Historical Society
Stately Oaks	Jonesboro	Clayton	Metro Atlanta	Historic house	1839 antebellum mansion and outbuildings
Steffen Thomas Museum of Art	Buckhead	Morgan	Historic Heartland	Art	Artworks and life of German-American Expressionist Steffen Thomas
Stephens County History Museum	Toccoa	Stephens	Northeast	Local history	website, operated by the Stephens County Historical Society in the Toccoa (Amtrak station)
Stone Mountain	Stone Mountain	DeKalb	Metro Atlanta	Multiple	Includes the Stone Mountain Museum about the mountain's carving and the Civil War, and the open air Antebellum Plantation and Farmyard
Suttons Corner Frontier Country Store Museum	Fort Gaines	Clay	Plantation Trace	History	website, 1840s frontier general store complex, owned by Clay County and operated by Fort Gaines Historical Society
T.R.R. Cobb House	Athens	Clarke	Historic Heartland	Historic house	Mid-19th-century period home of Confederate General Thomas Reade Rootes Cobb
Tabor House History Museum	Ellijay	Gilmer	Northwest	Local history	website, operated by the Gilmer County Historical Society
Taylor-Grady House	Athens	Clarke	Historic Heartland	Historic house	mid-19th-century mansion open for tours and rental
Teaching Museum North	Roswell	Fulton	Metro Atlanta	Multiple	Open for school groups only
Telfair Museum of Art	Savannah	Chatham	Colonial Coast	Art	Includes fine art and decorative art collections in three facilities, including the historic Telfair Mansion and Owens-Thomas House, and the contemporary Jepson Center for the Arts
Tellus Science Museum	Cartersville	Bartow	Historic High Country	Natural history/science	Formerly Weinman Mineral Museum, exhibits include minerals, dinosaurs and fossils, transportation technology, science playground and a planetarium
Thomas County Museum of History	Thomasville	Thomas	Plantation Trace	Multiple	website, includes main museum of local history, 1877 middle-class home, 1893 single-lane bowling alley, 1860s log house, 1890s courthouse
Thomasville Center for the Arts	Thomasville	Thomas	Plantation Trace	Art	website, community arts center for visual, performing, literary and applied arts, includes three galleries
Thronateeska Heritage Center	Albany	Dougherty	Plantation Trace	Multiple	Includes a science museum, local history museum and planetarium
Thunderbolt Museum	Thunderbolt	Chatham	Colonial Coast	Local history	website
Tidelands Nature Center	Jekyll Island	Glynn	Colonial Coast	Natural history	website
Tifton Museum of Arts & Heritage	Tifton	Tift	Plantation Trace	Art	website
Travelers Rest State Historic Site	Toccoa	Stephens	Northeast	Historic house	Early 19th-century tavern and inn
Tubman Museum	Macon	Bibb	Historic Heartland	African American	Art, history and culture of African Americans
Tunnel Hill Heritage Center	Tunnel Hill	Whitfield	Northwest	Multiple	website, local history museum, historic railroad tunnel and train viewing
Turner Center For The Arts	Valdosta	Lowndes	Plantation Trace	Art	website
Ty Cobb Museum	Royston	Franklin	Northeast	Biographical	Baseball player Ty Cobb
U.S. Army Signal Corps Museum	Augusta	Richmond	Classic South	Military	website, history of the Signal Corps, development of Fort Gordon and vicinity, and the U.S. Army
Uncle Remus Museum	Eatonton	Putnam	Historic Heartland	Media	website, log cabin created from two slave cabins, dedicated to portraying Southern life as in the Uncle Remus stories
Valdosta State University Fine Arts Gallery	Valdosta	Lowndes	Plantation Trace	Art	website, located in the Fine Arts Building
Vidalia Onion Museum	Vidalia	Toombs	Magnolia Midlands	Food	website, history of the Vidalia onion and its growing region
Vogel State Park	Blairsville	Union	Northeast	History	Includes Vogel Museum about the CCC
Waffle House Museum	Decatur	DeKalb	Metro Atlanta	Food	website, restored 1955 site of the first Waffle House restaurant, features restaurant memorabilia
Walker County Regional Heritage/Train Museum	Chickamauga	Walker	Northwest	Multiple	information, local history, railroad history and model trains
Walker Hill	Griffin	Spalding	Metro Atlanta	Historic house	website, unique exhibits from the early 1900s
Walker-Peters-Langdon House	Columbus	Muscogee	Presidential Pathways	Historic house	website, operated by Historic Columbus, early 19th-century house
Washington Historical Museum	Washington	Wilkes	Classic South	Historic house	Mid-19th-century period antebellum house
Webb Military Museum	Savannah	Chatham	Colonial Coast	US military	Website, military artifacts from Civil War to Cold War, free to active duty military
West Georgia Museum	Tallapoosa	Haralson	Northwest	Multiple	website, local and natural history, includes replicas of old stores, a barber shop and a bank, and dinosaur models
Westville	Columbus	Muscogee	Presidential Pathways	Living	19th-century rural village, website
William Root House Museum and Garden	Marietta	Cobb	Metro Atlanta	Historic house	website, operated by Cobb Landmarks & Historical Society, 1850s period house
Woodruff Farm House	Columbus	Muscogee	Presidential Pathways	Historic house	website, operated by Historic Columbus, 1840s farm house
World War II Flight Training Museum	Douglas	Coffee	Magnolia Midlands	Aviation	website
Wormsloe Historic Site	Savannah	Chatham	Colonial Coast	Local history	Former 18th-century plantation site and museum

== Defunct museums ==
- Bruce Weiner Microcar Museum, Madison, closed in 2012
- C. E. Blevins Avian Learning Center, Cohutta, collections moved to Chattanooga Arboretum and Nature Center
- Coweta County Heritage Museum and Research Center, Newnan, closed in 2012
- Fort Discovery, Augusta, closed in 2010
- Georgia Children's Museum, Macon, closed in 2014
- Georgia Music Hall of Fame, Macon, closed in 2011
- Lewis Grizzard Museum, Moreland, closed in 2011, collections now at the Moreland Hometown Heritage Museum
- Nash Farm Battlefield Museum, closed June 1, 2017
- National Museum of Patriotism, Atlanta, closed in 2010
- Old Mill Motorcycle Museum, Juliette, photos
- SciTrek, a science museum in Atlanta
- Stone Mountain Antique Car and Treasure Museum, Stone Mountain, closed in 2008, featured vintage cars and antique items
- U.S. Navy Supply Corps Museum, Athens, closed in 2010

== Tourism regions ==
The Georgia Department of Economic Development has defined nine tourism regions as listed below with their associated travel associations as footnotes.

=== Classic South ===
East central part of the state, includes the city of Augusta

=== Georgia Coast ===
Also known as the Colonial Coast, includes the city of Savannah

=== Historic Heartland ===
Central part of the state, includes the cities of Macon and Athens

=== Northwest Georgia ===
Northwest region, includes Chickamauga

=== Magnolia Midlands ===
Southeast section, includes Statesboro, Counties: Appling, Atkinson, Bacon, Bleckley, Bulloch, Candler, Coffee, Dodge, Evans, Irwin, Jeff Davis, Laurens, Long, Montgomery, Pulaski, Screven, Tattnall, Telfair, Toombs, Treutlen, Wayne, Wheeler, and Wilcox.

=== Northeast Georgia Mountains ===
Northeast region, counties: Banks, Dawson, Elbert, Forsyth, Franklin, Habersham, Hall, Hart, Jackson, Lumpkin, Madison, Rabun, Stephens, Towns, Union, and White

=== Plantation Trace ===
Rural southwestern section, includes Fitzgerald

=== Presidential Pathways ===
West central section, includes Columbus and Plains

== See also ==
Lists of other institutions in Georgia similar to museums:

- Aquaria (category)
- Historical societies in Georgia
- Nature centers in Georgia
