= List of museums in Atlanta =

This list of museums in Atlanta is a list of museums, defined for this context as institutions (including nonprofit organizations, government entities, and private businesses) that collect and care for objects of cultural, artistic, scientific, or historical interest and make their collections or related exhibits available for public viewing. Also included are non-profit and university art galleries. Museums that exist only in cyberspace (i.e., virtual museums) are not included.

This list includes museums in the City of Atlanta and the immediately adjacent communities of Druid Hills, and Hapeville at Atlanta's airport. For museums in the rest of Metro Atlanta and the rest of the state of Georgia, see List of museums in Georgia (U.S. state).

== Museums ==
Name	Image	Area	Type	Summary
APEX Museum		Sweet Auburn	African American	Contributions of African Americans to the United States and the world
Atlanta Contemporary Art Center		West Midtown	Art	Local, national, and international contemporary art; education geared toward working artists and collectors of art
Atlanta History Center		Buckhead	History	History of Atlanta and Georgia; includes the Centennial Olympic Games Museum and one of the nation's most complete Civil War exhibitions
Atlanta Monetary Museum		Midtown Atlanta	Numismatic	History of money, banking in America, and the Federal Reserve, operated by the Federal Reserve Bank of Atlanta
Booth Western Art Museum		Cartersville	Art	The world's largest permanent exhibition space for Western art.
The Breman Museum		Midtown Atlanta	Jewish	Jewish history, with special emphasis on Georgia and the Holocaust
Callanwolde Fine Arts Center		Druid Hills	Art	Community arts center, gallery hosts one-person and occasional group exhibitions by emerging local artists in varied media
Center for Puppetry Arts		Midtown Atlanta	Puppetry	Puppets from various time periods and countries around the world
Children's Museum of Atlanta		Luckie Marietta	Children's	Formerly known as ""Imagine It! The Children's Museum of Atlanta"
Clark Atlanta University Art Museum		West End	Art	African American art
College Football Hall of Fame		Luckie Marietta	Sports	Honors collegiate athletes from around the country
David J. Sencer CDC Museum		Druid Hills	Medical	Public health issues, operated by the Centers for Disease Control and Prevention
Delta Flight Museum		Hapeville	Aviation	Aircraft, aviation, and history of Delta Air Lines
Dignity Museum		College Park	Homelessness	Homelessness, Poverty, Justice
Fernbank Museum of Natural History		Druid Hills	Natural history	Natural history and the development of the planet
Fernbank Science Center		Druid Hills	Science	Planetarium, telescope, and Fernbank Forest, a 65-acre (26 ha) natural forest
Ferst Center for the Arts		Midtown Atlanta	Art	Contemporary art and photography
Georgia Capitol Museum		South Downtown	History	Collections representing the natural and cultural history of Georgia
Georgia Governor's Mansion		Buckhead	Historic house	Mid 20th century official home of the state's governors
Hammonds House Museum		West End	African American	African American fine art, culture of the African diaspora; located in a historic Queen Anne-style house
Hapeville Depot Museum		Hapeville	Local history	Historic 1890 train depot featuring local history. The museum is operated by the City of Hapeville.
Herndon Home		West End	Historic house	House of Alonzo Franklin Herndon, a rags-to-riches hero who was born into slavery and went on to become Atlanta's first black millionaire
High Museum of Art		Midtown Atlanta	Art	Southeast's leading art museum and among the 100 most-visited art museums in the world; significant permanent collection of 19th and 20th century American art, European art, decorative arts, African American art, modern and contemporary art, photography and African art; traveling exhibitions
Ivan Allen Jr. Braves Museum and Hall of Fame		Summerhill	Sports	Atlanta Braves history and memorabilia
Jimmy Carter Library and Museum		Poncey-Highland	Biographical	Presidential library with papers and exhibits about President Jimmy Carter and the Carter family's life
Martin Luther King Jr. National Historical Park		Old Fourth Ward	History	Covers the American Civil Rights Movement, the preserved boyhood home of Dr. King, the church where he pastored, and his final resting place
Margaret Mitchell House & Museum		Midtown Atlanta	Historic house	Life of Gone with the Wind author Margaret Mitchell and Gone with the Wind museum, operated by the Atlanta History Center
Michael C. Carlos Museum		Druid Hills	Art	Art from ancient Egypt, Greece, Rome, the Near East, and the ancient Americas, 19th- and 20th-century sub-Saharan African art, and European and American works on paper from the Renaissance to the present day; largest collection of ancient art in the Southeast
Millennium Gate		Atlantic Station	Art	Georgia history, architecture, culture and philanthropic heritage
Museum of Contemporary Art of Georgia		Buckhead	Art	Archive of hundreds of contemporary works by Georgia artists in painting, print, sculpture and photography
Museum of Design Atlanta		Midtown Atlanta	Design	Only design museum in the Southeast; devoted exclusively to the study and celebration of design in architecture, products, interiors, furniture, graphics, fashion
National Museum of Decorative Painting		Midtown Atlanta	Art	Collects, preserves, and exhibits a variety of items from around the world and across many time periods that are examples of the art of decorative painting, including historic and contemporary decorated items, open by appointment
Omenala Griot Afrocentric Teaching Museum		West End	African American	Afrocentric teaching museum
Rhodes Hall		Midtown Atlanta	Historic house	1904 Romanesque Revival 9,000-square-foot (840 m^{2}) mansion inspired by Rhineland castles
Robert C. Williams Museum of Papermaking		Midtown Atlanta	Art	Changing paper art exhibits, and science and technology of papermaking; allows visitors to create their own paper
Spelman College Museum of Fine Art		West End	Art	Art by and about women of the African diaspora
Swan House		Buckhead	Historic house	1920s–1930s period furnishings, operated by the Atlanta History Center
Teaching Museum South		Hapeville	Multiple	Open for school groups only
The Oddities Museum		Chamblee	Natural History	Specializing in natural and un-natural history
The Warehouse		Westside District Atlanta; Chattahoochee Ave	Art	Over 400 works of art open free to the public
Tullie Smith House		Buckhead	Historic house	1840 plantation farm house, operated by the Atlanta History Center
World of Coca-Cola		Luckie Marietta	Corporate	Coca-Cola history and memorabilia
Wren's Nest		West End	Historic house	Late 19th century home of Joel Chandler Harris, author of the Tales of Uncle Remus

== Defunct museums ==
- Atlanta Cyclorama & Civil War Museum, closed in 2015, cyclorama now at the Atlanta History Center

== See also ==
- Historic landmarks in Georgia
- Museums list
- Nature Centers in Georgia
- Registered Historic Places in Georgia
