= Tom Poland =

American writer (born 1949)

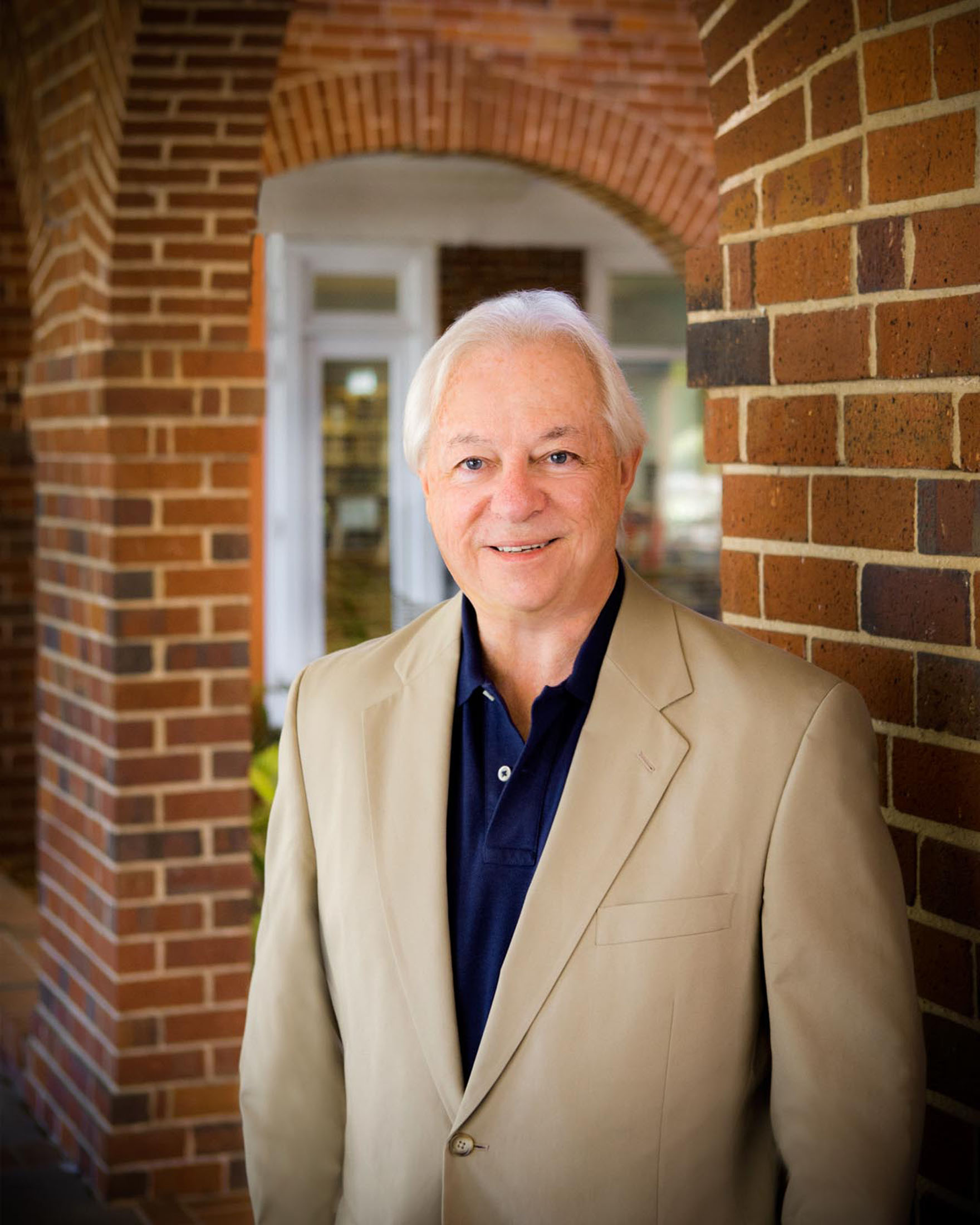
- Born: February 4, 1949 (age 77); Augusta, Georgia
- Education: University of Georgia
- Occupations: Author, Public Speaker
- Website: www.tompoland.net

Thomas Mitchell Poland (born February 4, 1949) is an American writer. He graduated from Lincoln High School in Lincolnton, Georgia. He earned a Bachelor of Arts in journalism and a master's degree in education from the University of Georgia. A frequent contributor to magazines, he has written approximately 1,200 features.

His novel, Forbidden Island ... An Island Called Sapelo (ISBN 1425992021), deals with themes of hope and destruction: man's alteration of the Earth and man's efforts to stave off the inevitable loss of family.

He was the 2011–2012 playwright for Swamp Gravy, Georgia's official folk life drama. His play, Solid Ground, presents the hardships, joys, and beauty of the farming life in south Georgia. Save The Last Dance For Me, a book on how the blues led to beach music and the shag phenomenon along the Carolina beaches, was published by the University of South Carolina Press in the summer of 2012. He contributed to State of the Heart, an anthology of writers who contributed essays about their favorite places in South Carolina, foreword by Pat Conroy, edited by Aida Rogers and published by the University of South Carolina Press.

Reflections of South Carolina, Vol. II was published by the University of South Carolina Press in 2014, with foreword by Mary Alice Monroe. The History Press of Charleston published Classic Carolina Road Trips in 2014, and South Carolina Country Roads in April 2018. Georgialina, A Southland As We Knew It was published in November 2015 by the University of South Carolina Press. Arcadia Publishing published “The Last Sunday Drive” in November 2019. Carolina Bays: Wild, Mysterious, and Majestic Landforms was published by the University of South Carolina Press in 2020

He lives in Columbia, South Carolina where he shared his writing approach for 19 years as an adjunct professor at the University of South Carolina's College of Mass Information and Library Studies. As a member of the South Carolina Humanities Speakers Bureau, he is often invited to give presentations on the state’s culture and history. In 2018, Governor Henry McMaster awarded Poland the Order of the Palmetto for his significant contributions in heralding the unique heritage of South Carolina.
