= List of nature centers in Georgia (U.S. state) =

This is a list of nature centers and environmental education centers in the state of Georgia.

To use the sortable tables: click on the icons at the top of each column to sort that column in alphabetical order; click again for reverse alphabetical order.

Name	Location	County	Region	Summary
Autrey Mill Nature Preserve & Heritage Center	Johns Creek	Fulton	Metro Atlanta	46 acres, features live animals, trails, heritage village, replica Native American dwellings
Big Haynes Creek Nature Center	Conyers	Rockdale	Metro Atlanta	website, 173 acres of the Georgia International Horse Park, features 5 miles of trails, discovery stations, a canoe launch, observation platform
Birdsong Nature Center	Thomasville	Thomas	Southwest	website, 565 acres with 12 miles of trails
Blue Heron Nature Preserve	Atlanta	Fulton	Metro Atlanta	website, 25 acres
Burton 4-H Center on Tybee Island	Tybee Island	Chatham	Colonial Coast	website, 6 acres, environmental education programs for school groups
Cato Environmental Education Center	Austell	Cobb	Metro Atlanta	website, 12 acres, open only for scheduled programs and not open for daily public access, operated by the County
Cay Creek Wetlands Interpretive Center	Midway	Liberty	Colonial Coast	information, operated by the town
Center for Wildlife Education and Lamar Q Ball, Jr. Raptor Center	Statesboro	Bulloch	Southeast	Operated by Georgia Southern University, 17 acres, education center about native wildlife with live animals and animal programs
Charlie Elliott Wildlife Center	Mansfield	Newton	Metro Atlanta	6,400 acres, operated by the Georgia Department of Natural Resources
Chattahoochee Nature Center	Roswell	Fulton	Metro Atlanta	127 acres
Cochran Mill Nature Center	Palmetto	Fulton	Metro Atlanta	website, 50 acres
Davidson-Arabia Mountain Nature Center	Lithonia	DeKalb	Metro Atlanta	2,550 acres preserve
Dauset Trails Nature Center	Jackson	Butts	Metro Atlanta	1,400 acres, features rehabilitated native wildlife, 19th century working farm and farm animals, over 20 miles of trails for mountain biking and hiking, horse trails
Driftwood Education Center	St. Simons Island	Glynn	Southeast	website, day and residential classes about aquatic ecosystems
Dunwoody Nature Center	Dunwoody	DeKalb	Metro Atlanta	website, private center located in municipal Dunwoody Park
Elachee Nature Science Center	Gainesville	Hall	Metro Atlanta	website, 1,500 acre Chicopee Woods Nature Preserve with 13 miles of hiking trails
Fortson 4-H Center	Hampton	Henry	Metro Atlanta	website, 77 acres, day and residential environmental education programs for students, family programs monthly
Georgia Sea Turtle Center	Jekyll Island	Glynn	Southeast	website, sea turtle rescue center, features interactive exhibits, daily presentations, patient viewing areas
Grand Bay Wetland Education Center	Lenox	Lowndes	Southeast	8,700-acre Grand Bay Wetlands Management Area, operated by the Coastal Plains Regional Educational Service Agency and the Georgia Department of Natural Resources
Gwinnett Environmental and Heritage Center	Buford	Gwinnett	Metro Atlanta	website, 700-acre campus with greenspace and walking trails, exhibits on water and water conservation, local history, 1930s period farm, historic post office
Fernbank Museum of Natural History	Atlanta	DeKalb	Metro Atlanta	Natural history of Georgia, dinosaurs, Okefenokee Swamp, shells, Native Americans, culture through clothing, jewelry and body art, Naturalist Center, 65-acre forest
Indian Springs State Park	Jackson	Butts	Metro Atlanta	528 acres, features the Dauset Trails Nature Center
Jekyll Island 4-H Center	Jekyll Island	Glynn	Southeast	website, day and residential environmental education programs for students
John W. Stevens Wetlands Education Center	Richmond Hill	Bryan	Colonial Coast	website, video, operated by the City, located in 335-acre J. F. Gregory Recreational Park
McDuffie Environmental Education Center	Dearing	McDuffie	East Central	website, programs for school groups, features three diverse habitats, two trails, a hands-on discovery room, indoor classrooms and several outdoor classroom areas
Melvin L. Newman Wetlands Center	Hampton	Clayton	Metro Atlanta	website, 32 acres, operated by the Clayton County Water Authority
Mill Creek Nature Center	Buford	Gwinnett	Metro Atlanta	website, 88-acre wetlands/wildlife preserve owned and managed by the Georgia Wildlife Federation
Oatland Island Wildlife Center	Savannah	Chatham	Colonial Coast	website, outdoor displays of Georgia wildlife and farm animals
Oxbow Meadows Environmental Learning Center	Columbus	Muscogee	West Central	website, outreach program of Columbus State University, operated in association with Columbus Water Works, features reptiles and aquariums
Panola Mountain State Park Nature Center	Stockbridge	Henry	Metro Atlanta	1,635 acres, programs about the park and Arabia Mountain
Pettit Environmental Preserve	Cartersville	Bartow	Metro Atlanta	website, 70 acres plus 9 acre lake, hiking trails, pre-k through 12th grade school field trip programs, public educational events, open only for scheduled programs
Phinizy Swamp Nature Park	Augusta	Richmond	East Central	website, 1,100 acres, operated by the Phinizy Center for Water Sciences, education and research about the swamp watershed and Savannah River basin
Reed Creek Nature Park and Interpretive Center	Martinez	Columbia	East Central	website, operated by the County
Reynolds Nature Preserve	Morrow	Clayton	Metro Atlanta	146 acres, live animals, environmental displays, operated by the County
Rock Eagle 4-H Center	Eatonton	Putnam	Metro Atlanta	website, offers day and residential environmental education programs, Saturday public programs
Sandy Creek Nature Center	Athens	Clarke	Central	website, 225 acres with over 4 miles of trails, operated by the County
Sapelo Island Visitors Center	Sapelo Island	McIntosh	Colonial Coast	website, provides tour opportunities and educational experiences for the island alongside exhibits on its natural and cultural heritage.
Savannah-Ogeechee Canal Museum & Nature Center	Savannah	Chatham	Colonial Coast	Exhibits on canal history, archaeology, birding and local attractions, almost 200 acres of swamp and woodland with 5 miles of trails
Sawnee Mountain Preserve	Cumming	Forsyth	Metro Atlanta	963 acres, environmental education programs, managed by the Outdoor Division of Forsyth County Parks and Recreation
Stephen C. Foster State Park	Fargo	Charlton	Colonial Coast	80 acres, Suwannee River Visitor Center features exhibits about the animals, plants and ecosystem of the Okefenokee Swamp and other environmental topics
Tidelands Nature Center	Jekyll Island	Glynn	Southeast	website, operated by the University of Georgia College of Agricultural and Environmental Sciences, hands-on marine environmental science programs, live marine animals, reptiles, birds
Tybee Island Marine Science Center	Tybee Island	Chatham	Colonial Coast	website, marine exhibits and marine science programs
Wahsega 4-H Center	Dahlonega	Lumpkin	Metro Atlanta	website, day and residential environmental education programs for students
West Atlanta Watershed Alliance Outdoor Activity Center	Atlanta	Fulton	Metro Atlanta	26 acres
Wright Environmental Education Center	Marietta	Cobb	Metro Atlanta	website, 19 acres, open only for scheduled programs and not open for daily public access, operated by the County

== Resources ==
- Environmental Education in Georgia
- Environmental Education Alliance of Georgia
