= Georgia Radio Hall of Fame =

Museum and hall of fame in Columbus, Georgia, USA

The Georgia Radio Museum and Hall of Fame was a non-profit corporation that honored the men and women of radio broadcasting in the U.S. state of Georgia. It was founded in 2007. The museum's LaGrange location closed in August 2020 due to lack of interest. In 2021, the museum's physical collections were relocated to the Columbus Collective Museums in Columbus, Georgia.

== See also ==
- List of museums in Georgia (U.S. state)
