= Ware–Lyndon House =

Historic house in Georgia, United States

- U.S. National Register of Historic Places
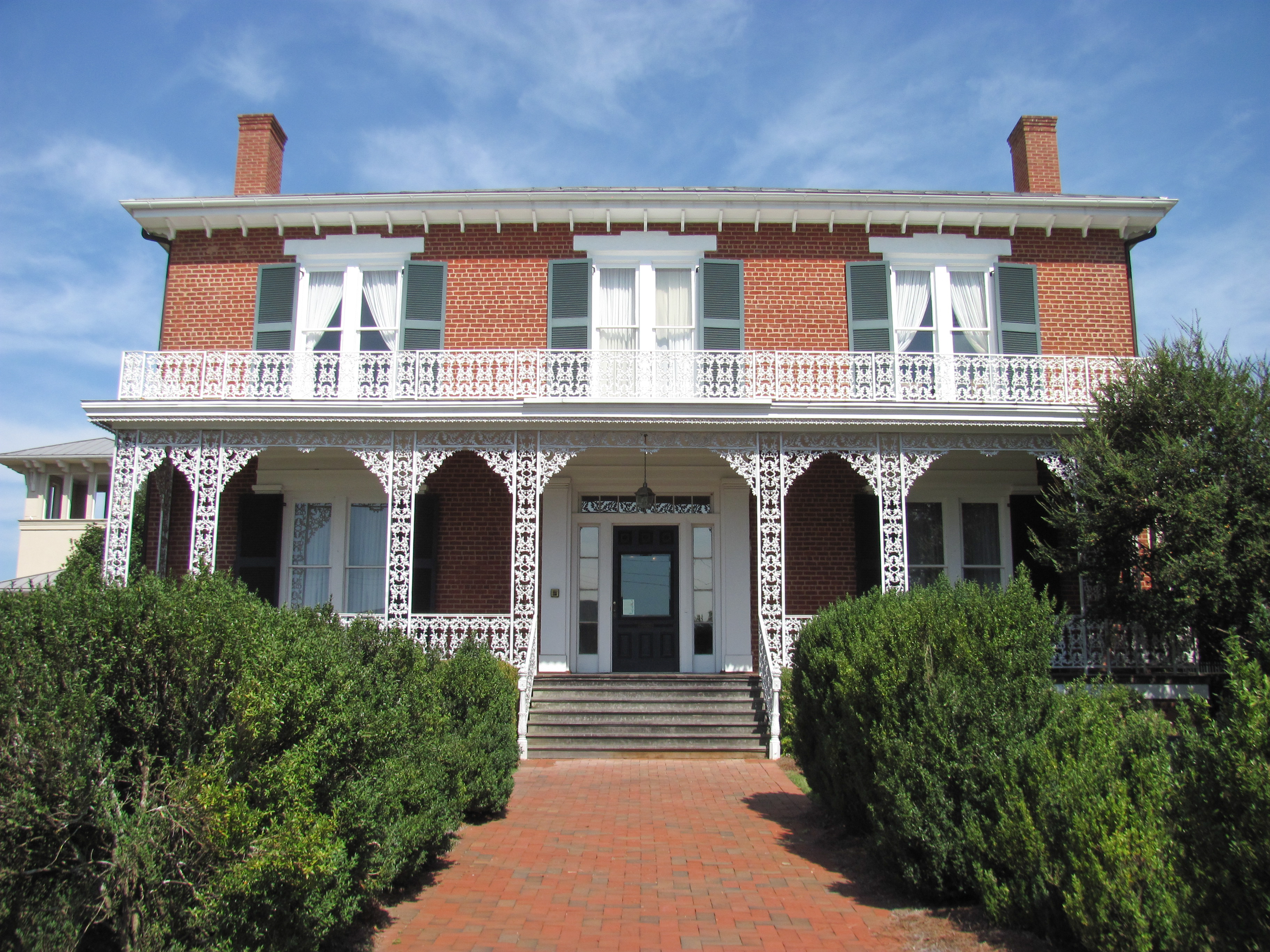
- Front view of the Ware–Lyndon House

- Location within Georgia Location within the United States
- Location: 293 Hoyt Street, Athens, Georgia
- Coordinates: 33°57′50″N 83°22′35″W
- Area: 9 acres (3.6 ha)
- Built: 1850
- Architectural style: Greek Revival
- NRHP reference No.: 76000614
- Added to NRHP: March 15, 1976

The Ware–Lyndon House is a historic house located at 211 Hoyt Street in Athens, Georgia, at the end of Jackson Street. Built circa 1850, the house is two stories and exhibits an Italianate style. Edward R. Ware, its original owner, sold the property to Edward S. Lyndon in 1880. In 1939, the city of Athens purchased the home and a major restoration was made in 1960. In 1976, it was placed on the National Register of Historic Places. It is the only surviving structure from the Lickskillet neighborhood of Athens, one of the most fashionable districts of its time.

== Past owners ==
Edward R. Ware came to Athens in 1829 and was one of Athens' most prominent physicians practicing during the antebellum, Civil War, and post-Civil War periods.

The house was the site of many parties; William Hope Hull (founder of University of Georgia's law school in 1859) described Mrs. Edward R. Ware as "full of life, loving the company of old and young, rich and poor, hospitable to lavishness, never too sick to go to a 'party,' and never too tired to give one…that youthful vivacity and unfeigned cordiality, which added to the other attraction of her elegant home [today the Lyndon House

Arts Center and Museum, a city-owned community arts center] made it one of the centers of social life in Athens."

Edward S. Lyndon, the house's second owner, was a druggist who owned Lyndon Mill.

== Current usage ==
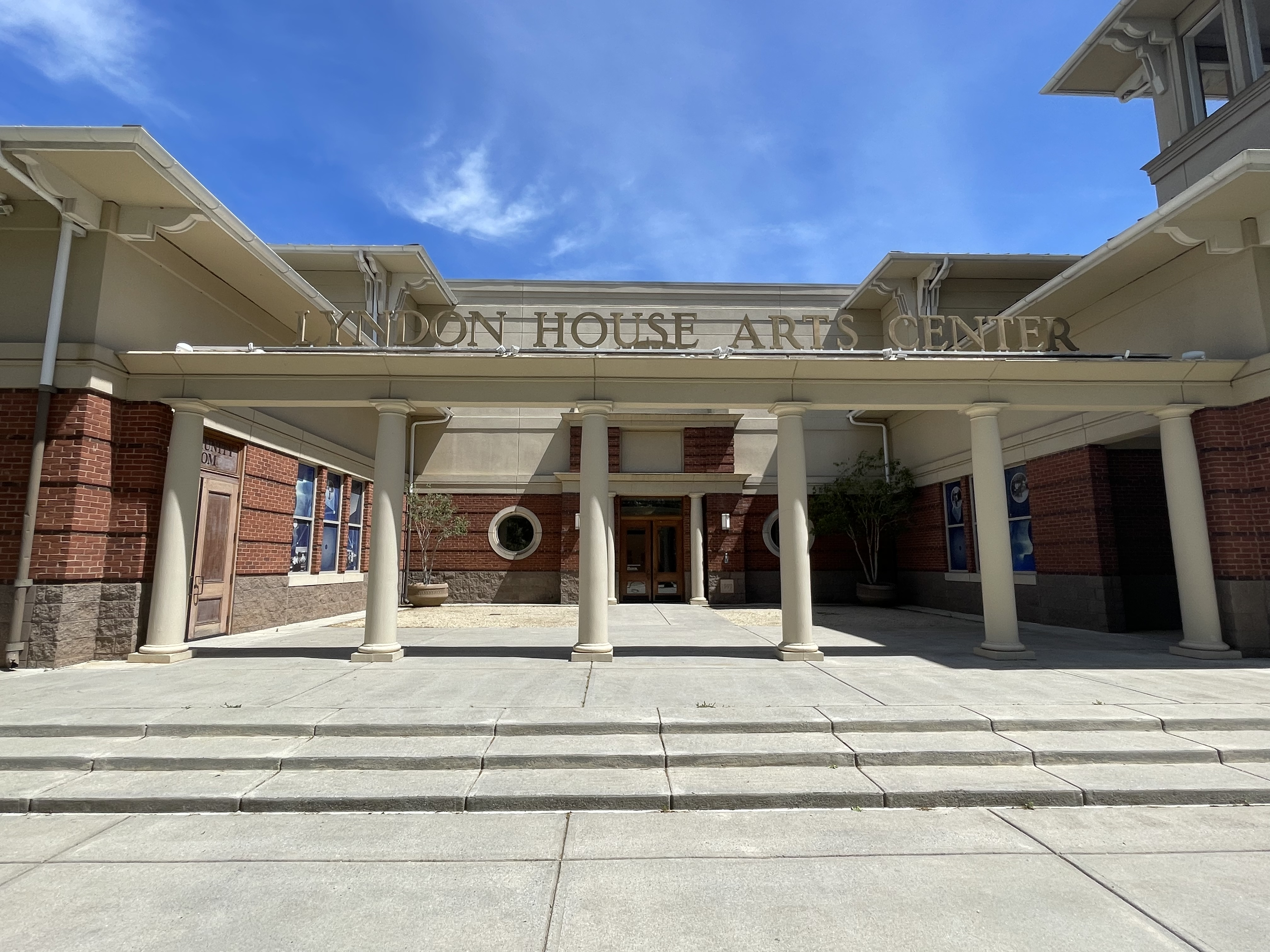
The front entrance to the Lyndon House Arts Center

Since 1973, the house has served as a community arts center and has been known as the Lyndon House Arts Center since its grand opening in May 1999. This 33,000 sq. ft. addition contains galleries, studios, classrooms, and offices and was constructed to preserve the Italianate design of the adjoining original structure. The original house displays period furnishings and is open for self-guided tours.
