= Pace House =

Historic house in Georgia, United States

- U.S. National Register of Historic Places
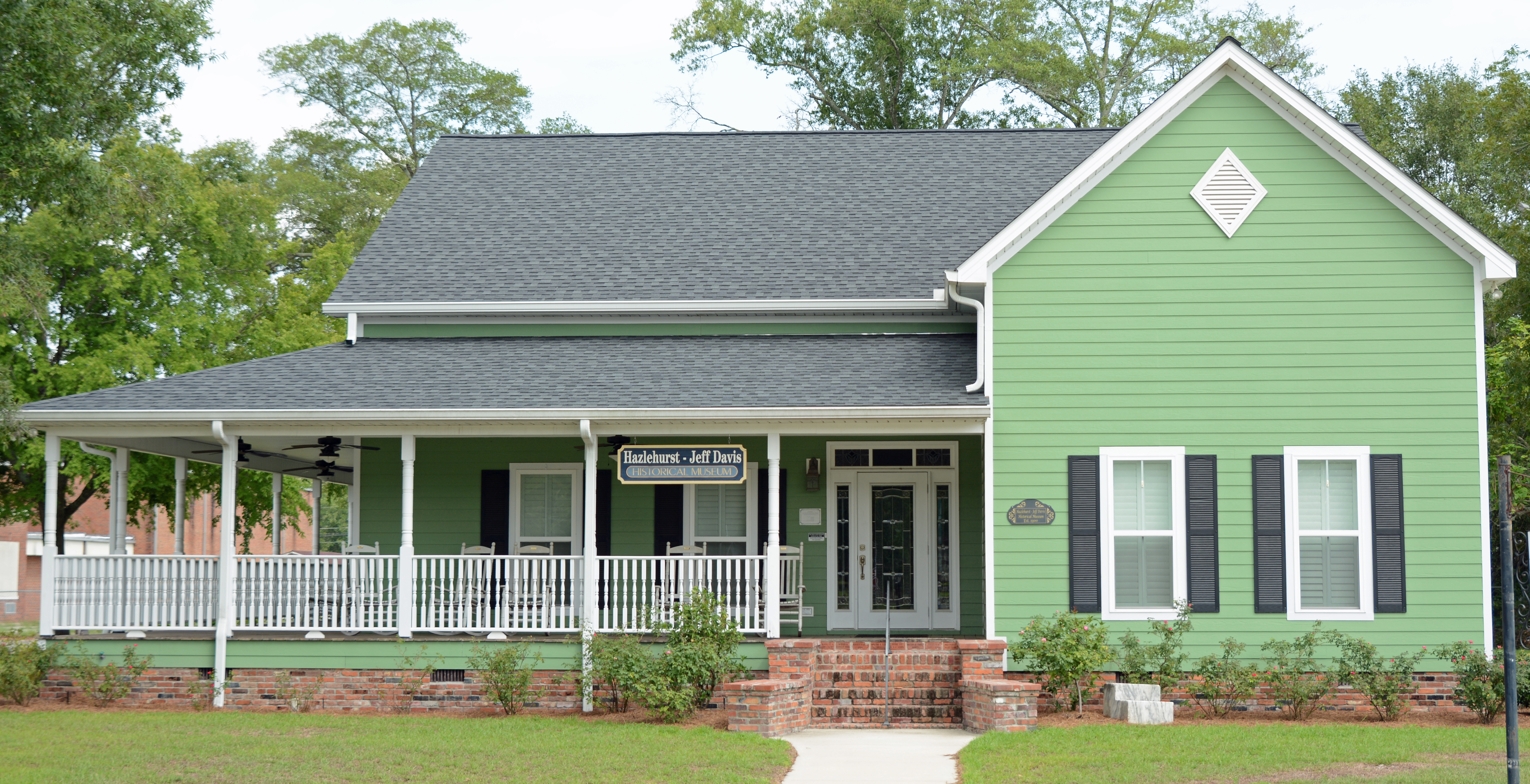

- Location within Georgia Location within the United States
- Location: 61 E. Coffee St., Hazlehurst, Georgia
- Coordinates: 31°52′3″N 82°35′47″W
- Area: less than one acre
- Built: 1900
- Architectural style: Folk Victorian
- NRHP reference No.: 03000591
- Added to NRHP: July 5, 2003

The Pace House in Hazlehurst, Georgia is a "gabled ell cottage" that was originally built c. 1900. It was listed on the National Register of Historic Places in 2003.

It has a cross-gabled roof, two interior brick chimneys and sits on a brick pier foundation. Its interior has a central hallway with two rooms on each side and a kitchen to the rear.

Since 1996 the house has served as the Hazlehurst-Jeff Davis Historical Museum.

The original 1900 house burned in 2011, but the house was rebuilt with attention to historical accuracy.
