= Barrow County Museum =

Museum in Winder, Georgia

Coordinates: 33°59′34″N 83°43′19″W

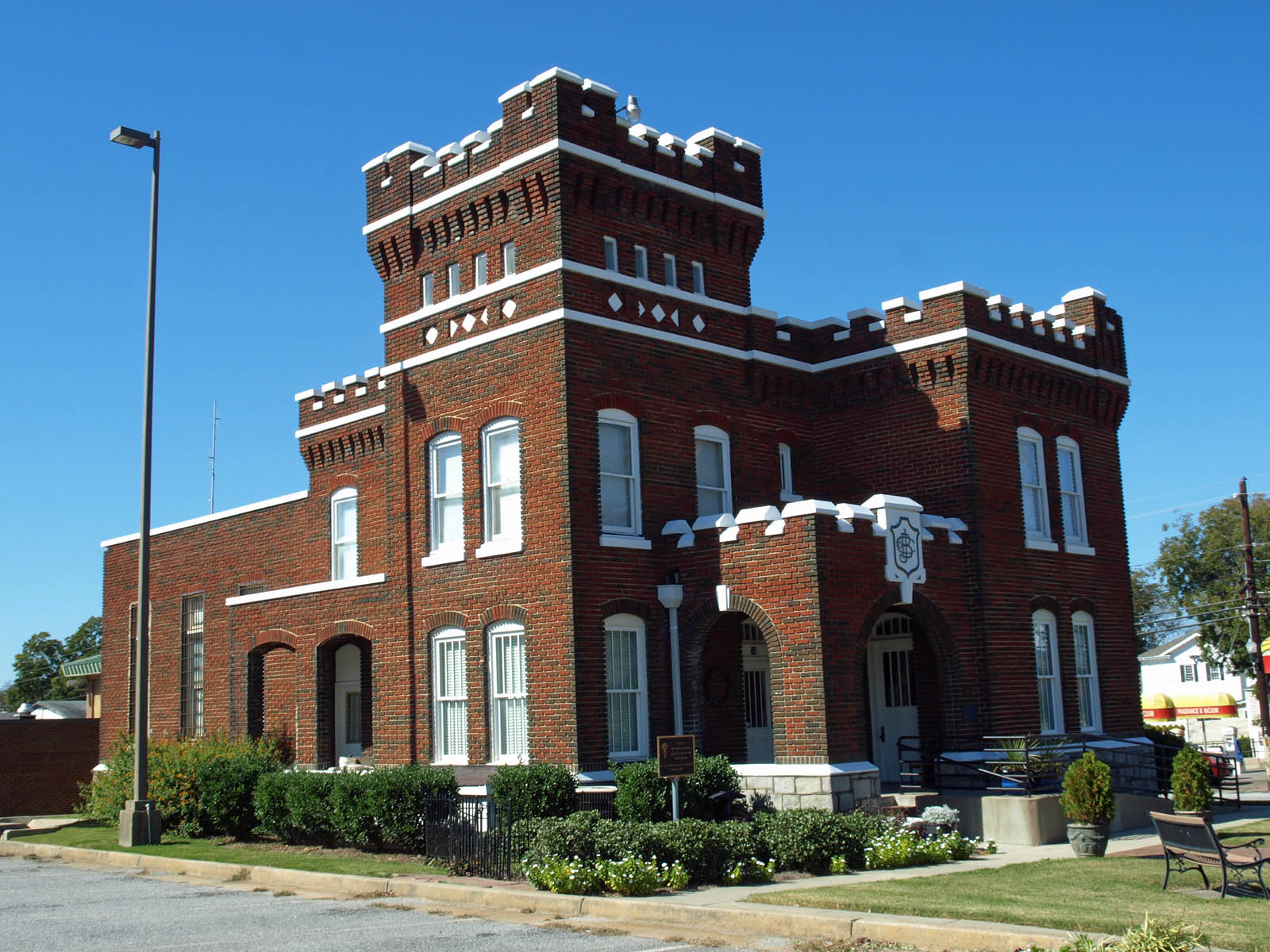
- The museum in 2012
- Established: 1993
- Location: Winder, Georgia
- Type: History museum
- Website: facebook.com/BarrowCountyMuseum

The Barrow County Museum is a museum located in Winder, Georgia. It holds artifacts of Barrow county. It is the home of the Barrow County Historical Society. The museum located in the old Barrow County Jail, built in 1914. It hosts exhibits on Senator Richard B. Russell, county history and Fort Yargo.

A small granite monument honoring the unknown Confederate dead that once stood at Triangle Park in Rosehill Cemetery now resides at the museum.
