= Autrey Mill Nature Preserve & Heritage Center =

Nature center in Johns Creek, Georgia, US

- Location within Georgia
- Location: Johns Creek, Georgia, United States
- Coordinates: 34.02079°N 84.23267°W
- Area: 46 acres (19 ha)
- Established: 1989
- Governing body: Autrey Mill Nature Preserve Association
- Website: www.autreymill.org

The Autrey Mill Nature Preserve & Heritage Center is located in Johns Creek, Georgia, United States.

The property is located on 9770 Autrey Mill Road, Johns Creek, Georgia.

== History ==
The park and the grounds are owned by the city of Johns Creek, GA. The operations are run by its governing body, The Autrey Mill Nature Preserve Association. This association was formed in 1987 by local activist Margaret Krueger with assistance from fellow neighbor Judy Webb to protect and preserve a portion of 240 acres set for development. The site included the remains of an old grist mill, as well as its dam. Philanthropist, John Ripley Forbes, who organized other local preserves such as Chattahoochee Nature Center in Roswell, GA was also an instrumental supporter of the project.

== Property ==
The Preserve and Center contains 46 acres (19 ha) of land. The preserve also contains a 2-mile (3.2 km) walking trail, creek, gardens and many animals. During a 2006 historic assets survey done by Fulton County, archeologists discovered a shaft gold mine, part of the mill foundations, the mill dam site, and remnants of the miller's house foundation. It also lies on land that was previously owned by the Cherokee in 1755. They were later forced off the land in 1830, gradually settling in Oklahoma traveling on the Trail of Tears. The property was granted to settlers in the Cherokee County Gold Lottery of 1832. It passed through several owners before being sold to Ransom Autrey, owner of the grist mill, which operated until the 1900s. Various owners of the property followed, with the last private owners, the Debray family, making extensive building additions to the site during the 1970s.

== Geographic features ==
The area surrounding Autrey Mill houses 28 species of native trees, 58 species of native plants (including the Pink Lady's Slipper orchid), and 110 native wildlife species. Most of the Nature Preserve is covered by forest, with wetlands and a small river known as "Sal's Creek" which runs throughout.

== Heritage Village ==
The Heritage Village consists of several buildings from the site and local area.

- The Visitor Center
- The Farm Museum
- The Summerour House
- The Green General Store
- The Delco Remy Building
- The Warsaw Church

Many of these buildings were moved to the site from different locations in Johns Creek and surrounding environs. The Visitor Center is an original building to the site, dating back to 1860 as a tenant farm house. The Debray family added rooms to the existing structure, and today it serves as the staff offices and display area for animal exhibits. In addition to renovations to the Visitor Center, the Debrays added a carriage house, which is now the Farm Museum. They renovated a 1940s barn on the property, which now serves as the center's teaching center, as well as a small stone chapel which was destroyed by a falling tree in the early 2000s and no longer exists. In concert with the association's conservation goals, several local buildings of distinction were moved to the site when they were compromised by demolition. The first of these buildings was the Summerour House, which was built in the 1880s on the property now owned by Northeast-Spruill Oaks library. It is a Victorian-style Farmhouse with five rooms, constructed by the Summerour family, one of the large landowners in the area. H.H Summerour introduced a popular strain of cotton called "Half and Half" with bolls that were half seed and half lint. Eventually the house and property was sold to the Spruill family in 1918 and moved to Autrey Mill in 1992. Along with the Summerour house, came a small two room tenant house that belonged to the farm. The Old Warsaw Church started out as campground in 1822, supposedly used by the Moravians, and purportedly gave Warsaw its name. A church was built on its campgrounds in the 1860s on Medlock Bridge Road near the intersection of State Bridge. In 2004, it was moved to Autrey Mill and restored in 2008. The heritage village also includes the Green General Store, which was located at the corner of Buice Road and Old Alabama. Owned by the Green Family, it was built in the 1920s and closed in the 1940s. The store, along with its small Delco Remy generator building which supplied power to it, was moved in 2004.

== Heritage Collections ==
Autrey Mill is home to many different types of historical collections, particular to its buildings. The Summerour House and Tenant Farm House have period furniture, household and kitchen items including textiles and photographs representative of life on an early 1900s farm. Notable items are butter churns, chamber pots, laundry washboards and tubs, and a cast iron stove. The Farm museum contains farm tools utilized by early farmers. Notable items include a doctors buggy, a pea sheller, scythes, ploughs and equestrian items. The Green Store has the largest collection, including items sold in the store during its operation, as well as personal items. Notable collection pieces are 1920s quilt tops, garments, glass soda bottles, store ledgers that range from 1920s to 1940s, war mementos and original vintage signage. The Warsaw Church collection includes its original sign, with plaques on the pews commemorating families that belonged to the congregation. The Visitor Center houses the live animal collection, as well as natural history, including the Forsten Native American Exhibit.

== Native American Structures and Collection ==
Near the Forest trail entrance, is a model of a Native American hunting lodge from the 17th century and wooden tipi, built by Tom Blue Wolf and his workmen. In September 2008, a replica Native village was opened at the park. [NATIVE AMERICAN STRUCTURES REMOVED FEB. 2024] In the Visitor Center, a small exhibit of the Forsten collection is on display. The collection was donated by the Forsten family in 2011, and has almost 300 pieces of Southeastern American Indigenous projectile points, gorgets, atlatl weights and other artifacts.

== Animal Collections ==
The Center contains replicas of native animals to Georgia. It also has many live exhibitions of reptiles and amphibians. In addition there are chickens and a rabbit that reside in two enclosed areas outside the Visitor Center.

== Gallery ==
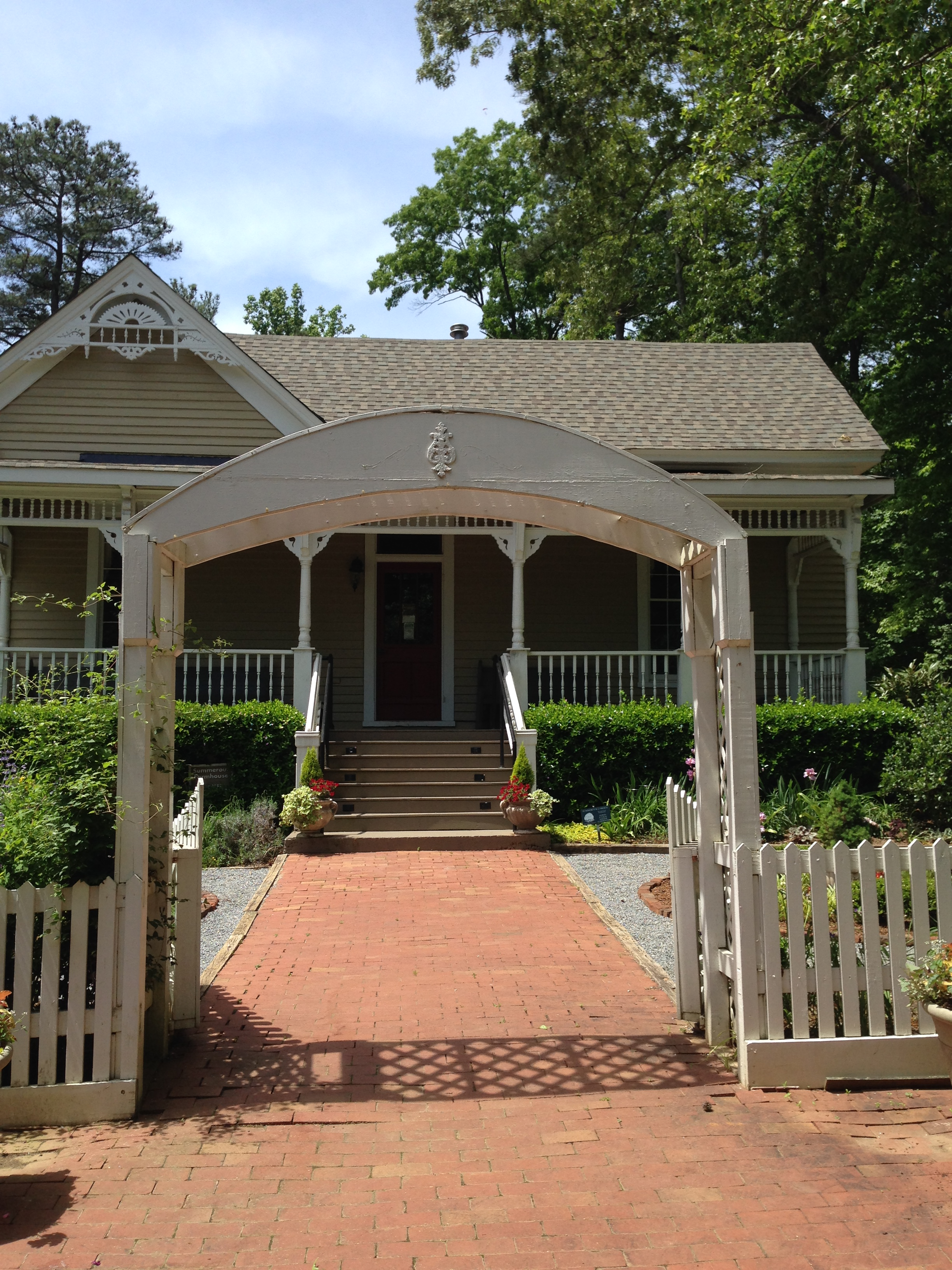
Summerour House

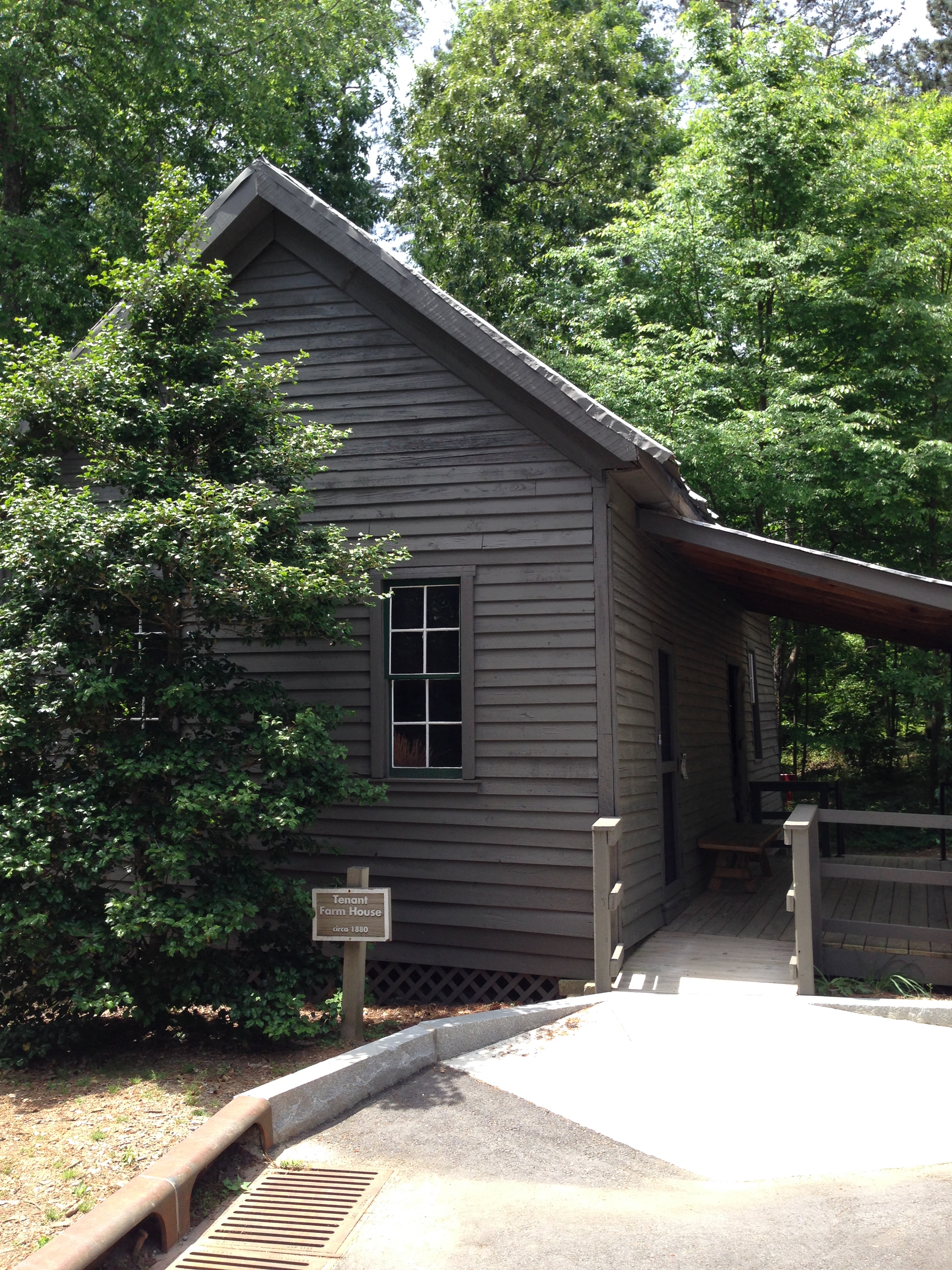
Tenant Farmhouse

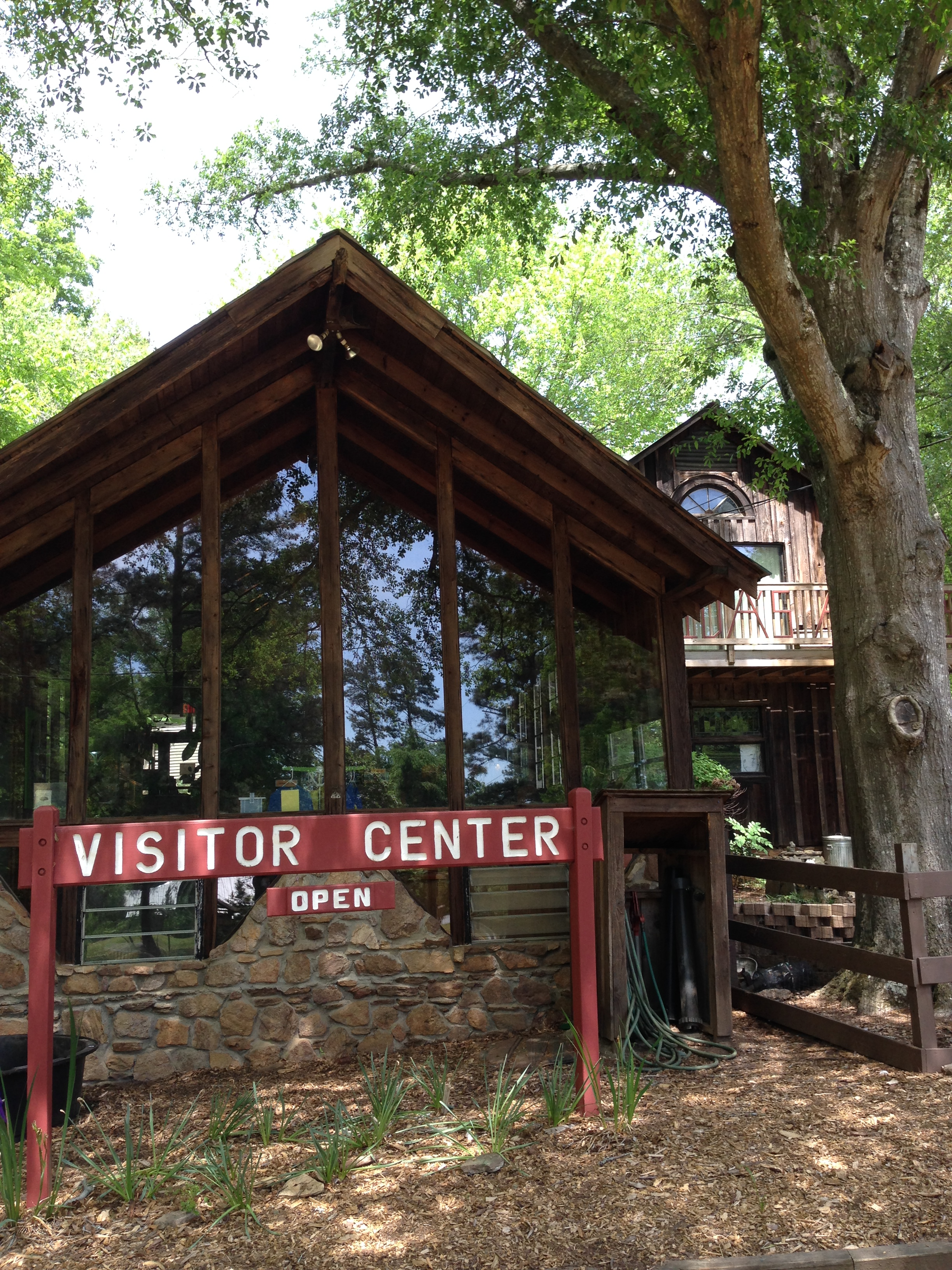
Visitor Center

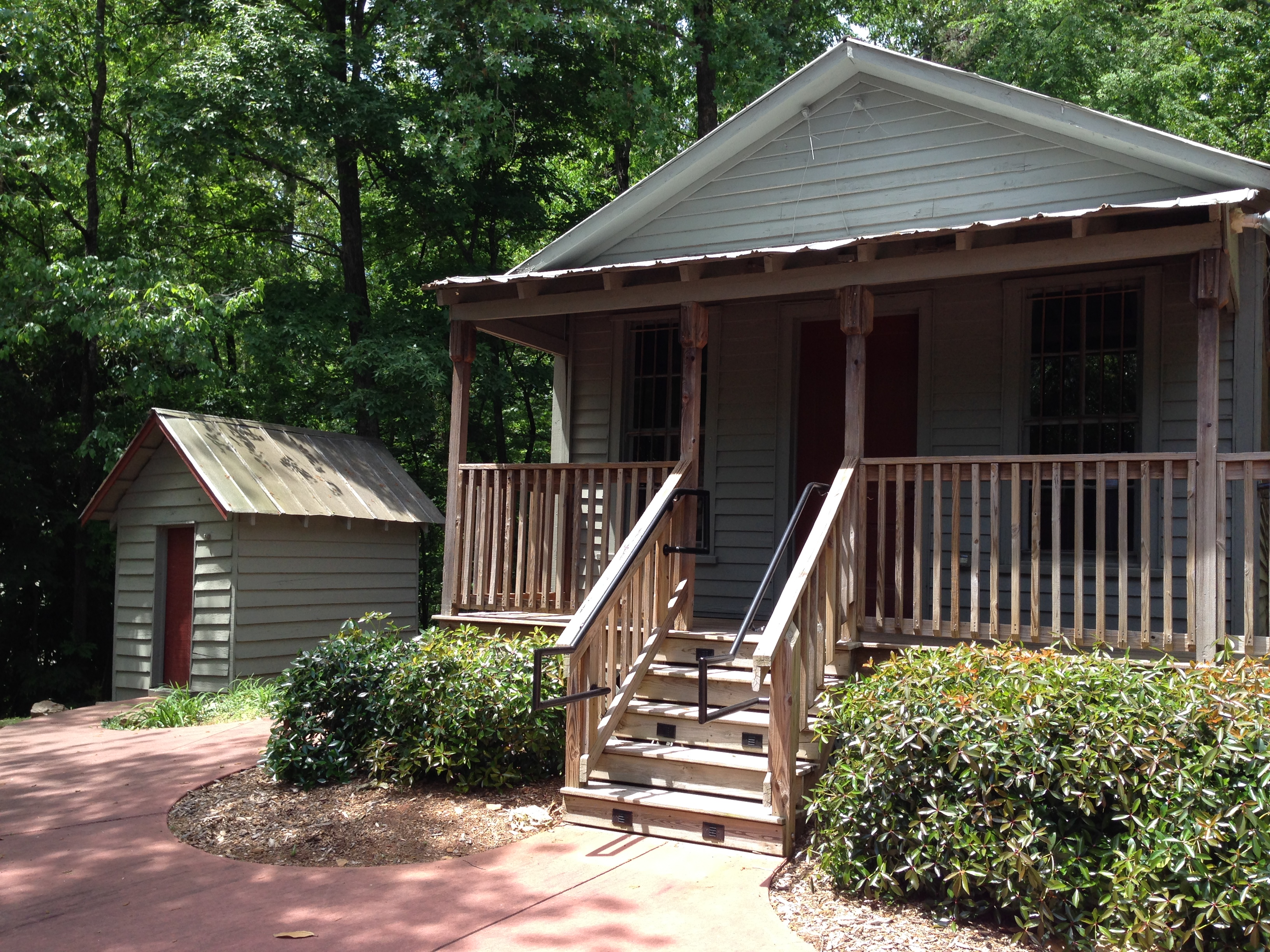
Green Store and Delco Remy Building

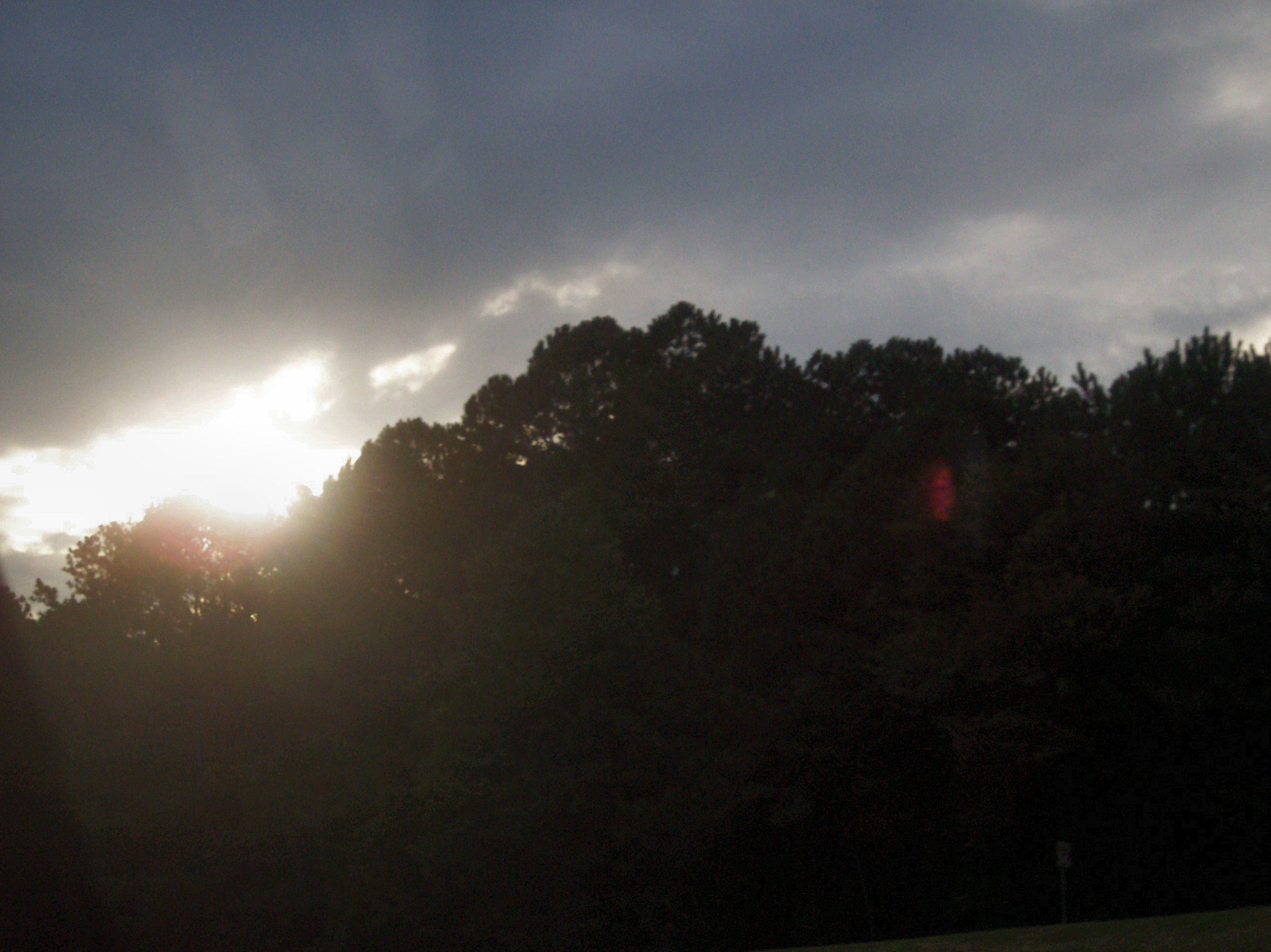
Sunset at Autrey Mill Nature Preserve & Heritage Center

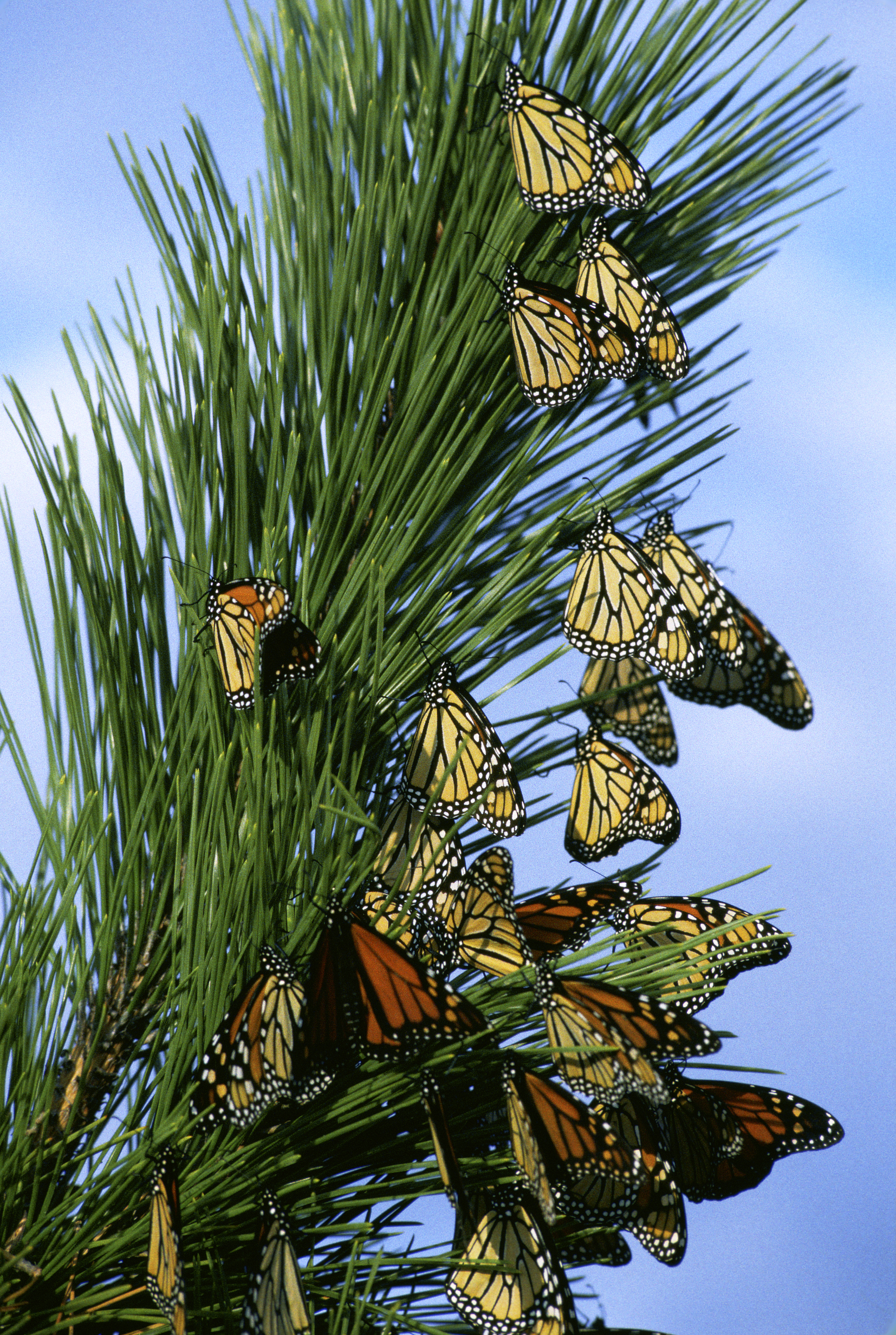
Monarch butterfly migration
