= Centennial Park District =

District of Atlanta, Georgia, U.S.

Coordinates: 33.7610°N 84.3940°W

The Centennial Park District, formerly the Luckie-Marietta District, is a district of Downtown Atlanta named after the walkable neighborhood and entertainment district that surround Centennial Olympic Park. The district was originally created in 2007 by Legacy Properties, in support of their redevelopment projects in the district. However, "Luckie Marietta" was used by a wide range of Atlanta media to refer to the district. The district was rebranded the Centennial Park District and is now under the management of Central Atlanta Progress.

The area was mostly one of industrial and warehouse use (see map) and was in decline after the mid-20th century, even after Centennial Olympic Park was built for the 1996 Olympics.

Developer Legacy's stated goals were to create a district within Downtown Atlanta that would contain entertainment, hotel accommodations and restaurants all within walking distance of each other and of the nearby Mercedes-Benz Stadium, Philips Arena, Georgia World Congress Center, CNN Center, World of Coca-Cola and Georgia Aquarium. It would lure visitors to stay, dine, and be entertained near those facilities and attractions instead of in the Peachtree Center area of Downtown or even Buckhead. Whereas a few years prior, few facilities existed in the area, by 2011, the district counted 25 restaurants and 6 hotels, the Ventana events center and a helipad.

Currently the District is home to a variety of attractions, restaurants and lounges, event spaces, hotels, and office and retail spaces.

== College Football Hall of Fame ==
The College Football Hall of Fame moved to a new facility on the southwest side of Marietta Street, between Foundry and Baker Streets, and opened in 2014.

== Centennial Yards ==
Centennial Yards is a planned mixed use development.

== Geography ==
The Centennial Park District defines its boundaries with Centennial Olympic Park as the center and all properties within 1-2 blocks of the park. The Mercedes-Benz Stadium, Philips Arena and Georgia World Congress Center are included because of their proximity.
