= The Bruce Weiner Microcar Museum =

Former automobile museum in Madison, Georgia, USA

Coordinates: 33°31′59″N 83°27′00″W

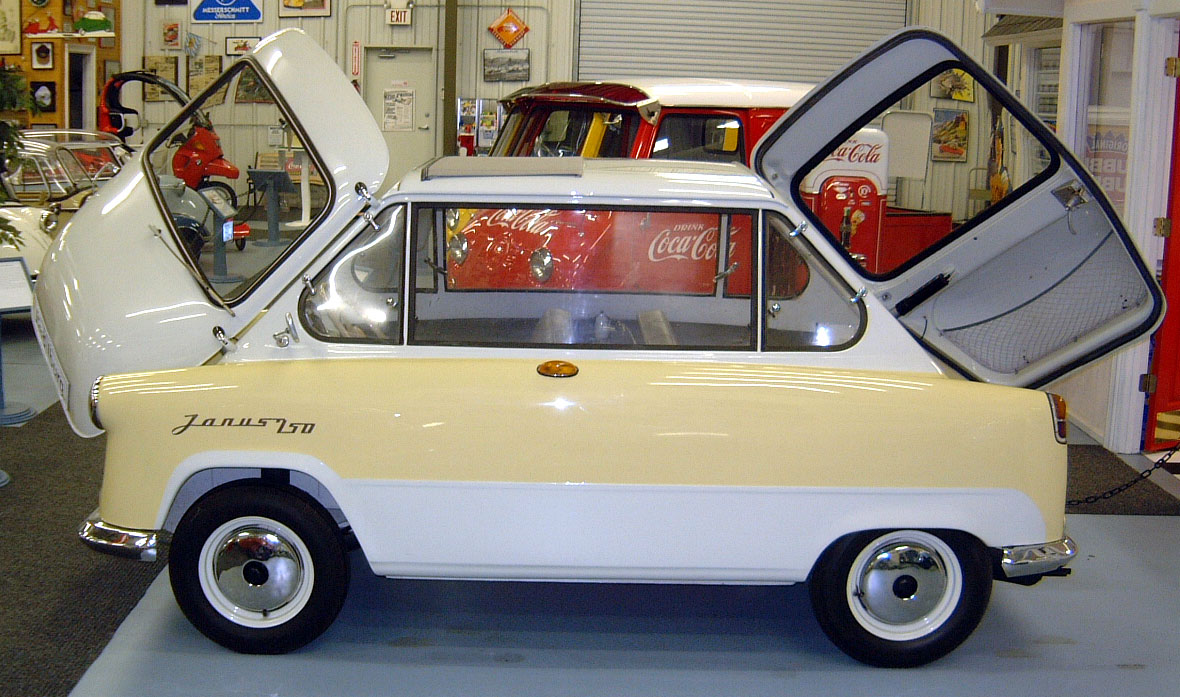
A Zündapp Janus from the museum's collection.

The Bruce Weiner Microcar Museum was a museum in Madison, Georgia, United States, that held a large collection of microcars. The museum was created by Bruce Weiner, an executive of Dubble Bubble, who collected microcars as a hobby.

The entire collection was auctioned off February 15–16, 2013. The top selling price was for Lot 603, a 1958 F.M.R. Tg 500 'Tiger' that sold for $322,000.
