= Pea sheller =

Apparatus designed to take out peas from their pods

A pea sheller is an apparatus designed to take out the peas from their pods. Early models were powered by hand, via a crank; later models are powered by electricity. Certain models can also be used for beans.

The mechanical pea sheller was invented in the 17th century. Typically they press the peas between two rolls, which squeeze out the peas; sometimes the rolls have ridges that slice the pods open. Pea shellers have different types of mechanisms to separate the shells from the pods and other debris. Washing machine rollers can be used, for instance. Currently, pea shellers are made in the US by Welborn Devices of Mississippi, and Lehman's Hardware of Ohio.
