= Reynolds Nature Preserve =

Nature preserve in Morrow, Georgia

Coordinates: 33.5989°N 84.3484°W

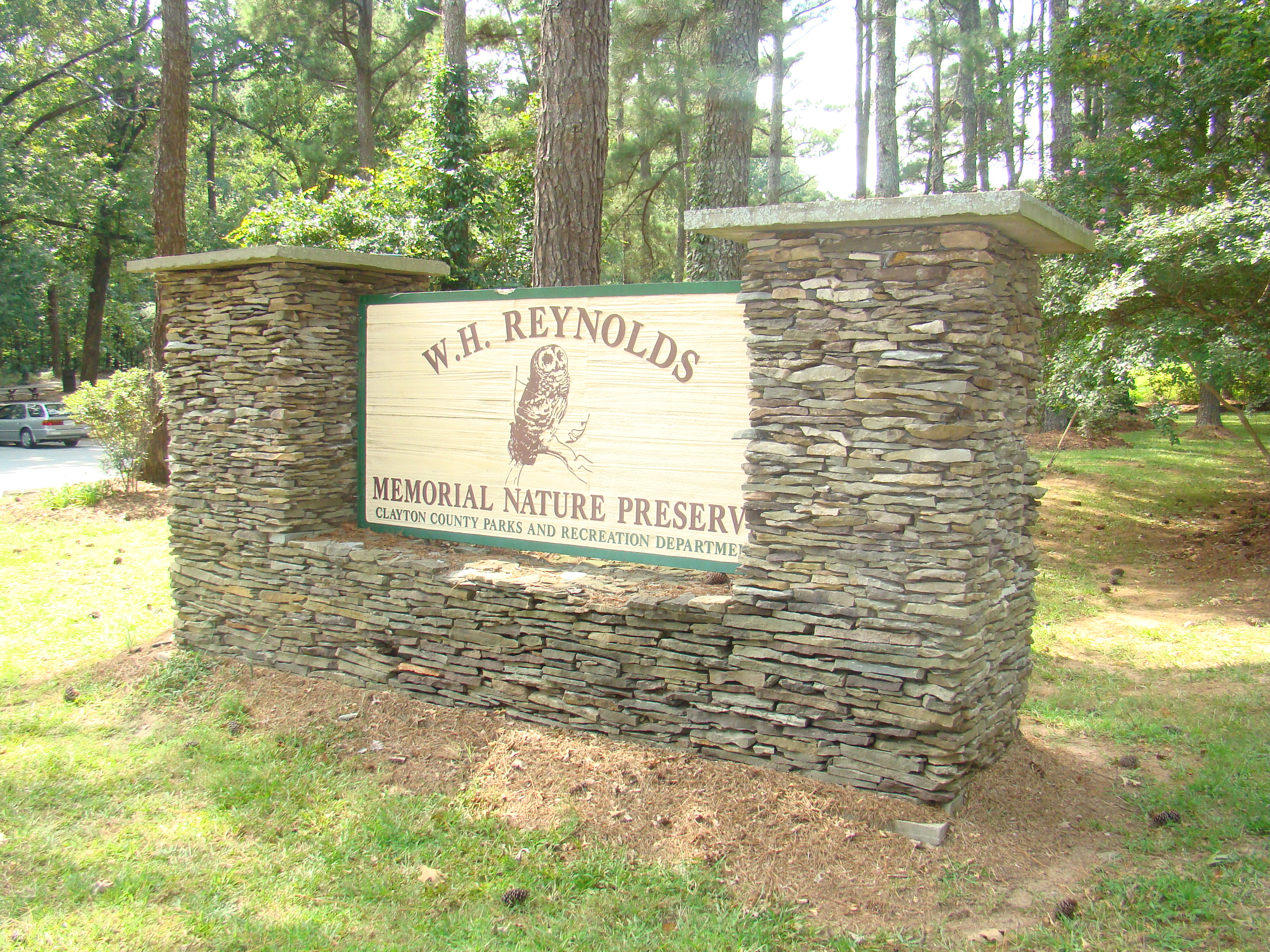
W. H. Reynolds Memorial Nature Preserve

Reynolds Nature Preserve is a 146-acre (59 ha) tract of protected forest located in Morrow, Georgia, United States. The nature preserve is owned and operated by Clayton County Parks and Recreation. The park has three miles (5 km) of hiking trails, a Civil War era farm, native plants path, heritage garden, wildlife ponds, native azaleas, a wildflower field, and an interpretive center.

== History ==
Huie Barn, circa 1867

Robert T.S. Huie was believed to have purchased the property that is now the Reynolds Nature Preserve around the time of the Civil War. HIs soon inherited the property. Any history before this time was burned at the courthouse in Jonesboro, GA during Sherman's March to the Sea. The main farmhouse was originally constructed with four rooms, two upstairs and two downstairs with a chimney in the center. After the war Robert Huie added another fireplace, rooms, porches, and an attic. In the latter half of the 1920s the ever-growing naturalist, self-taught lawyer William Reynolds had purchased the property as his personal nature preserve. The Judge was known for giving tours of the preserve in his Cadillac on what are hiking trails today. At the time of his purchase there were two barns, a springhouse, spring box, corn crib, two tenant farmhouses, and the main farmhouse (closed to the public). Several of these structures or their remains still stand today. Taking advantage of several springs on the land, the Judge constructed the five ponds during the 1930s. In 1976 Judge Reynolds donated 130 acres (53 ha) to the Clayton County government for preservation. Clayton County is the third smallest county in Georgia and the tenth most populated. The county received a federal grant from the Lands and Conservation Fund in 1979 to help provide funds to construct piers, bridges, a pavilion, and the interpretive center. The Reynolds Boards of Trustees purchased an additional 16 acres (6.5 ha) in 1997 along Jesters Creek. Today Reynolds, the bordering Morrow Greenspace Trail and the proposed Lake City Nature Preserve plan to incorporate over 300 acres (120 ha) of protected land among a sprawling Atlanta urban landscape.

== Festivals ==
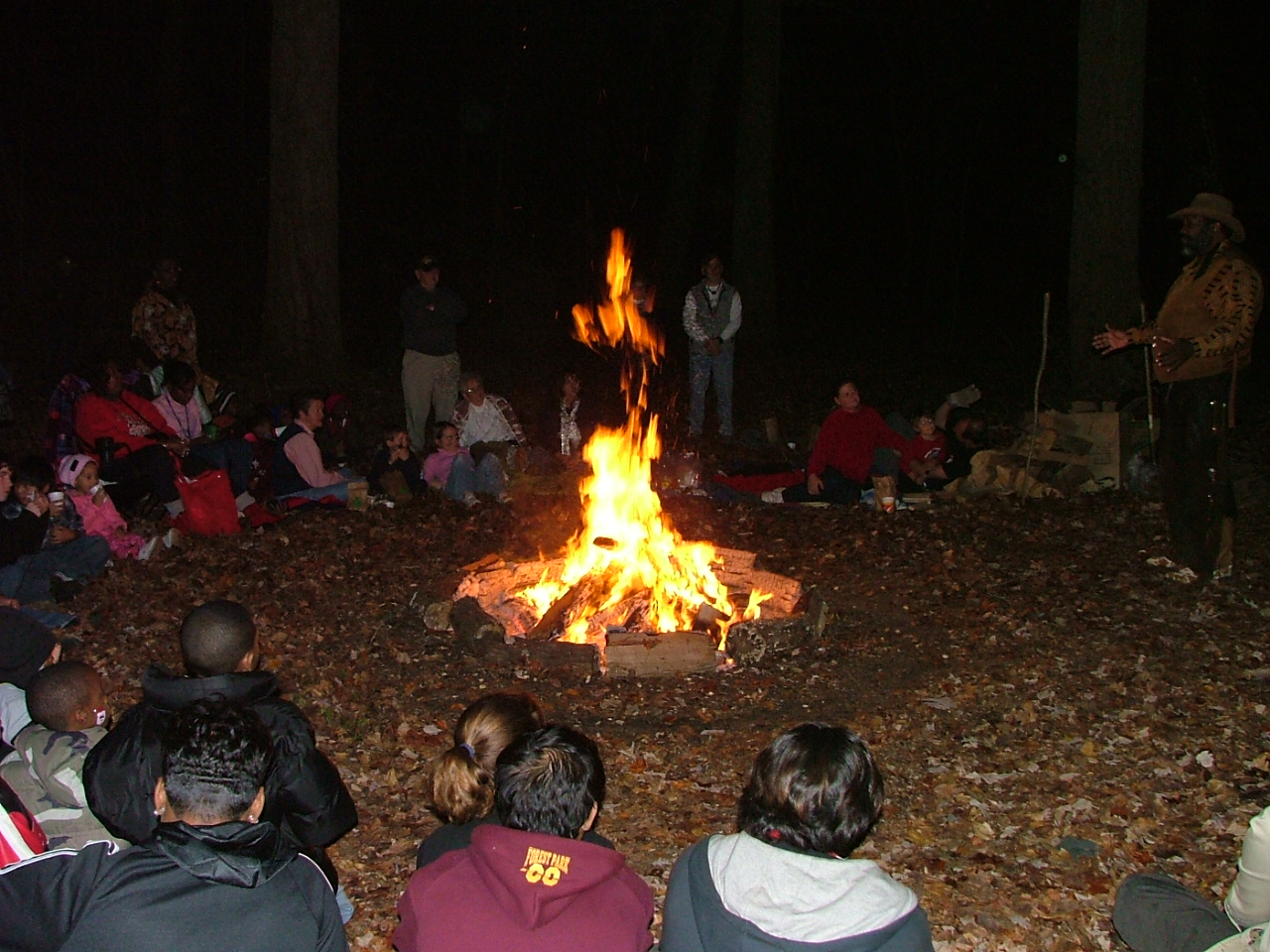
Yule log bonfire

The Reynolds Nature Preserve hosts an annual Yule Log every year on the second Friday night in December, centered in the Huie Barn. Live music is played at the amphitheater from local bands, with holiday stories by a campfire, and there is a children’s search for the Yule Log.

There is also an annual azalea festival.

== Bibliography ==
- 60 hikes within 60 miles: Atlanta Randy and Pam Golden, 2005 ISBN 0897326733
