= Fort Discovery =

Former children's science museum in Augusta, Georgia, USA

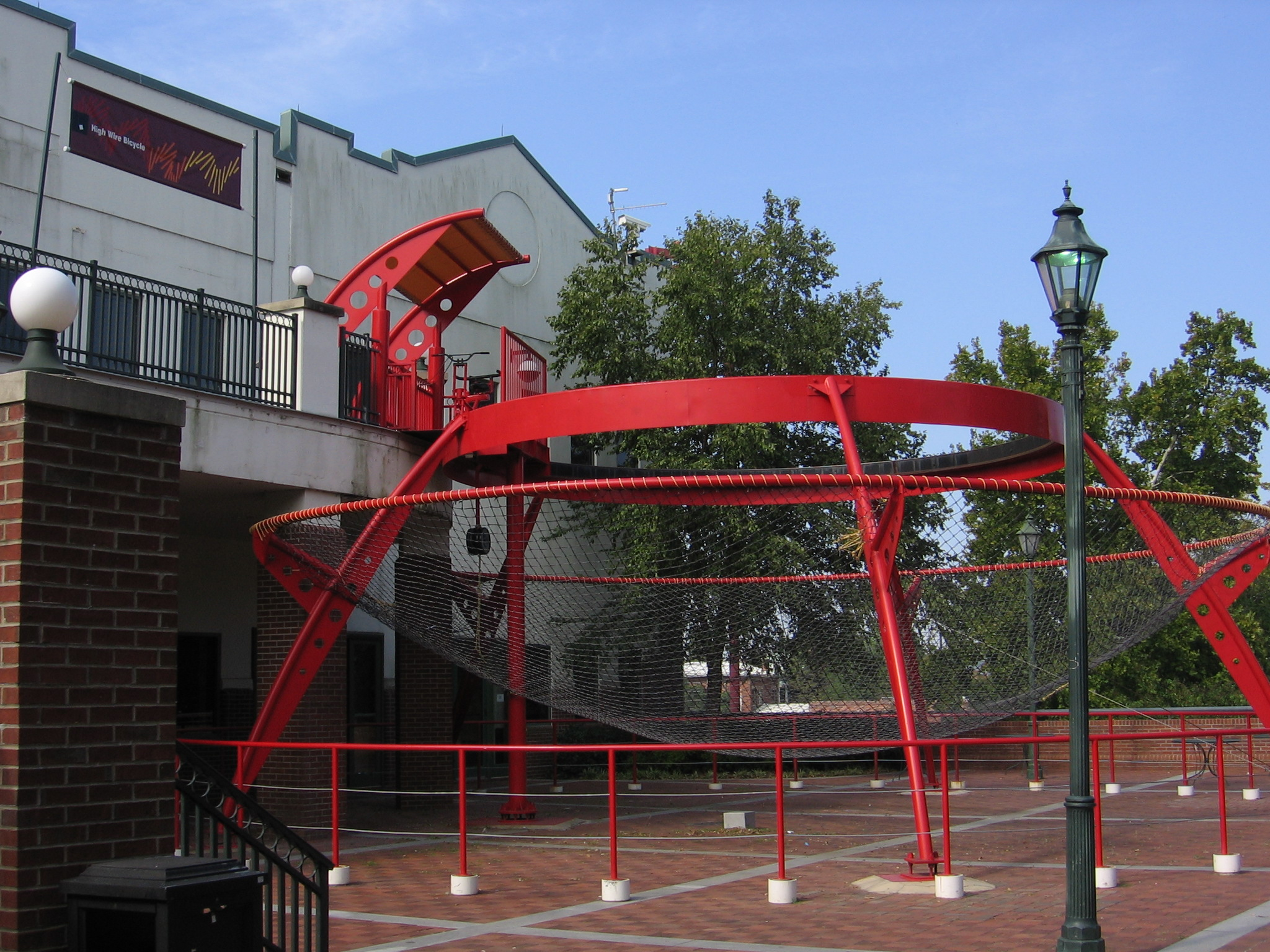
- Established: April 1997
- Dissolved: December 2010
- Location: 1 7th Street; Augusta, Georgia, United States
- Coordinates: 33.4768°N 81.9622°W
- Visitors: 200,000 (2007)
- Director: Rob Dennis

The National Science Center's Fort Discovery, generally known as Fort Discovery, was a 128,000-square-foot (11,900 m^{2}), children's science exhibition center and museum located in downtown Augusta, Georgia, at Riverwalk Augusta. The museum was located in the former Shoppes at Port Royal, which operated from 1991 to 1994.

Fort Discovery featured over 250 hands-on exhibits that demonstrated various scientific concepts. It featured several rides such as a high-wire bicycle, the human gyroscope, and space Moon walk, each demonstrating a fundamental concept of physics. The center opened in April 1997. In late 2003, the state cut off funds to the center and Fort Discovery was at danger of closing. In early 2004, the city and community funded Fort Discovery until January 2005, when the state started funding the center once more.

National Science Center relocated to Washington, D.C. after Fort Discovery closed permanently on December 31, 2010.

After Fort Discovery closed, Unisys purchased a portion of the building as its new center in Augusta.
