= Swamp Gravy =

Official folk-life play of Georgia, U.S.

Swamp Gravy is the U.S. state of Georgia's official folk-life play. It is performed each year In March and October in Colquitt, the Miller County seat in south Georgia.

== History ==
In 1990 Joy Jinks, a resident of Colquitt, met Richard Owen Geer by chance at a conference on community development in New York City. At that time Geer was a doctoral student in performance studies at Northwestern University. Jinks mentioned to Geer that her home community was in decline and that she and other members of Colquitt were considering making a play to celebrate the community's history. Geer explained to Jinks that his dissertation was research on how performance can be a community-building tool. He suggested that they work together to develop a play based on personal stories from the lives of Miller County residents.

About half a year after this encounter, Geer came to Colquitt and met with the Colquitt/Miller Arts Council. The project was called "Swamp Gravy," in honor of the soup made in southwest Georgia fishing camps comprising whatever vegetables are available, fried fish, a bit of fat, and whatever else might happen to be around.

Story gatherers from the county were charged with the task of recording stories from black and white members of the community. Once the stories were gathered, they were transcribed and put together in a script by Tennessee playwright Jo Carson.

Swamp Gravy Sketches was a musical first performed in the fall of 1992. It began as a one time event performed in the Miller County Elementary School auditorium to a sold out crowd. It received rave reviews and included an amateur cast of all local residents. During 1993, Swamp Gravy was performed over thirty times throughout Georgia. In 1994, the play earned a 1994 Cultural Olympiad Award in Atlanta.

The play moved to a new location, an old cotton warehouse transformed to a performance space, the Cotton Hall, Swamp Gravy Theater, in 1994. The hall has since become a state-of-the-art theater.

In 1996 the play was performed in Atlanta at the Olympic Games, and then at the Kennedy Center in Washington, DC.

Since then, it has grown into a seasonal run of thirty-two shows annually. A new show premieres each October with new stories from the town. Original music is added by local volunteers to complement the stories. As new stories are added, some old ones are replaced, and a new theme characterizes the new season's performances. In the early days the production stayed away from serious issues, but over the years difficult themes such as racism, spousal abuse and pedophilia have been broached. However the overall themes are still in celebration of life in rural America, such as work, religion, medicine, crime and punishment, local media, and marital and sibling relationships.

The cast consists of over 100 volunteers. Many cast members have been with the project throughout its life.

Swamp Gravy has become a national and international model for community theater. Delegates from Colquitt have traveled to nearly 15 states and several foreign nations in order to start other similar projects.

Swamp Gravy has paved the way for other shows at Cotton Hall Theater including professional productions, variety shows, and youth theater shows.

== Professional shows ==
December 3, 2003 saw the world premiere of Cotton Hall's first professional production, A Southern Christmas Carol with book, music and lyrics by Rob Lauer, who also directed the production. A Southern Christmas Carol was staged with a cast of ten professional actors, and received critical raves and was a box-office success. The theater staged it again in both 2004 and 2005.

During the three years that the show was produced at Cotton Hall, a number of professional actors were featured who have since had success on Broadway and in the music industry. Karen Beyer, who also choreographed Swamp Gravy and Christmas Carol, created the role of 'Missionary Lady' before going on to appear as a regular in the Lifetime Channel's series Army Wives.

In the summer of 2004, Rob Lauer directed CMAC's second professional production Smoke on the Mountain. The show featured Edmund Bagnell, who went on to star in the role of Toby opposite Judy Kaye in the first national tour of the 2005 Broadway revival of Sweeney Todd.

In the summer of 2005, Rob Lauer wrote, designed and directed a new dramatization of Huckleberry Finn with music by Peter Lewis, and starring Edmund Bagnell.

In 2006, after Lauer's departure as artistic director, Richard Geer, of Community Performance Inc. went on to direct two more professional productions Gospel of the Rock and Swamp Gravy Songbook. These plays were written by Jules Corriere.

Gospel of the Rock told the story of the Anglin brothers – two of the only men ever thought to have escaped Alcatraz Prison. In the play, Clarence and J.W. Anglin were good boys who just managed to find trouble. After escaping several smaller jails, and robbing an Alabama bank with a water gun, the brothers were sentenced to time in Alcatraz. Gospel of the Rock featured a cast of both locals and professional actors from Georgia and South Carolina. Three of the five cast members were Colquitt natives: a state patrolman, a farmer, and a teacher.

Swamp Gravy Songbook told a story of two families struggling to survive in a drought plagued area of farmland. The families, one black and one white, are forced to work together in order to live. This script was built around the catalog of songs written over the years from Swamp Gravy. The show featured mainly local actors.

In place of Southern Christmas Carol, December 2006 saw the premiere of Cotton Hall Christmas, another show written by Corriere. Cotton Hall Christmas followed a format similar to Swamp Gravy, putting stories from the community together to make the play.

== May-Haw ==
May-Haw, Colquitt's own variety show, showcases local musical talent as well as the humor of volunteer cast members. The production began in 2005 as a fundraiser for "Nuthin' But A Will", the 11th mural to be painted in town as a part of CMAC's Millennium Mural Project, and has since become a staple of the Cotton Hall season.

The show takes place in the studio of the WMHAW Radio Station, with hosts Floyd B. Loyd, Queezle Erskin, and Marvin Spitznargle. The motley trio grounds the show in a firm foundation of funny. They are assisted by a cast of volunteer comedians who tell their own jokes. Whereas Swamp Gravy generally boasts an audience of out-of-town visitors.

As of 2010, May-Haw has continued to fund portions of the Millennium Mural Project, as well as contributing to the Youth Theater and other projects. May-Haw consistently plays to sold out crowds, and is one of the Arts-Council's most successful shows. May-Haw is now performed twice a year, in April and January. The April performances are scheduled to coincide with the National Mayhaw Festival.

== CMAC Youth ==
The CMAC Youth Theater was begun in the summer of 2007. Its first production, Peter Pan, was directed by high school sophomore Will Murdock. The show boasted a cast of fifty volunteer actors ranging in age from five years old to adult. Since, the Youth Theater had produced Bridge to Terabithia, Willy Wonka, Christmastime at the Circus Marvello, and most recently Alice in Wonderland.

In 2008, Bridge to Terabithia was staged in the InterACT Building, a facility owned by the Arts-Council that was unused at the time. Curtains, stages, chairs, and lighting were added to the empty building to create the temporary theater. The show opened in February, just prior to the Spring season of Swamp Gravy.

Later that year, in June, Willy Wonka hit the stage. It was also directed by Murdock, with Susanne Reynolds and Preston Messer assisting. This show also had a large cast of more than fifty.

December ushered in a third youth theater show for 2008. Christmastime at the Circus Marvello was written for Cotton Hall by Will Murdock. Marvello told the journey of seven runaway orphans as they try to put together a "traditional old-fashioned Christmas". Along the way they are antagonized by a brooding and lonely widow, the police, and an unusually aggressive turkey.
