= Cobb County, Georgia =

County in Georgia, United States

- County
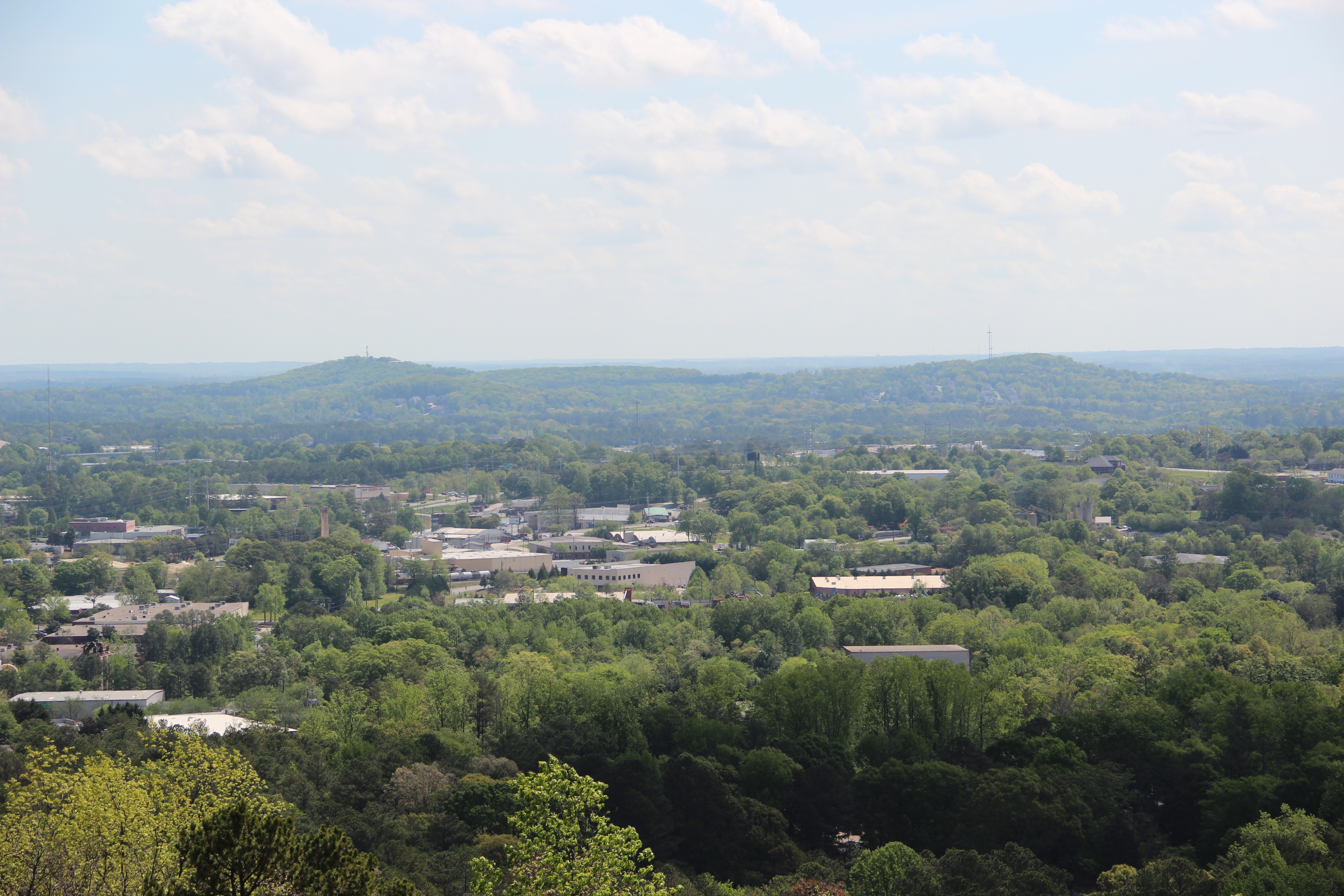
- From top: Blackjack Mountain

- Seal

- Location within the U.S. state of Georgia
- Coordinates: 33°56′N 84°35′W
- Country: United States
- State: Georgia
- Founded: December 2, 1832; 193 years ago
- Named for: Thomas W. Cobb
- Seat: Marietta
- Largest city: Mableton

Government
  - County manager: Jackie McMorris

Area
  - Total: 345 sq mi (890 km^{2})
  - Land: 340 sq mi (880 km^{2})
  - Water: 5.0 sq mi (13 km^{2}) 1.4%

Population (2020)
  - Total: 766,149
  - Estimate (2025): 793,345 ▲
  - Density: 2,300/sq mi (870/km^{2})
- Time zone: UTC−5 (Eastern)
  - Summer (DST): UTC−4 (EDT)
- Congressional districts: 6th, 11th, 14th
- Website: cobbcounty.org

Cobb County is in the U.S. state of Georgia, and is a core county of the Atlanta metropolitan area in the north-central portion of the state. As of the 2020 Census, the population was 766,149. It is the state's third most populous county, after Fulton and Gwinnett counties. Its county seat is Marietta; its largest city is Mableton.

Along with several adjoining counties, Cobb County was established on December 3, 1832, by the Georgia General Assembly from the large Cherokee County territory—land northwest of the Chattahoochee River which the state acquired from the Cherokee Nation and redistributed to settlers via lottery, following the passage of the federal Indian Removal Act. The county was named for Thomas Willis Cobb, a U.S. representative and senator from Georgia. It is believed that Marietta was named for his wife, Mary. Cobb County is included in the Atlanta metropolitan area and is situated immediately to the northwest of Atlanta's city limits. Its Cumberland District, an edge city, has over 24 million square feet (2,200,000 m^{2}) of office space. Major League Baseball's Atlanta Braves have played home games at Truist Park in Cumberland since 2017.

In 2003, the U.S. Census Bureau ranked Cobb County as the most educated in the state of Georgia and 12th-most in the United States. It has ranked among the top 100 highest-income counties in the United States. In October 2017, Cobb was ranked as the "Least Obese County in Georgia". Cobb County is one of the fastest growing counties in Georgia according to the 2020 US Census.

== History ==
Cobb County was one of nine Georgia counties carved out of the disputed territory of the Cherokee Nation in 1832. It was the 81st county in Georgia and named for Judge Thomas Willis Cobb, who served as a U.S. Senator, state representative, and superior court judge. It is believed that the county seat of Marietta was named for Judge Cobb's wife, Mary. The state started acquiring right-of-way for the Western & Atlantic Railroad in 1836. A train began running between Marietta and Marthasville (modern-day Atlanta) in 1845.

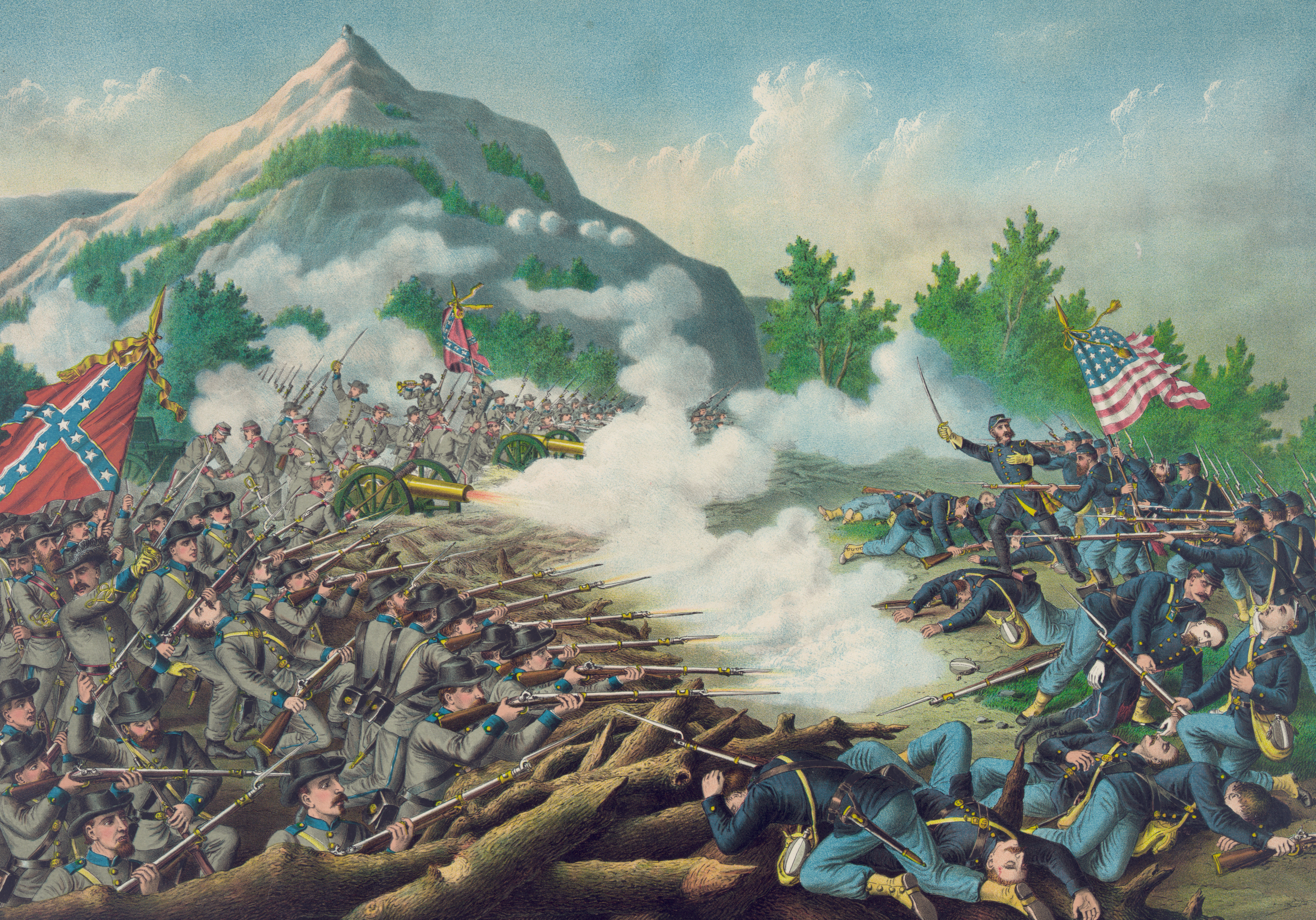
The Battle of Kennesaw Mountain, which was fought in Cobb County

During the American Civil War, some Confederate troops were trained at a camp in Big Shanty (now Kennesaw), where the Andrews Raid occurred, starting the Great Locomotive Chase. There were battles of New Hope Church May 25, 1864, Pickett's Mill May 27, and Dallas May 28. These were followed by the prolonged series of battles through most of June 1864 until very early July: the Battle of Marietta and the Battle of Noonday Creek. The Battle of Allatoona Pass on October 5, 1864, occurred as Sherman was starting his march through Georgia. Union forces burnt most houses and confiscated or burnt crops. The Battle of Kennesaw Mountain on June 27, 1864, was the site of the only major Confederate victory in General William T. Sherman's invasion of Georgia. Despite the victory, Union forces outflanked the Confederates. In 1915, Leo Frank, the Jewish supervisor of an Atlanta pencil factory who was convicted of murdering one of his workers, thirteen-year-old Mary Phagan, was kidnapped from his jail cell and brought to Frey's Gin, two miles (3.2 km) east of Marietta, where he was lynched.

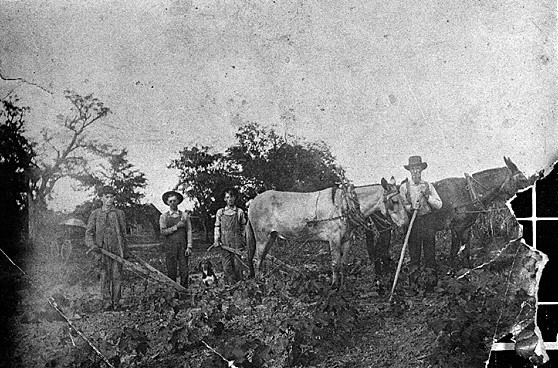
Cotton workers in Mableton, around 1900

Cotton farming in the area peaked from the 1890s through the 1920s. Low prices during the Great Depression resulted in the cessation of cotton farming throughout Cobb County. The price of cotton went from 16¢ per pound (35¢/kg) in 1920 to 9½¢ (21¢/kg) in 1930. This resulted in a cotton bust for the county, which had stopped growing the product but was milling it. This bust was followed by the Great Depression. To help combat the bust, the state started work on a road in 1922 that would later become U.S. 41, later replaced by Cobb Parkway in the late 1940s and early 1950s.

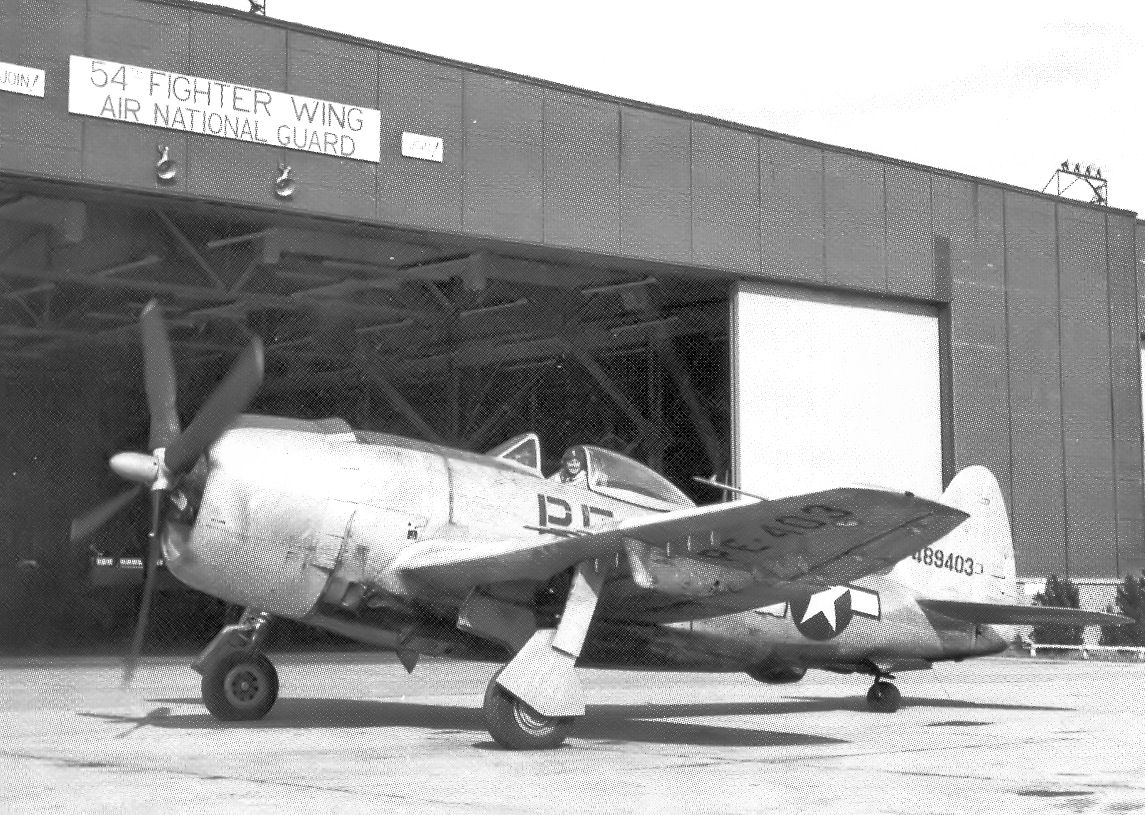
F-47 Thunderbolt – 128th Fighter Squadron – Marietta Army Airfield, 1946

In 1942, Bell Aircraft opened a Marietta plant to manufacture B-29 bombers and Marietta Army Airfield was founded. Both were closed after World War II but reopened during the Korean War when the Air Force acquired the airfield, renamed Dobbins AFB, and the plant by Lockheed. During the Korean and Vietnam Wars, Lockheed Marietta was the leading manufacturer of military transport planes, including the C-130 Hercules and the C-5 Galaxy. "In Cobb County and other sprawling Cold War suburbs from Orange County to Norfolk/Hampton Roads, the direct link between federal defense spending and local economic prosperity structured a bipartisan political culture of hawkish conservatism and material self-interest on issues of national security." When county home rule was enacted statewide by amendment to the Georgia state constitution in the early 1960s, Ernest W. Barrett became the first chairman of the new county commission. The county courthouse, built in 1888, was demolished, spurring a law that now prevents counties from doing so without a referendum. In the 1960s and 1970s, Cobb transformed from rural to suburban, as integration spurred white flight from the city of Atlanta, which by 1970 was majority-African-American. Real-estate booms drew rural white southerners and Rust Belt transplants, both groups mostly first-generation white-collar workers. Cobb County was the home of former segregationist and Georgia governor Lester Maddox (1966–71). In 1975, Cobb voters elected John Birch Society leader Larry McDonald to Congress, running in opposition to desegregation busing. A conservative Democrat, McDonald called for investigations into alleged plots by the Rockefellers and the Soviet Union to impose "socialist-one-world-government" and co-founded the Western Goals Foundation. In 1983, McDonald died aboard Korean Air Lines Flight 007, shot down by a Soviet fighter jet over restricted airspace. I-75 through the county is now named for him.

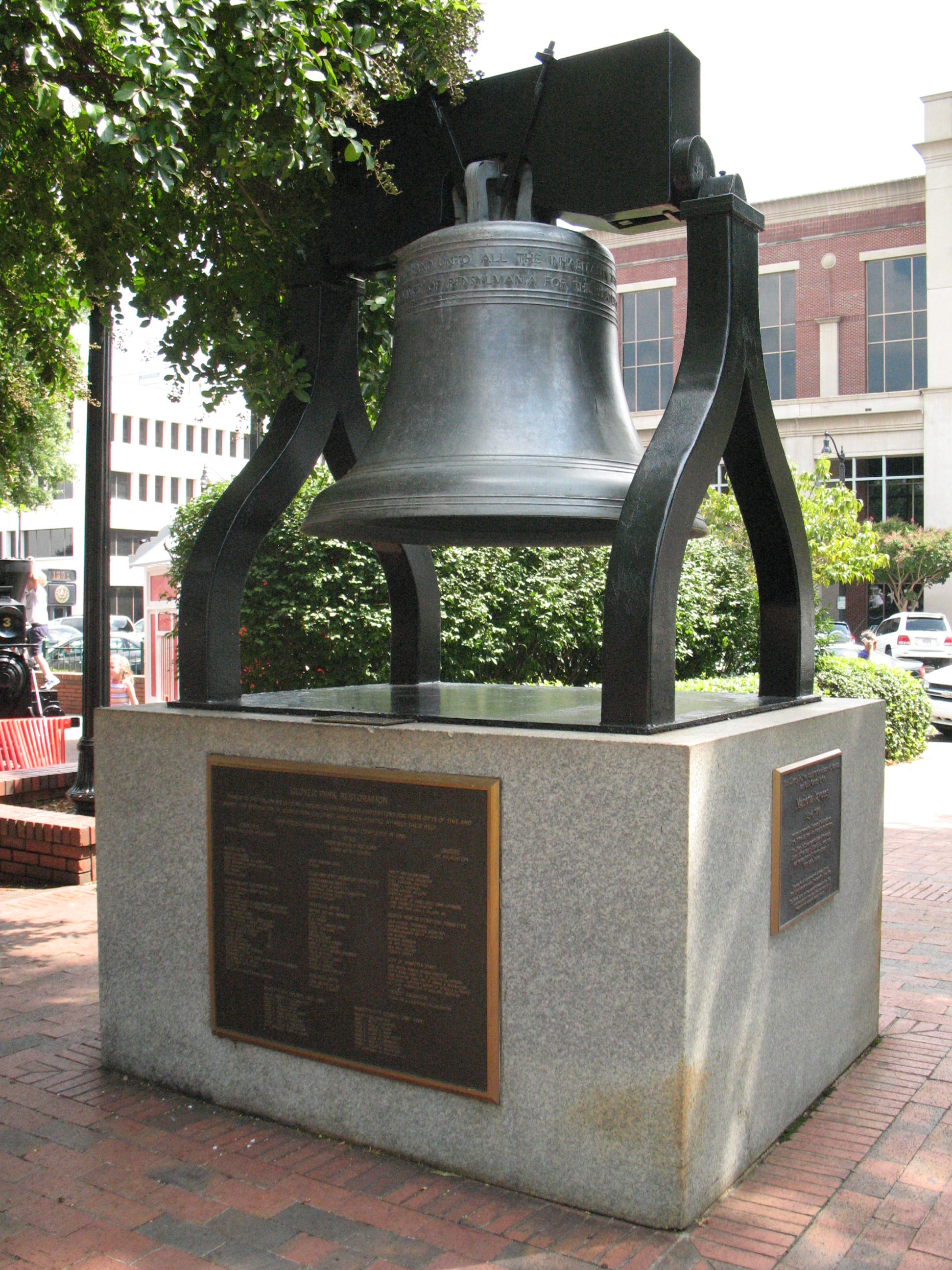
Glover Park Bell, on the square in Marietta

In 1990, Republican Congressmen Newt Gingrich became Representative of a new district centered around Cobb County. In 1994, as Republicans took control of the U.S. House of Representatives for the first time in almost fifty years, Gingrich became Speaker of the House, thrusting Cobb County into the national spotlight.

In 1993, county commissioners passed a resolution condemning homosexuality and cutting off funding for the arts after complaints about a community theater. After protests from gay rights organizations, organizers of the 1996 Summer Olympics pulled events out of Cobb County, including the Olympic Torch Relay. The county's inns were nevertheless filled at 100% of capacity for two months during the event.

In the 1990s and 2000s, Cobb's demographics changed. As Atlanta's gentrification reversed decades of white flight, middle-class African-Americans and Russian, Bosnian, Chinese, Indian, Brazilian, Mexican, and Central American immigrants moved to older suburbs in south and southwest Cobb. In 2010, African-American Democrat David Scott was elected to Georgia's 13th congressional district, which included many of those suburbs. Cobb became the first Georgia county to participate in the Immigration and Nationality Act Section 287(g) enabling local law officers to enforce immigration law.

== Geography ==
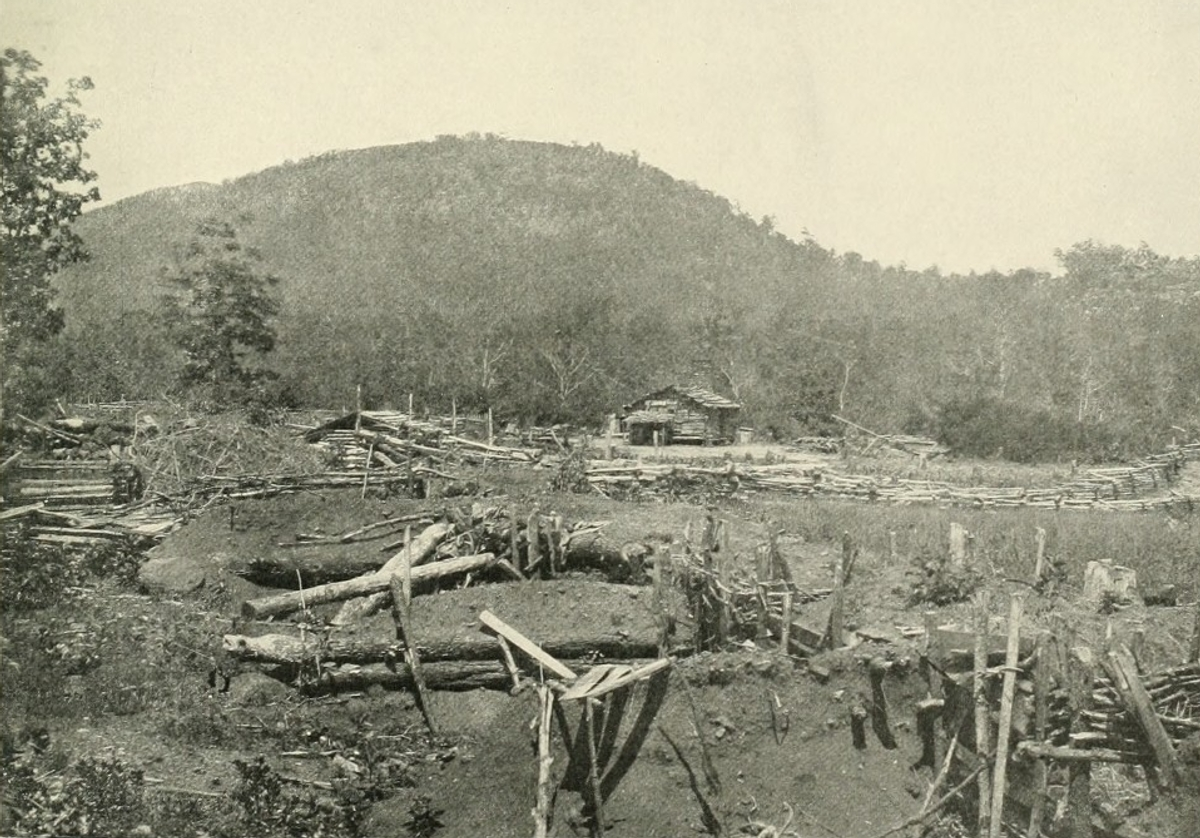
Union trenches at Kennesaw Mountain, 1864

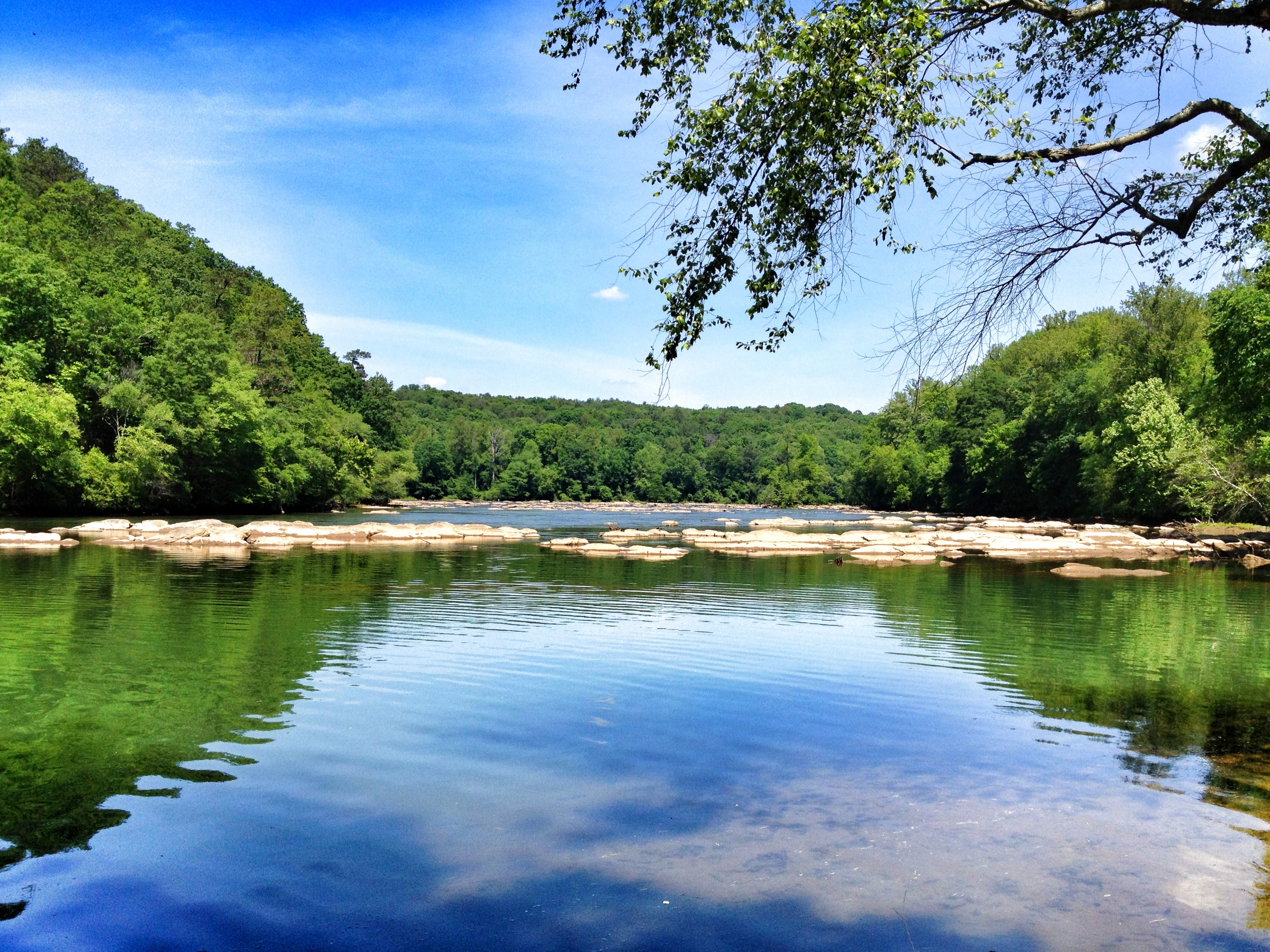
Chattahoochee River National Recreation Area

According to the U.S. Census Bureau, the county has a total area of 345 square miles (890 km^{2}), of which 340 square miles (880 km^{2}) is land and 4.0 square miles (10 km^{2}) (1.4%) is water. The county is located in the upper Piedmont region of the state, with a few mountains located within the county, considered to be part of the southernmost extensions of the Appalachian Mountains.

The county is divided between two major basins. Most runoff flows into the Middle Chattahoochee-Lake Harding and Upper Chattahoochee River sub-basins of the ACF River Basin (Apalachicola-Chattahoochee-Flint River Basin) along the southeastern border, directly via Willeo Creek, Sope Creek (Sewell Creek), Rottenwood Creek (Powers Creek, Poorhouse Creek, Poplar Creek), Nickajack Creek and others. The large Sweetwater Creek is the other major stream, carrying the waters of Noses Creek (Ward Creek, Olley Creek, Mud Creek), Powder Springs Creek (Rakestraw Creek, Mill Creek) and others into the Chattahoochee. A ridge from Lost Mountain in the west, to Kennesaw Mountain in the north-central, to Sweat Mountain in the extreme northeast, divides the far north-northwest of the county into the Etowah River sub-basin of the ACT River Basin (Coosa-Tallapoosa River Basin), which includes Lake Allatoona. Noonday Creek (Little Noonday Creek) flows northward into the lake, as does Allatoona Creek, which forms a major arm of the lake. Proctor Creek forms the much older Lake Acworth, which in turn empties directly into Lake Allatoona under the Lake Acworth Drive (Georgia 92) bridge. North Cobb is in the Coosa River basin.

There are several high points in Cobb County.

- Sweat Mountain: in the extreme northeast portion, runs along the border with Cherokee County, and is the metro area's major antenna farm
- Blackjack Mountain: a low ridge between central and east Cobb
- Kennesaw Mountain: the highest point in the county and the entire suburban area of metro Atlanta, located in the north-northwest between Kennesaw and Marietta
- Little Kennesaw Mountain: an offshoot of Kennesaw
- Lost Mountain: in western Cobb
- Pine Mountain: west-northwest of Kennesaw Mountain, between Kennesaw and Due West
- Brushy Mountain: near Kennesaw Mountain, just southeast of Barrett Parkway at Cobb Parkway
- Vinings Mountain or Mount Wilkinson: overlooks the town of Vinings

=== Adjacent counties ===
Metro Atlanta

- Cherokee County – north
- Fulton County – east, northeast, southeast
- Douglas County – southwest
- Paulding County – west
- Bartow County – northwest

=== Addressing ===
Despite the lack of a grid system of city blocks though the county, all street addresses have their numeric origin at the southwest corner of the town square in Marietta.

=== Geocodes and the world's largest toll-free calling area ===
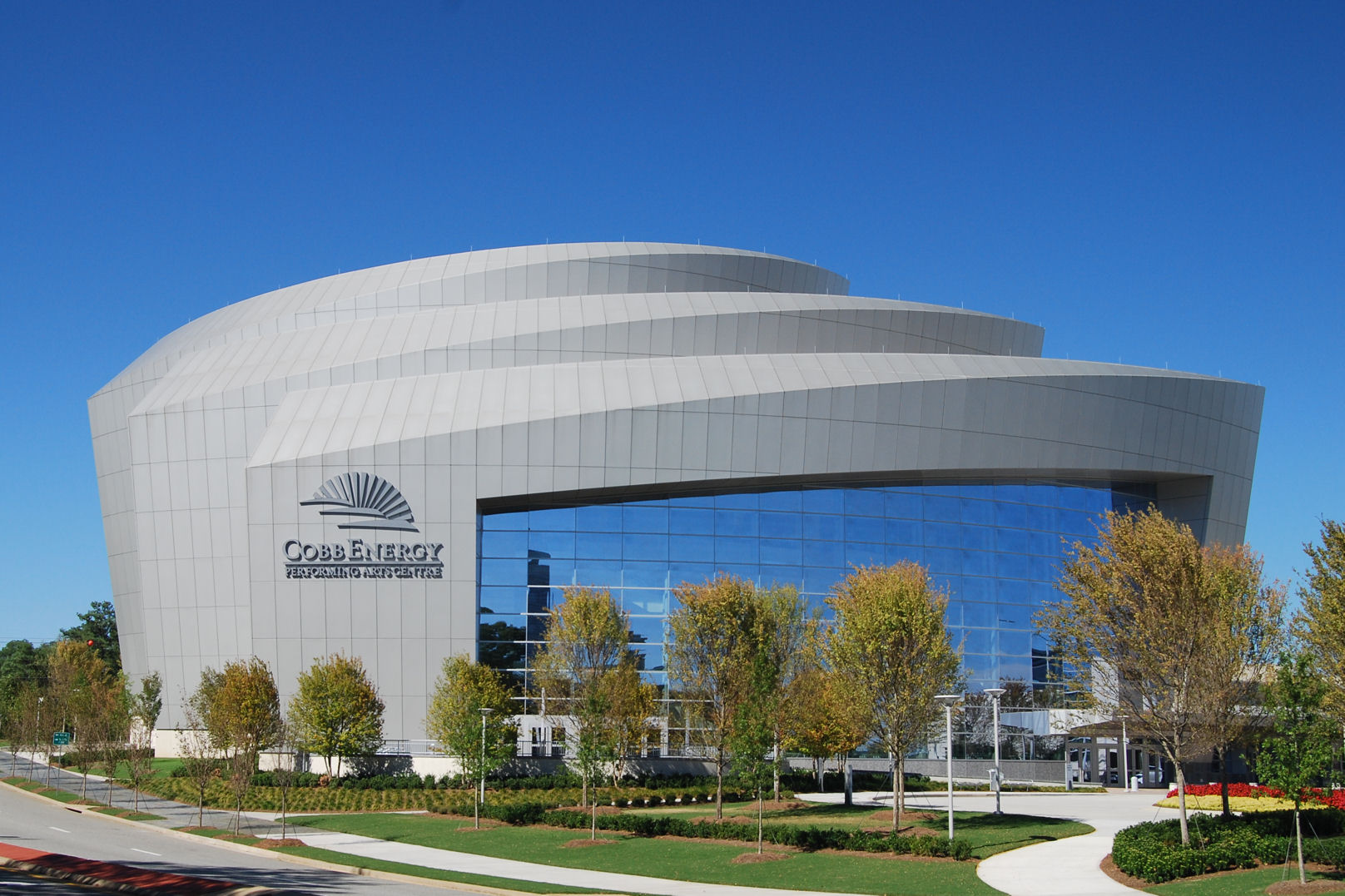
Cobb Energy Performing Arts Center

Originally in area code 404, the county was moved into area code 770 in 1995, and overlaid by area code 678 in 1998. Before 1995, those with phones tied to the Woodstock telephone exchange (prefixes 924, 926, 928, later 516 and 591) could also call the Canton exchange (479, later 445, then 704) as a local call. This became moot, along with other dual-zone exchanges in metro Atlanta, when the exurban exchanges (including Canton) were fully made a part of what was already the world's largest toll-free calling zone. It is a zone spanning 7,162 square miles (18,549 km^{2}), with four active telephone area codes, and local calling extending into portions of two others.

Cobb's FIPS county code is 13067. Because the National Weather Service has not subdivided the county, its WRSAME code is 013067, for receiving targeted weather warnings from NOAA Weather Radio. The county is primarily within the broadcast range of one weather radio station: KEC80, on 162.550 MHz, transmitted to all of metro Atlanta and broadcast from NWSFO Peachtree City. The secondary station is the much newer WWH23 on 162.425 from Buchanan, which also transmits warnings for Cobb but has reception mainly in the western part of the county.

== Demographics ==
Historical population
Census	Pop.	Note	%±
1840	7,539		—
1850	13,843		83.6%
1860	14,242		2.9%
1870	13,814		−3.0%
1880	20,748		50.2%
1890	22,286		7.4%
1900	24,664		10.7%
1910	28,397		15.1%
1920	30,437		7.2%
1930	35,408		16.3%
1940	38,272		8.1%
1950	61,830		61.6%
1960	114,174		84.7%
1970	196,793		72.4%
1980	297,718		51.3%
1990	447,745		50.4%
2000	607,751		35.7%
2010	688,078		13.2%
2020	766,149		11.3%
2025 (est.)	793,345	▲	3.5%
U.S. Decennial Census; 1790-1880 1890-1910; 1920-1930 1930-1940; 1940-1950 1960-1980; 1980-2000 2010 2020

=== Racial and ethnic composition ===
Cobb County, Georgia – Racial and ethnic composition Note: the US Census treats Hispanic/Latino as an ethnic category. This table excludes Latinos from the racial categories and assigns them to a separate category. Hispanics/Latinos may be of any race.
Race / Ethnicity (NH = Non-Hispanic)	Pop 1980	Pop 1990	Pop 2000	Pop 2010	Pop 2020	% 1980	% 1990	% 2000	% 2010	% 2020
White alone (NH)	279,308	385,831	417,947	387,438	369,182	93.82%	86.17%	68.77%	56.31%	48.19%
Black or African American alone (NH)	12,947	43,655	112,924	168,053	200,072	4.35%	9.75%	18.58%	24.42%	26.11%
Native American or Alaska Native alone (NH)	439	909	1,156	1,332	1,289	0.15%	0.20%	0.19%	0.19%	0.17%
Asian alone (NH)	1,666	7,775	18,417	30,432	42,533	0.56%	1.74%	3.03%	4.42%	5.55%
Native Hawaiian or Pacific Islander alone (NH)	x	x	192	267	293	x	x	0.03%	0.04%	0.04%
Other race alone (NH)	518	172	1,706	2,961	7,382	0.17%	0.04%	0.28%	0.43%	0.96%
Mixed race or Multiracial (NH)	x	x	8,445	13,265	34,158	x	x	1.39%	1.93%	4.46%
Hispanic or Latino (any race)	2,840	9,403	46,964	84,330	111,240	0.95%	2.10%	7.73%	12.26%	14.52%
Total	297,718	447,745	607,751	688,078	766,149	100.00%	100.00%	100.00%	100.00%	100.00%

=== 2020 census ===
As of the 2020 census, there were 766,149 people, 291,639 households, and 191,533 families residing in the county.

Of the residents, 22.8% were under the age of 18 and 13.2% were 65 years of age or older; the median age was 37.0 years. For every 100 females there were 93.1 males, and for every 100 females age 18 and over there were 90.3 males. 100.0% of residents lived in urban areas and 0.0% lived in rural areas.

The racial makeup of the county was 50.6% White, 26.6% Black or African American, 0.6% American Indian and Alaska Native, 5.6% Asian, 0.1% Native Hawaiian and Pacific Islander, 7.1% from some other race, and 9.5% from two or more races. Hispanic or Latino residents of any race comprised 14.5% of the population.

There were 291,639 households in the county, of which 32.8% had children under the age of 18 living with them and 28.8% had a female householder with no spouse or partner present. About 26.0% of all households were made up of individuals and 7.9% had someone living alone who was 65 years of age or older.

There were 308,504 housing units, of which 5.5% were vacant. Among occupied housing units, 64.3% were owner-occupied and 35.7% were renter-occupied. The homeowner vacancy rate was 1.5% and the rental vacancy rate was 8.1%.

=== 2010 Census ===
As of the 2010 United States census, there were 688,078 people, 260,056 households, and 175,357 families residing in the county. The population density was 2,026.4 inhabitants per square mile (782.4/km^{2}). There were 286,490 housing units at an average density of 843.7 per square mile (325.8/km^{2}). The racial makeup of the county was 62.21% white, 24.96% black or African American, 4.46% Asian, 0.34% American Indian, 0.1% Pacific Islander, 5.28% from other races, and 2.71% from two or more races. Those of Hispanic or Latino origin made up 12.26% of the population. Regarding specific ethnic origins, 10.4% cited German, 10.0% English, 9.3% Irish, and 8.6% American ancestry.

Of the 260,056 households, 36.7% had children under the age of 18 living with them, 50.2% were married couples living together, 13.0% had a female householder with no husband present, 32.6% were non-families, and 25.6% of all households were made up of individuals. The average household size was 2.61 and the average family size was 3.17. The median age was 35.4 years.

The median income for a household in the county was $65,522 and the median income for a family was $78,920. Males had a median income of $55,200 versus $43,367 for females. The per capita income for the county was $33,110. About 7.6% of families and 10.6% of the population were below the poverty line, including 14.5% of those under age 18 and 7.2% of those age 65 or over.

=== 2000 Census ===
As of 2000, there were 697,553 people, 248,303 households, and 169,178 families residing in the county. The population density was 1,998 inhabitants per square mile (771/km^{2}). There were 261,659 housing units at an average density of 770 per square mile (300/km^{2}). The racial makeup of the county in 2000 was 72.4% White, 18.8% Black, 0.3% Native American, 3.06% Asian, 0.0% Pacific Islander, 5.3% from other races, and 1.87% from two or more races. 7.73% of the population was Hispanic or Latino of any race.

There were 248,303 households, out of which 35.80% had children under the age of 18 living with them, 54.30% were married couples living together, 10.70% had a female householder with no husband present, and 31.20% were non-families. 23.20% of all households were made up of individuals, and 4.10% had someone living alone who was 65 years of age or older. The average household size was 2.71 and the average family size was 3.25.

In the county, 26.10% of the population was under the age of 18, 9.00% from 18 to 24, 36.50% from 25 to 44, 21.50% from 45 to 64, and 6.90% was 65 years of age or older. The median age was 33 years. For every 100 females, there were 98.50 males. For every 100 females age 18 and over, there were 95.90 males.

As of 2007, the median income was $70,472. The per capita income for the county was $32,740. About 6.0% of families and 9.4% of the population were below the poverty line, including 9.1% of those under age 18 and 7.8% of those age 65 or over.

== Education ==
=== Public schools ===
School districts include:

- Cobb County School District (serves all county locations except the city of Marietta)
- Marietta City Schools (serves the city of Marietta locations)

=== Private schools ===
- Cumberland Christian Academy, Austell (K–12)
- Dominion Christian School, Marietta (middle school–12)
- Midway Covenant Christian School, Powder Springs (preK–12)
- Mount Paran Christian School, Kennesaw (preK–12)
- North Cobb Christian School, Kennesaw (K–12)
- The Walker School, Marietta (preK–12)
- Whitefield Academy, Mableton (preK–12)
- East Cobb Christian School, Marietta (K–8)

=== Colleges and universities ===
- Chattahoochee Technical College
- Kennesaw State University
- Life University

=== Libraries ===
Cobb County maintains the Cobb County Public Library System. The libraries provide resources such as books, videos, internet access, printing, and computer classes. The libraries in the CCPLS are:

- East Cobb Library
- Gritters Library
- Kemp Memorial Library
- Lewis A. Ray Library
- Mountain View Regional Library
- North Cobb Regional Library
- Powder Springs Library
- Sewell Mill Library
- Sibley Library
- South Cobb Regional Library
- Stratton Library
- Sweetwater Valley Library
- Switzer Library
- Vinings Library
- West Cobb Regional Library
- Bookmobile

The Smyrna Public Library is a city-owned library in Smyrna and is not part of the county system.

== Government and elections ==
Under Georgia's home rule provision, county governments have free rein to legislate on all matters within the county, provided that such legislation does not conflict with state or federal laws or constitutions.

Cobb County is governed by a five-member board of commissioners, which has both legislative and executive authority within the county. The chairman of the board is elected county-wide. The other four commissioners are elected from single-member districts. The board hires a county manager who oversees the day-to-day operations of the county's executive departments.

=== Cobb County Board of Commissioners ===
District	Name	Party	First elected	Region Represented
At-Large (chair)	Lisa Cupid	Democratic	2020	All
1	Keli Gambrill	Republican	2018	Northwest Cobb
2	Erick Allen	Democratic	2025	Southeast Cobb
3	JoAnn Birrell	Republican	2010	Northeast Cobb
4	Monique Sheffield	Democratic	2020	Southwest Cobb

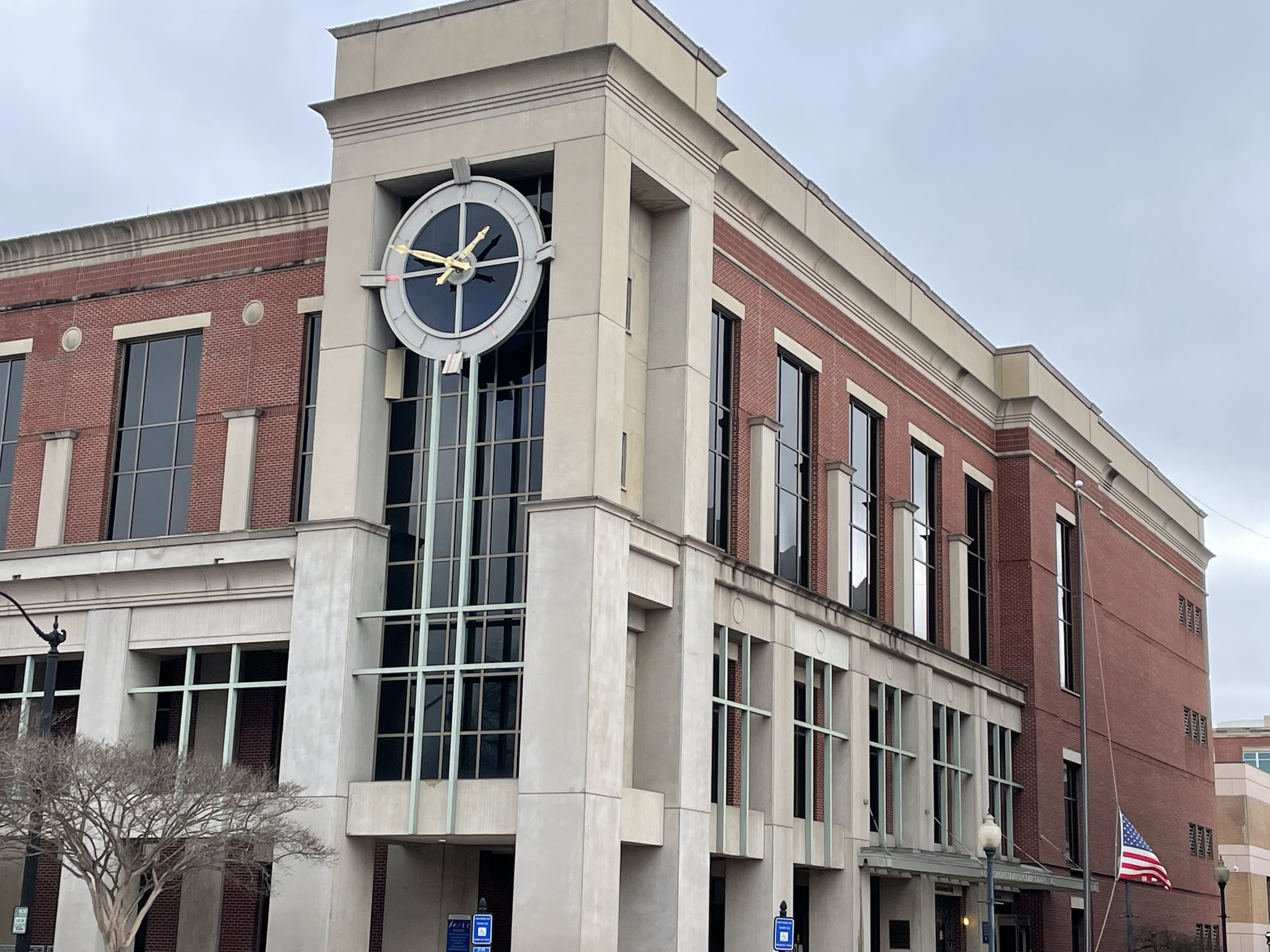
Cobb County Government Building

County residents also elect a sheriff, district attorney, probate court judge, clerk of the superior court, clerk of the state court, state court solicitor, chief magistrate judge (who then appoints other magistrate court judges), superior court judges, state court judges, tax commissioner, surveyor, and a seven-member board of education. Democrats hold every partisan office elected countywide as well as a (3-2) voting majority on the county commission. In addition to the county sheriff, the constitutional chief law enforcement officer of the county, Cobb County has a separate police department under the authority of the Board of Commissioners. The sheriff oversees the jail, to which everyone arrested under state law is taken, regardless of the city or other area of the county where it happens, or which police department makes the arrest.

With the exception of Mableton, each city has a separate police department, answerable to its governing council. Marietta, Smyrna, and Austell have separate fire departments, with the Cobb County Fire Department being the authority having jurisdiction over Kennesaw, Acworth, Powder Springs, Mableton and unincorporated areas. Cobb 911 covers unincorporated areas and the city of Marietta. Kennesaw and Acworth jointly operate a small 911 call center (PSAP) upstairs in Kennesaw city hall, dispatching the police departments in both cities, and forwarding fire calls to Cobb. Smyrna operates a separate PSAP while offering dispatch services to the city of Powder Springs. Austell operates its own separate 911 system.

The county retails potable water to much of the county and wholesales it to various cities.

The current County Manager is Jackie R. McMorris.

== Politics ==
From 1964 until 2012, the county was a Republican stronghold in presidential elections. The only time during this period that the county supported a Democrat was in 1976 when native son Jimmy Carter swept every county in the state. Before 1960, it was a "Solid South" Democratic county, except when Warren G. Harding came close to carrying it in 1920, and when Herbert Hoover won it by nine points due to anti-Catholic voting against Al Smith in 1928.

In the late 20th century, the county developed a reputation as a conservative stronghold. However, due to rapid racial and ethnic demographic changes since the 1990s, along with population growth coming from blue northern states, the county has increasingly supported the Democratic Party. In 2016, Hillary Clinton became the first Democrat to win Cobb County since Jimmy Carter in 1976, and the first non-Georgian Democrat since John F. Kennedy in 1960. The county then supported Joe Biden in 2020 by 14 points–the best showing for a Democrat since Kennedy in 1960. This was crucial to Biden winning the state for the Democrats for the first time since 1992.

In 2018, Stacey Abrams became the first Democrat to win Cobb County in a gubernatorial election since 1986, when Joe Frank Harris swept every county statewide.

United States presidential election results for Cobb County, Georgia
Year	Republican		Democratic		Third party(ies)	
Year	No.	%	No.	%	No.	%
1880	559	22.02%	1,980	77.98%	0	0.00%
1884	536	28.09%	1,372	71.91%	0	0.00%
1888	391	25.03%	1,143	73.18%	28	1.79%
1892	564	19.63%	1,794	62.44%	515	17.93%
1896	758	33.87%	1,387	61.97%	93	4.16%
1900	311	19.73%	1,156	73.35%	109	6.92%
1904	220	12.85%	1,171	68.40%	321	18.75%
1908	548	33.62%	889	54.54%	193	11.84%
1912	307	18.35%	1,329	79.44%	37	2.21%
1916	434	18.70%	1,750	75.40%	137	5.90%
1920	1,095	47.55%	1,208	52.45%	0	0.00%
1924	362	18.95%	1,360	71.20%	188	9.84%
1928	1,711	54.54%	1,426	45.46%	0	0.00%
1932	218	6.56%	3,079	92.71%	24	0.72%
1936	707	20.11%	2,802	79.72%	6	0.17%
1940	992	18.21%	4,447	81.63%	9	0.17%
1944	1,349	21.25%	5,000	78.75%	0	0.00%
1948	1,524	21.47%	4,766	67.15%	808	11.38%
1952	4,163	29.02%	10,182	70.98%	0	0.00%
1956	6,798	36.76%	11,696	63.24%	0	0.00%
1960	8,240	38.97%	12,906	61.03%	0	0.00%
1964	20,863	55.62%	16,647	44.38%	1	0.00%
1968	18,649	41.25%	8,755	19.37%	17,805	39.38%
1972	43,977	85.12%	7,688	14.88%	0	0.00%
1976	34,324	43.27%	45,002	56.73%	0	0.00%
1980	51,977	54.25%	39,157	40.87%	4,682	4.89%
1984	97,429	77.42%	28,414	22.58%	0	0.00%
1988	106,621	72.70%	39,297	26.79%	740	0.50%
1992	103,734	52.62%	63,960	32.45%	29,437	14.93%
1996	114,188	56.93%	73,750	36.77%	12,635	6.30%
2000	140,494	59.78%	86,676	36.88%	7,857	3.34%
2004	173,467	61.94%	103,955	37.12%	2,639	0.94%
2008	170,957	54.08%	141,216	44.67%	3,951	1.25%
2012	171,722	55.25%	133,124	42.83%	5,989	1.93%
2016	152,912	45.77%	160,121	47.93%	21,025	6.29%
2020	165,436	41.99%	221,847	56.30%	6,739	1.71%
2024	168,679	42.03%	228,404	56.91%	4,286	1.07%

United States Senate election results for Cobb County, Georgia2
Year	Republican		Democratic		Third party(ies)	
Year	No.	%	No.	%	No.	%
2020	169,658	43.42%	210,851	53.96%	10,263	2.63%
2020	157,653	43.96%	201,009	56.04%	0	0.00%

United States Senate election results for Cobb County, Georgia3
Year	Republican		Democratic		Third party(ies)	
Year	No.	%	No.	%	No.	%
2020	98,534	25.33%	146,081	37.56%	144,351	37.11%
2020	154,714	43.15%	203,876	56.85%	0	0.00%
2022	125,795	40.49%	176,385	56.78%	8,472	2.73%
2022	112,920	40.43%	166,346	59.57%	0	0.00%

Georgia Gubernatorial election results for Cobb County
Year	Republican		Democratic		Third party(ies)	
Year	No.	%	No.	%	No.	%
2022	147,698	47.31%	161,872	51.85%	2,645	0.85%

Cobb County is one of six "reverse pivot counties", counties that voted Republican in 2008 and 2012 before voting Democratic in 2016 onward. It is also one of nine counties that shifted more than 25 percentage points to the left from 2012 to 2024.

=== Georgia General Assembly ===
==== Georgia State Senate ====
District	Name	Party	First Elected	Area(s) of Cobb County represented
28	Donzella James	Democratic	2019	Areas with Atlanta post office addresses, parts of South Cobb
32	Kay Kirkpatrick	Republican	2017	Marietta
33	Michael "Doc" Rhett	Democratic	2015	Marietta
35	Jason Esteves	Democratic	2023	Smyrna
37	Ed Setzler	Republican	2023	Roswell
56	John Albers	Republican	2011	Roswell

==== Georgia House of Representatives ====
District	Name	Party	First Elected	Area(s) of Cobb County represented
19	Joseph Gullett	Republican	2019	Dallas
22	Jordan Ridley	Republican	2023	Marietta
34	Devan Seabaugh	Republican	2021	Marietta
35	Lisa Campbell	Democratic	2023	Kennesaw
36	Ginny Ehrhart	Republican	2019	Marietta
37	Mary Frances Williams	Democratic	2019	Roswell
38	David Wilkerson	Democratic	2011	Powder Springs
39	Terry Cummings	Democratic	2023	Mableton
41	Michael Smith	Democratic	2013	Marietta
42	Gabriel Sanchez	Democratic	2025	Smyrna
43	Solomon Adesanya	Democratic	2023	Marietta
44	Don Parsons	Republican	1995	Roswell
45	Sharon Cooper	Republican	2023	Marietta
46	John Carson	Republican	2011	Marietta
60	Sheila Jones	Democratic	2005	Areas with Atlanta post office addresses
61	Mekyah McQueen	Democratic	2025	Smyrna

=== 2020 voter suppression controversy ===
In 2020, in the turmoil surrounding the election defeat of Donald Trump, the chairman of the Cobb County Republicans and another person challenged the election results in an attempt to remove 16,024 Cobb County voters from eligibility to vote in the runoff election for both Georgia senators, scheduled for January 5, 2021. The county Board of Elections held a hearing to decide whether there was probable cause to move forward with hearings for each name on the list. The Board's attorney stated there was no probable cause and gave reasons. After a brief discussion, the board voted unanimously to deny the challenge.

=== Taxes ===
In addition to the 4% statewide sales tax, Cobb County levies an additional 2% for special projects, each 1% subject to separate renewal every few years by countywide referendum (including within its cities). This funds mainly transportation and parks. Cobb levies a 1% tax to lower property taxes, but only for the public school budget, and not the additional 1% HOST homestead exemption for general funds. The county has also voted not to pay the extra 1% to join MARTA.

At the beginning of 2006, Cobb became the last county in the state to raise the tax to 6%, which also doubled the tax on food to 2%. The SPLOST barely passed by a 114 vote margin, or less than one-quarter of a percent, in a September 2005 referendum. The revenue was to go to a new county courthouse, expanded jail, various transportation projects, and the purchasing of property for parks and green space. In 2008, the school tax was renewed for a third term, funding the Marietta and Cobb school systems.

== Economy ==
The Cobb County School District is Cobb County's largest employer, employing over 15,000 people.

Private corporations include:

- The Home Depot Atlanta Store Support Center, world headquarters
- The Weather Channel headquarters
- InTown Suites headquarters
- Lockheed Martin Aeronautical Plant, located next to Dobbins Air Reserve Base in unincorporated Cobb
- Kool Smiles (Marietta)
- GE Power headquarters
- Papa Johns "additional" headquarters

=== Retail ===
Shopping centers in the county include:

- Cobb Center
- Cobb Place - 335,000 sq. ft., originally opened 1987
- Cumberland Mall
- Town Center at Cobb

== Diplomatic missions ==
The Consulate-General of Costa Rica in Atlanta is located in Suite 100 at 1870 The Exchange in an unincorporated section of Cobb County.

== Transportation ==
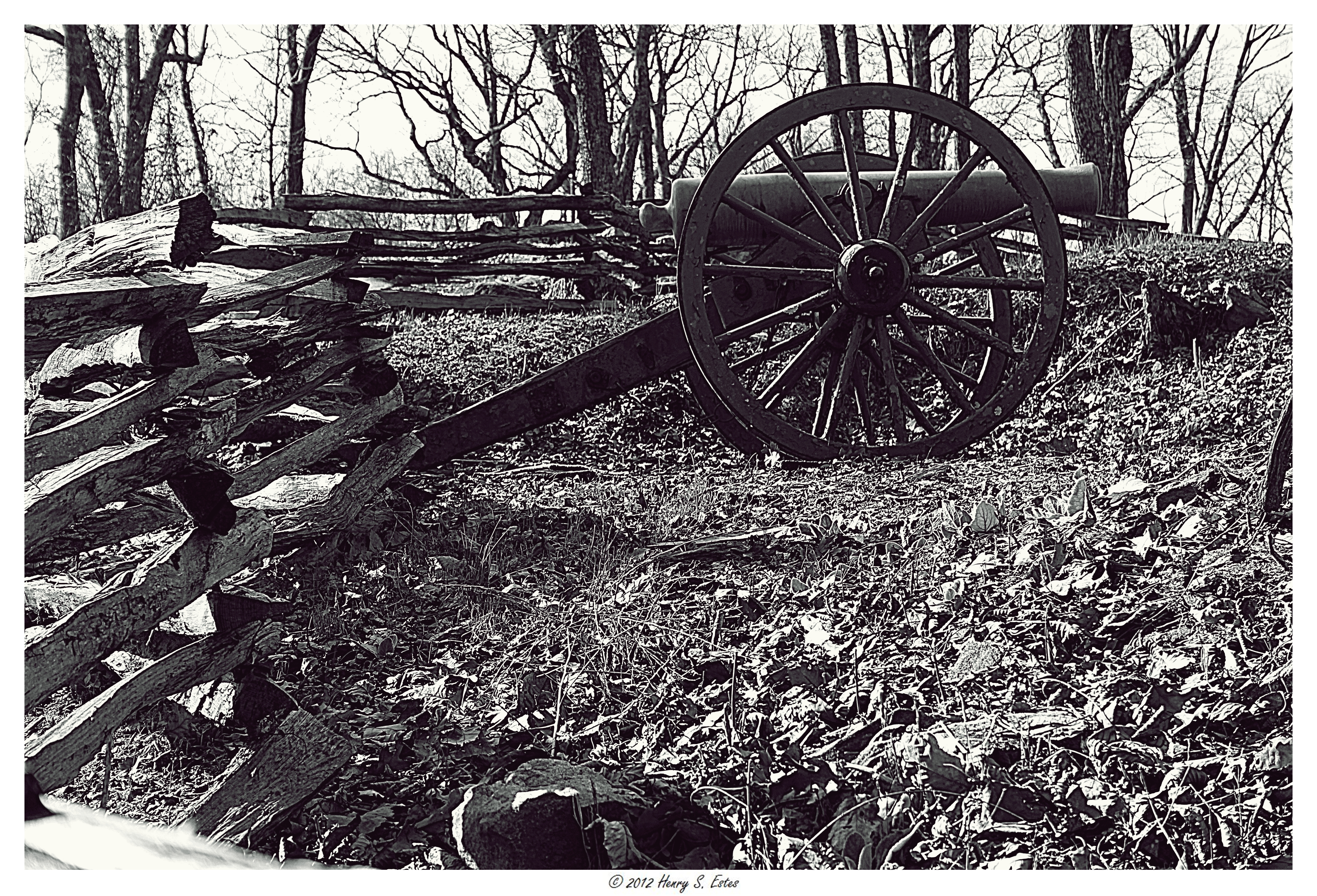
Kennesaw Mountain National Battlefield Park

=== Major highways ===
- I-20 / SR 402 (unsigned)
- I-75 / SR 401 (unsigned)
- I-285 / SR 407 (unsigned)
- I-575 / SR 417 (unsigned)
- US 41 / SR 3
  - SR 3 Conn. (Marietta)
- US 78 / SR 8
- US 278
- SR 5
  - SR 5 Conn. (Kennesaw)
  - SR 5 Spur (Marietta)
- SR 6
  - SR 6 Bus. (Powder Springs)
  - SR 6 Spur (Austell)
- SR 92
- SR 120
  - SR 120 Loop (Marietta)
- SR 139
- SR 280
- SR 360

=== Airports ===
- Cobb County International Airport at McCollum Field
- Dobbins Air Reserve Base (where the U.S. president usually arrives when visiting Atlanta)

=== Rail ===
- Norfolk Southern through Mableton, Austell, Powder Springs
- CSX Transportation through Acworth, Kennesaw, Marietta, Smyrna, and Vinings
- Georgia Northeastern Railroad A Short Line north from Marietta

Until 1971, the Louisville & Nashville Railroad, running on tracks now owned by CSX, operated passenger trains through Marietta depot.

Cobb County is not part of the MARTA Rail network, because its voters rejected MARTA development in a 1965 referendum which led to its creation.

=== Mass transit ===
- Xpress GA/RTA commuter buses and CobbLinc Marietta/Cobb Counties Transit System serve the county. MARTA also has a connecting bus service to the Cumberland, Georgia business district in the southeastern part of the county.

=== Pedestrians and cycling ===
- Acworth Trail
- Al Bishop Trail
- Big Shanty Trail
- Bob Callan Trail
- Chattahoochee River Trail
- Concord Rd Trail
- Cross County Trail
- Floyd Rd Trail
- Mountain to River Trail
- Mumbo Jumbo Trail
- Noonday Creek Trail
- Red Baron Trail
- Rottenwood Creek Trail
- Silver Comet Trail
- Turtle Back Trail

== Recreation ==
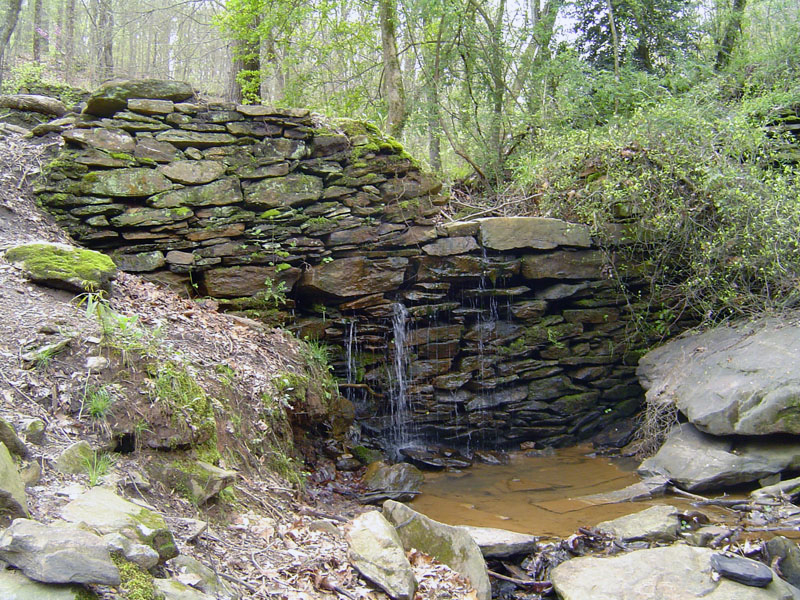
Sope Creek Ruins

Silver Comet Trail and bike path

- American Adventures (Marietta)
- Chattahoochee River National Recreation Area
- Kennesaw Mountain National Battlefield Park (Kennesaw to Marietta)
- Lake Acworth/Acworth Beach (Acworth)
- Lake Allatoona (near Acworth)
- Mable House (Mableton)
- Marietta Confederate Cemetery (Marietta)
- Marietta Museum of History (Marietta)
- Marietta/Cobb Museum of Art (Marietta)
- Marietta National Cemetery (Marietta)
- Silver Comet Trail (Smyrna, Mableton, Powder Springs)
- Six Flags Over Georgia (Austell)
- Six Flags White Water (Marietta)
- Southern Museum of Civil War and Locomotive History (Kennesaw)

=== Venues ===
- Cobb County Civic Center
- Cobb Energy Performing Arts Center
- Coca-Cola Roxy
- Mable House Amphitheater
- Truist Park

== Communities ==
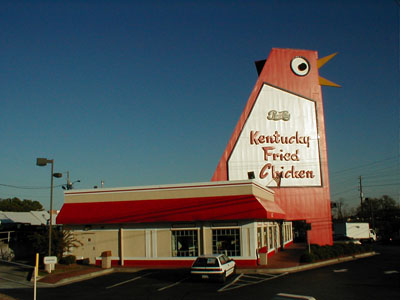
Cobb County landmark and reference point "The Big Chicken"

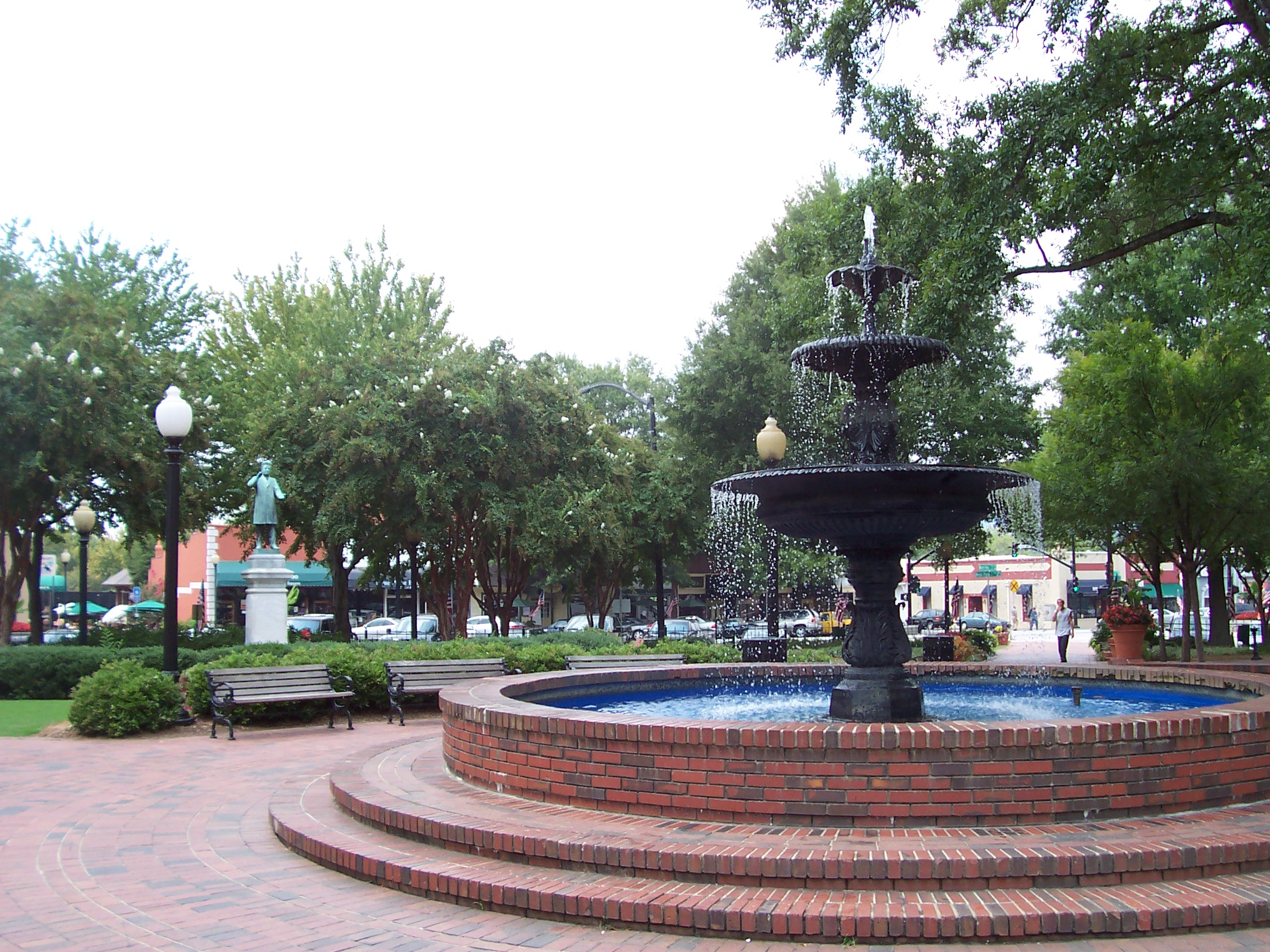
Historic Downtown Marietta

=== Cities ===
- Acworth
- Austell
- Kennesaw
- Mableton
- Marietta
- Powder Springs
- Smyrna

=== Census-designated places ===
- Fair Oaks
- Kennesaw State University
- Vinings

=== Unincorporated communities ===
- Chattahoochee Plantation
- Clarkdale
- Cumberland
- East Cobb
- Lost Mountain
- Mars Hill
- Mountain Ridge
- Noonday
- Sandy Plains
- Spring Hill
- Town Center

== Notable people ==
- Roy Barnes – Governor of Georgia, 1999–2003; born in Cobb County and worked there as a prosecutor
- Bob Barr – politician; United States Representative, Republican Party; Libertarian Party candidate for President of the United States
- Big Boss Man (Ray Traylor) – professional wrestler; corrections officer
- James V. Carmichael – member of the Georgia General Assembly, 1935–1940; candidate for governor of Georgia, 1946
- Louie Giglio – pastor, author, founder of the Passion Conferences, pastor of Passion City Church in Atlanta, head of sixstepsrecords
- Carter Kieboom - professional baseball player for the Washington Nationals
- Lil Yachty – rapper
- Dansby Swanson - professional baseball player for the Chicago Cubs

== Sister county ==
- Seongdong-gu, Seoul, South Korea

== See also ==
- National Register of Historic Places listings in Cobb County, Georgia
- List of counties in Georgia
