= Mars Hill, Georgia =

Unincorporated community in Georgia, U.S.

Coordinates: 34°02′06″N 84°41′30″W

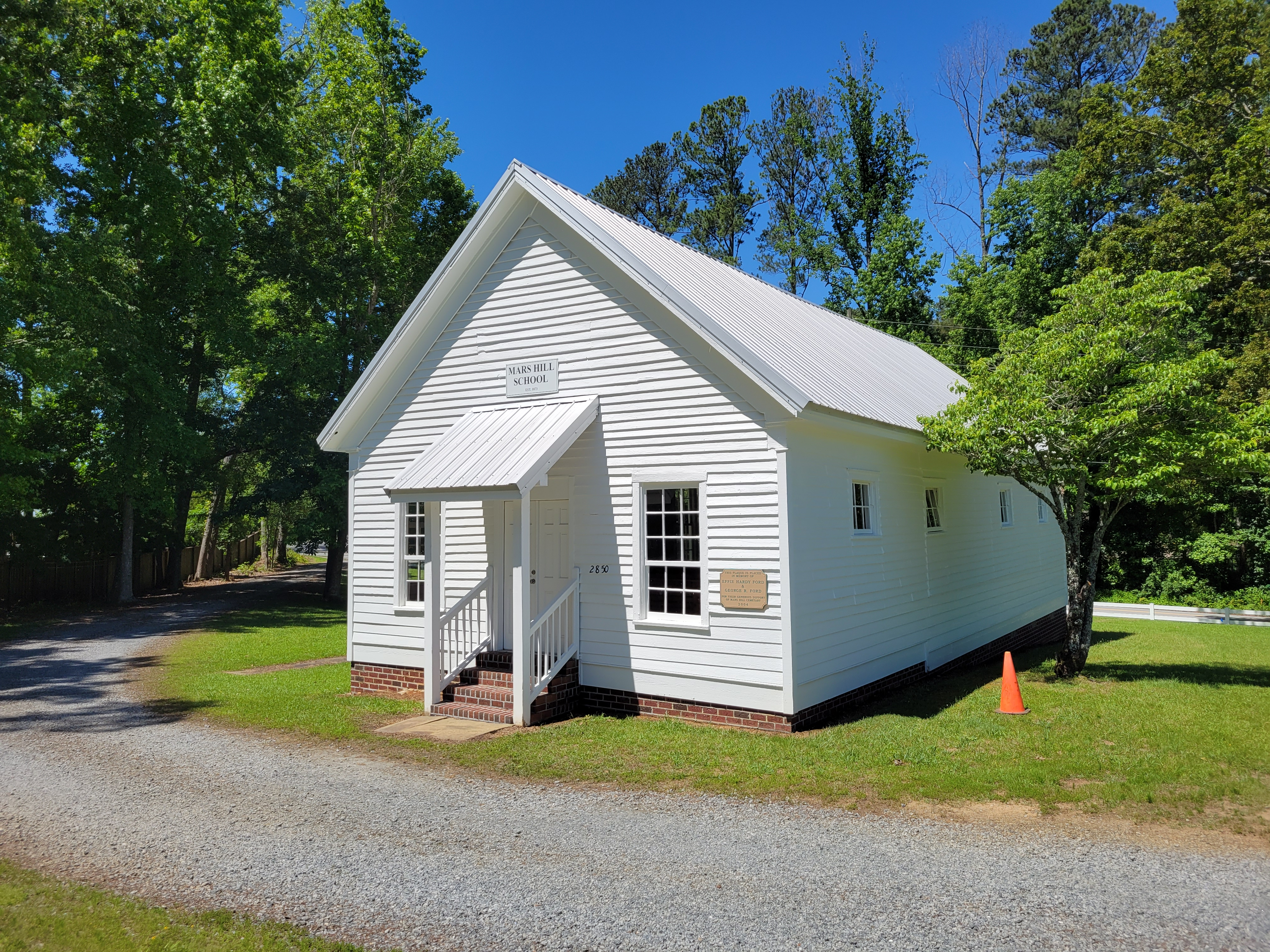
Mars Hill School

Mars Hill is an unincorporated community in Cobb County, in the U.S. state of Georgia.

Mars Hill Road is a primary corridor through the area and neighboring Lost Mountain. Residents in the community have either Acworth, Marietta, or Powder Springs addresses.

== History ==
Mars Hill was named after a local church, which in turn was named after Mars Hill (Areopagus) in Classical Athens.
