= Ed Setzler =

American politician

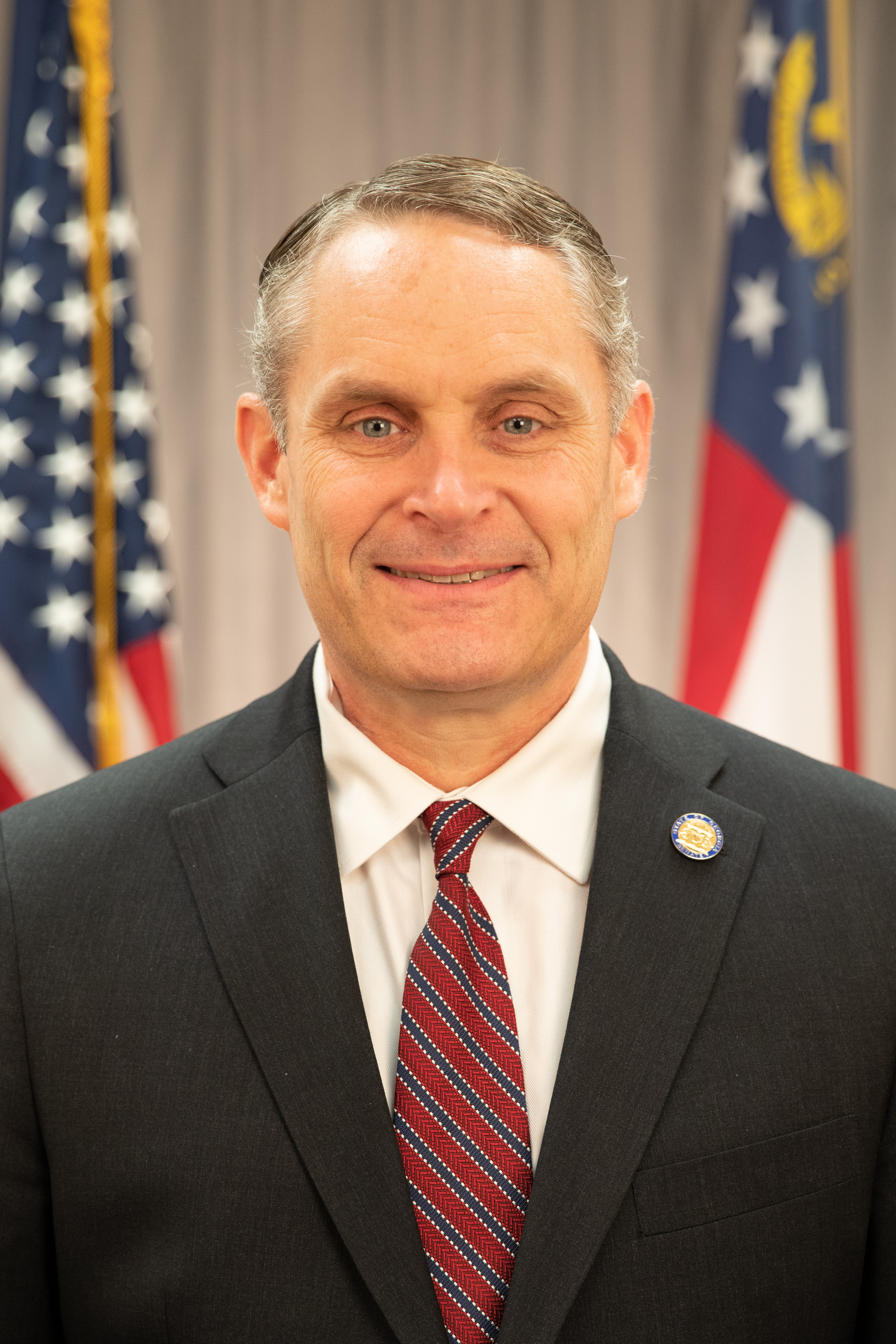
- Official portrait, 2023

Member of the Georgia Senate from the 37th district
- Incumbent
- Assumed office January 9, 2023
- Preceded by: Lindsey Tippins

Member of the Georgia House of Representatives from the 35th district
- In office January 10, 2005 – January 9, 2023
- Preceded by: Roger Hines
- Succeeded by: Lisa Campbell

Personal details
- Born: Leonard Edwin Setzler; March 18, 1970 (age 56)
- Party: Republican
- Education: Furman University (BS)

Leonard Edwin Setzler (born March 18, 1970) is an American politician from the state of Georgia. A member of the Republican Party, he has been a member of the Georgia Senate since 2023. From 2005 until 2023, he represented the 35th district in the Georgia House of Representatives.

== Early life, education, and career before politics ==
Setzler received a B.S. in physics from Furman University in 1992. He served in the U.S. Army, and is a retired Army Ranger. After leaving the military, he worked as an engineer.

== Political career ==
=== Elections ===
Setzler was elected to the state House from the 35th district, covers parts of northern Cobb County, Georgia. In 2004 and 2006, Setzler was unopposed in the general election. In 2008, Setzler was challenged by Democratic nominee Jason Adams, a middle school teacher, in the general election; Setzler received 60.8% of the vote to Adams' 39.2%. In 2010, Setzler defeated Democratic nominee Matthew D. Adams, receiving 64.6% to Adams' 35.4%. Selzer ran unopposed for reelection in 2012, 2014. and 2016, In 2018, Democratic nominee Salvatore Castellana, a restaurant owner and transportation manager, challenged Setzler for reelection. Setzler won more narrowly, with 52.3% of the vote to Castellana's 47.7%. In 2020, Setzler won reelection with 50.47% of the vote, defeating Democratic nominee Kyle Rinaudo, who received 49.53% of the vote.

In 2022, Setzler ran for the Georgia Senate in District 37, which contains parts of Cobb and Bartow counties. The district covers Kennesaw, Acworth, and West Cobb. He won with 58.84% of the vote, defeating Democratic nominee Vanessa Parker, who received 41.16% of the vote.

=== Abortion legislation ===
Since taking office in 2005, Setzler has frequently supported anti-abortion legislation. In 2019, he was the lead sponsor of Georgia House Bill 481, a six-week abortion ban in Georgia. Setzler initially included no exceptions in the legislation; a few exceptions were later added in order to secure enough votes for passage. The legislation was opposed by Georgia physicians, who feared that it would limit a physician's ability to provide medical care and advice that's in the best interest of the patient" and contains language that "could expose doctors to criminal prosecution for following what’s widely considered to be a medically acceptable standard of care." Setzler and the other anti-abortion advocates who supported for the legislation sought to use the law as a vehicle to overturn Roe v. Wade (1973).

Georgia governor Brian Kemp signed the legislation into law in May 2019, fulfilling a campaign promise to sign into law the nation's most stringent abortion ban, which was set to go into effect on January 1, 2020. However, the ACLU of Georgia, Planned Parenthood, and others challenged the legislation as unconstitutional; in October 2019, U.S. District Judge Steve C. Jones of the U.S. District Court for the Northern District of Georgia blocked the legislation from taking effect, and in July 2020, the court issued a permanent injunction declaring it unconstitutional. In 2022, however, the U.S. Supreme Court overturned Roe, and three weeks later, the U.S. Court of Appeals for the Eleventh Circuit vacated the district court's injunction.

=== Other legislation ===
In 2013, Setzler was named chairman of the House Committee on Science and Technology.

In 2012, Setzler introduced legislation, which passed the Georgia House and Senate, to make assisting suicide a felony in the state. The legislation was introduced after Georgia's earlier law on assisted suicide was struck down as unconstitutional by the Georgia Supreme Court.

Setzler has introduced legislation to ban embryonic stem cell research in Georgia.

In 2015, Setzler introduced legislation that would have eliminated Georgia's 4 percent state sales tax on gasoline, lowered state income tax rates, created a flatter tax structure; and "gradually raise the excise tax on fuel over the next eight years."

Setzler was an outspoken critic of proposals to expand the number of conditions for which patients are eligible for CBD oil for medical use in Georgia.

In January 2024, Seltzer co-sponsored S.B. 390, which would withhold government funding for any libraries in Georgia affiliated with the American Library Association.

== Personal life ==
Seltzer and his wife Tracie have four children; they live in Acworth.
