= Cobb County International Airport =

Airport in Georgia, United States

Cobb County International Airport at McCollum Field

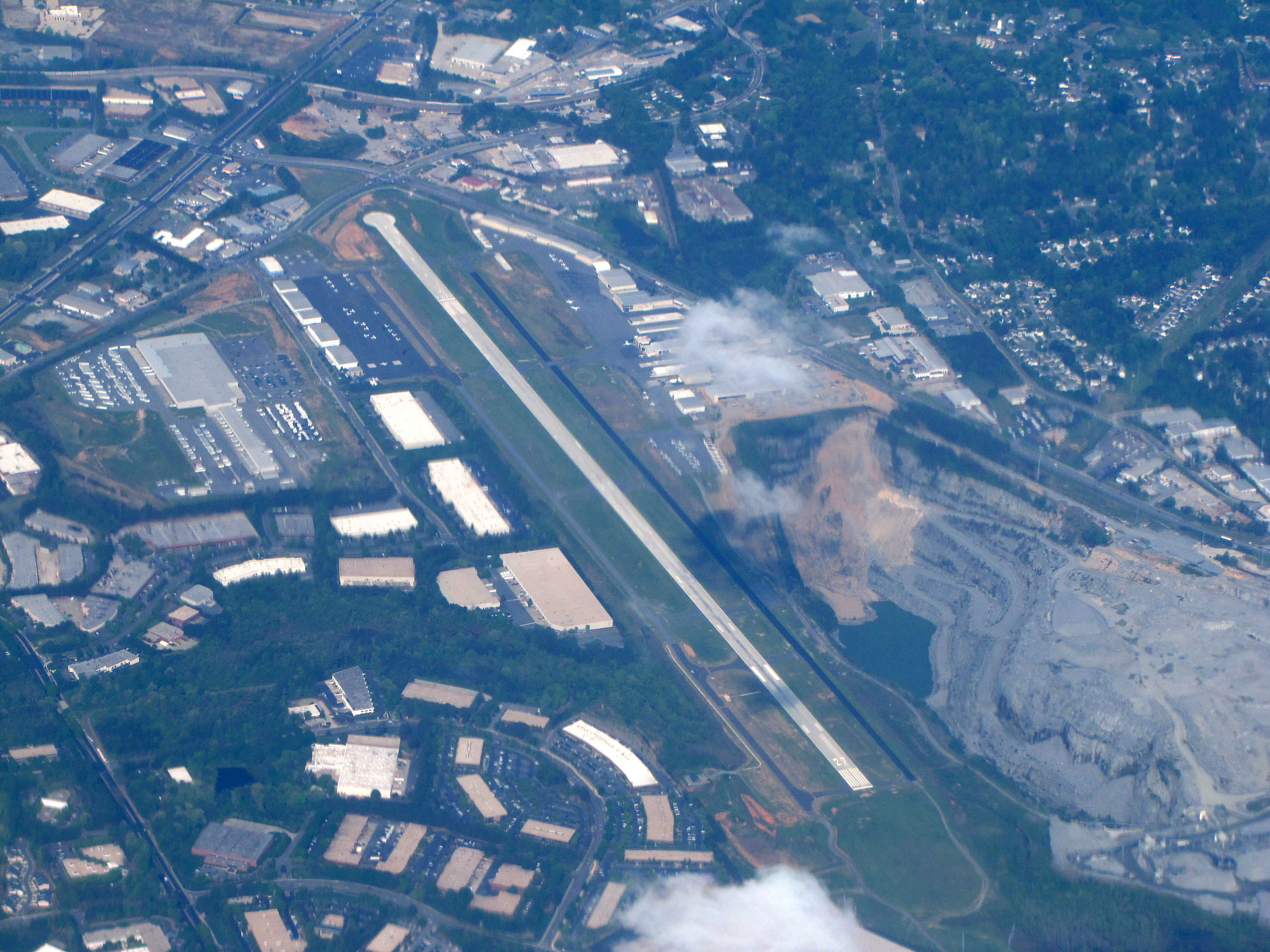
- Cobb County International Airport in 2012
- IATA: none; ICAO: KRYY; FAA LID: RYY

Summary
- Airport type: Public
- Owner: Cobb County
- Operator: County Department of Transportation
- Serves: Atlanta
- Location: Kennesaw, Georgia
- Hub for: Hawthorne Global Aviation Services
- Elevation AMSL: 1,040 ft (320 m)
- Coordinates: 34°00′47″N 084°35′55″W
- Website: cobbcounty.org/transportation/airport

Map
- Location of airport in Georgia RYY (the United States)

Runways
Direction	Length		Surface
Direction	ft	m	Surface
9/27	6,295	1,919	Asphalt

Statistics (2021)
- Aircraft operations: 95,572
- Based aircraft: 321
- Source: Federal Aviation Administration

Cobb County International Airport - McCollum Field (ICAO: KRYY, FAA LID: RYY) is a public airport located 21 miles (34 km) northwest of the central business district of Atlanta, immediately south of the city of Kennesaw in Cobb County, Georgia, United States. It operates 24 hours per day, although it is not controlled between the hours of midnight and 6:00 a.m. (EST/EDT). It is also designated as a weather station.

The airport is located on 309 acres (125 ha) of land, has one runway which is 6,295 feet (1,919 m) long, and is east–west oriented, with headings of 089 and 269. Cobb Place is at the east end, with Cobb Parkway (U.S. 41) and old 41 intersecting McCollum Parkway on the west end. The airfield sits at 1,040 feet (320 m) above mean sea level somewhat above average terrain for the area. The airport has a control tower. The airport also has a restaurant built directly beside the runway called Elevation Chophouse & Skybar; patrons can watch aircraft take off and land from their tables.

The airport has approximately 321 aircraft based there at the end of December 2021: 212 single engine, 35 multi-engine, 61 jet aircraft, 11 helicopters, and 2 glider. 82 percent of operations are general aviation, 16 percent is air taxi, and 2 percent is military. No major commercial airlines service Cobb County Airport, but there are two charter companies and two major fixed-base operators. Aerial tours are very popular at the airport, largely because the scenic Appalachian Mountains are less than a 30-minute flight away.

McCollum Field is owned by Cobb County, operated by the County Department of Transportation, characterizing it as a municipal airport. It is managed by a full-time, professional airport manager. The airport employs approximately 900 people, and had an annual economic impact of more than US$129 million to the local economy in 2020.

== History ==
McCollum Field opened in 1960 with a single 4,000-foot (1,200 m) runway. There was a stub taxiway connecting the runway with the ramp area, 60,000 square feet (5,600 square metres) of aprons, and a single administration building. The airport steadily grew over the next 30 years with the greatest developments occurring in the early 1990s.

In 1991, the airport layout plan was first revised. The first full service fixed-base operator opened in 1992. A second full service fixed-base operator opened a year later. That same year, the Georgia State Patrol Hangar was constructed. The Air Traffic Control Tower was opened in 1995, followed by an Instrument Landing System glide slope the next year. Over the course of the decade, there were four major purchases of new land at a total cost of US$3.8 million in grants and an unspecified amount in local funds. In addition, 6 new hangars were built.

McCollum Field was first designed as a small field for general aviation. It is designated as a reliever airport for Hartsfield-Jackson Airport and DeKalb-Peachtree Airport. Cobb County is also the primary general aviation airport for the Atlanta suburban population. As of 2024, it is the third most trafficked airport in Georgia with an average of 375 takeoffs and landings each day.

=== 2008 runway ===
On December 4, 2008, the new 6,295 by 100 feet (1,919 by 30 m) wide concrete runway was opened at 13:00 local time. The runway took 23 days to complete. During the runway construction of RWY "9-27" taxiway "A" was made temporary runway "8-26".

== See also ==
- List of airports in Georgia (U.S. state)
