= Georgia's 35th House of Representatives district =

State district in Georgia, USA

Georgia's 35th State House of Representatives district
Representative
Lisa Campbell; D–Kennesaw
- Demographics: 60.2% White; 23.7% Black; 8.8% Hispanic; 4.2% Asian
- Population: 54,609

District 35 elects one member of the Georgia House of Representatives. It contains parts of Cobb County.

== Members ==
- Ed Setzler (2005–2023)
- Lisa Campbell (since 2023)
