= Lake Acworth =

Artificial lake southwest of the city of Acworth, Georgia, USA

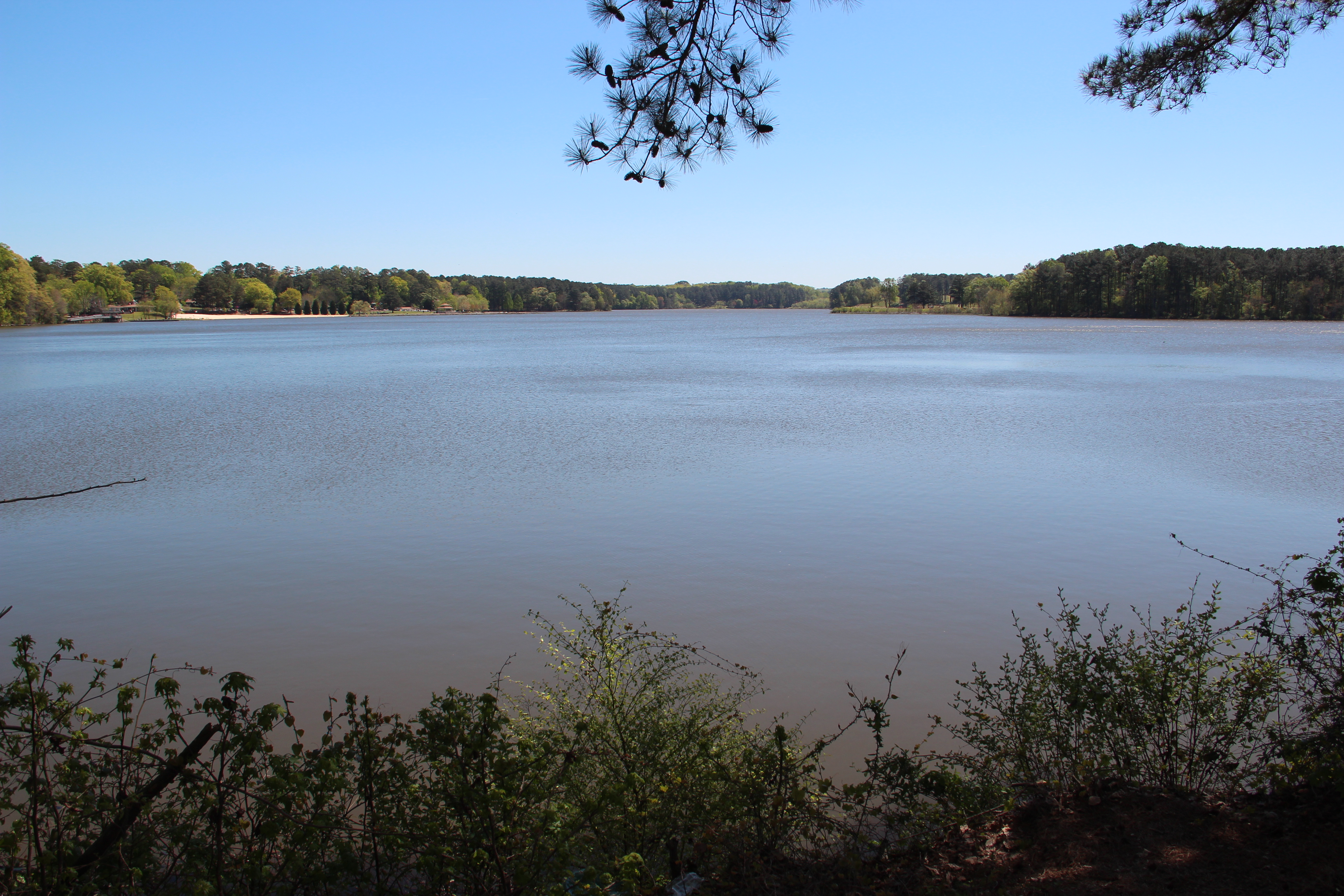
- View of Lake Acworth

- Location within Georgia Location within the United States
- Location: Acworth, Georgia
- Coordinates: 34°03′28″N 84°40′50″W
- Primary inflows: Proctor Creek, Butler Creek
- Basin countries: United States
- Surface area: 260 acres (110 ha)
- Surface elevation: 846 ft (258 m)

Lake Acworth is a 260-acre (110 ha) artificial lake southwest of the city of Acworth, Georgia. It is in the extreme northwestern part of Cobb County. The lake impounds Proctor Creek (not the same as Proctor Creek in nearby Atlanta) and Butler Creek. It outflows into Lake Allatoona. The low dam is at the point where State Route 92 (Lake Acworth Drive) crossed over prior to 2023 (34.0584°N 84.693°W). The lake was formed by a 48-foot-wide concrete dam that was built by the US Army Corps of Engineers in 1950, during the construction of Lake Allatoona. A detailed, video-recorded oral history of the lake’s creation and the federal/state/ocal politics which played a part in its formation is available from the Save Acworth History Foundation via YouTube.

The city operates Acworth Beach, a public beach and park along the lake's northern shore. It was created by trucking white sand in and putting it over the rust-red clay soil common to the region. Swimming is roped off with floats for protection from the boaters. The Lake Acworth Beach and Beachhouse were added to the National Register of Historic Places in 2010. The city also operates South Shore Park, located on the south side of the lake off of Ragsdale Rd. This park also offers a white sand swimming beach and boating ingress / egress. The final city operated park on the lake is Overlook Park and is located on the western shore. It was established in 2023 when the old 2-lane route of Hwy 92 that crossed over the Lake Acworth dam was decommissioned with the opening of the newly constructed 4-lane bridge of Hwy 92 over Lake Allatoona. While no swimming area is provided, this park is popular with lake kayakers and especially anglers, as fishing access to either the Lake Acworth Dam itself or the lake’s outflow into Lake Allatoona is available. Access to either end of this narrow shaped park is possible via Hwy 92 or Ragsdale Rd.

Boating is permitted on Lake Acworth, with the only motorization allowed being electric powered trolling motors.

The lake is home to many common species of fish (ie panfish, bass, catfish, etc.), and fishing is permitted with a Georgia state fishing license.
