= Georgia's 46th House of Representatives district =

State district in Georgia, USA

Georgia's 46th State House of Representatives district
Representative
John Carson; R–Marietta
- Demographics: 78.5% White; 7.4% Black; 6.9% Hispanic; 4.5% Asian
- Population: 55,876

District 46 elects one member of the Georgia House of Representatives. It contains parts of Cherokee County and Cobb County.

== Members ==
- John Carson (since 2011)
