= Lisa Campbell (politician) =

American politician

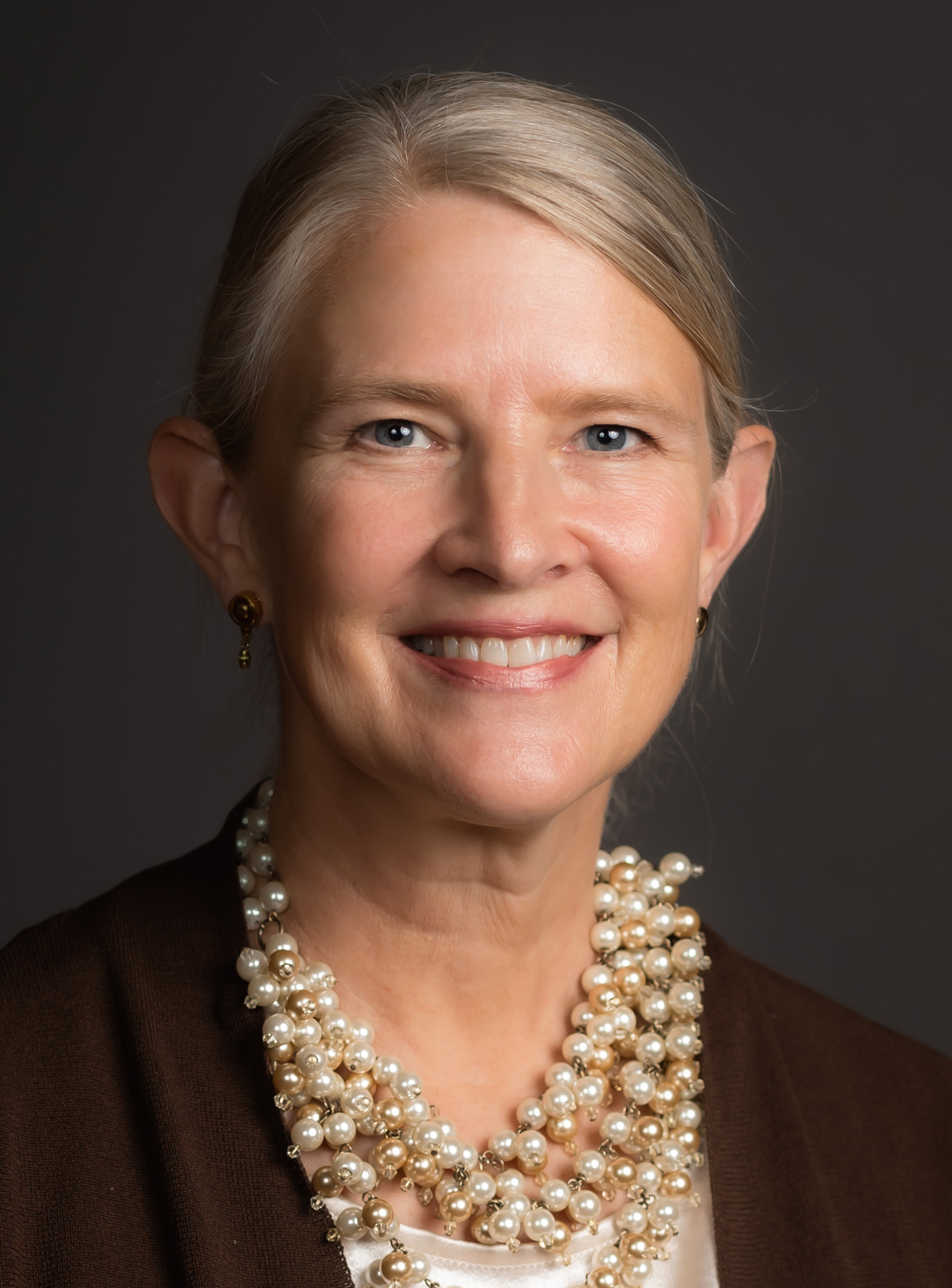

Member of the Georgia House of Representatives from the 35th district
- Incumbent
- Assumed office January 9, 2023
- Preceded by: Ed Setzler

Personal details
- Born: El Paso, Texas, U.S.
- Party: Democratic
- Education: University of Georgia

Lisa Gayle Campbell is an American politician from the Georgia Democratic Party who serves as a member of the Georgia House of Representatives representing District 35. Her district contains the cities of Kennesaw and Acworth.

Lisa was elected to the Georgia House of Representatives in November 2022, becoming the first woman to represent District 35. Before entering politics, she built a 30-year career as an organizational consultant, specializing in strategic planning, branding, technology, public relations, and community development. She founded BRANDfit Consulting, where she worked with top global companies like Delta Air Lines, Coca-Cola, The Home Depot, and General Motors.

Lisa also has a background in technology, having been an equity investor and operating partner at Creative Digital Group, and later, the first female managing director of LBi's Atlanta office. Her leadership roles span major marketing and tech firms such as MRY/Publicis, BBDO, and Carlson.

Beyond her career, Lisa is deeply involved in community service, holding board positions with organizations like Hope Springs Housing and Hands On Atlanta, and supporting causes such as The Carter Center, Planned Parenthood, and the ACLU.

Born in El Paso, Texas, and raised in Marietta, Georgia, Lisa earned a degree in English from the University of Georgia. After living in Memphis, Nashville, and Detroit, she returned to Georgia in 2000 and now resides in Kennesaw. In her free time, she enjoys hosting the "Politics and Poetry" podcast, gardening, cooking, hiking, and spending time with her family and cocker spaniel Lily. Lisa supports policies that promote education, healthcare, the environment, and equal rights.
