= Roger Bruce =

American politician from Georgia (born 1953)

Member of the Georgia House of Representatives
- In office January 13, 2003 – January 13, 2025
- Succeeded by: Mekyah McQueen
- Constituency: 45th district (2003–2005); 64th district (2005–2013); 61st district (2013–2025)

Personal details
- Born: May 9, 1953 (age 73) New York City, New York, U.S.
- Party: Democratic

Roger Bruce (born May 9, 1953) is an American politician. He is a former member of the Georgia House of Representatives from the 61st District, serving from 2003 until 2025. He is a member of the Democratic Party.

Bruce and Jaha Howard, also a Democrat, advanced to the December 16, 2025 runoff for Georgia's 35th Senate district.
