= Georgia's 61st House of Representatives district =

State district in Georgia, USA

Georgia's 61st State House of Representatives district
Representative
Mekyah McQueen; D–Smyrna
- Demographics: 16.1% White; 72.2% Black; 9.4% Hispanic; 1.1% Asian
- Population: 62,109

District 61 elects one member of the Georgia House of Representatives. It contains parts of Cobb County and Fulton County.

== Members ==
- Roger Bruce (2013–2025)
- Mekyah McQueen (since 2025)
