= Mountain Ridge, Georgia =

US community

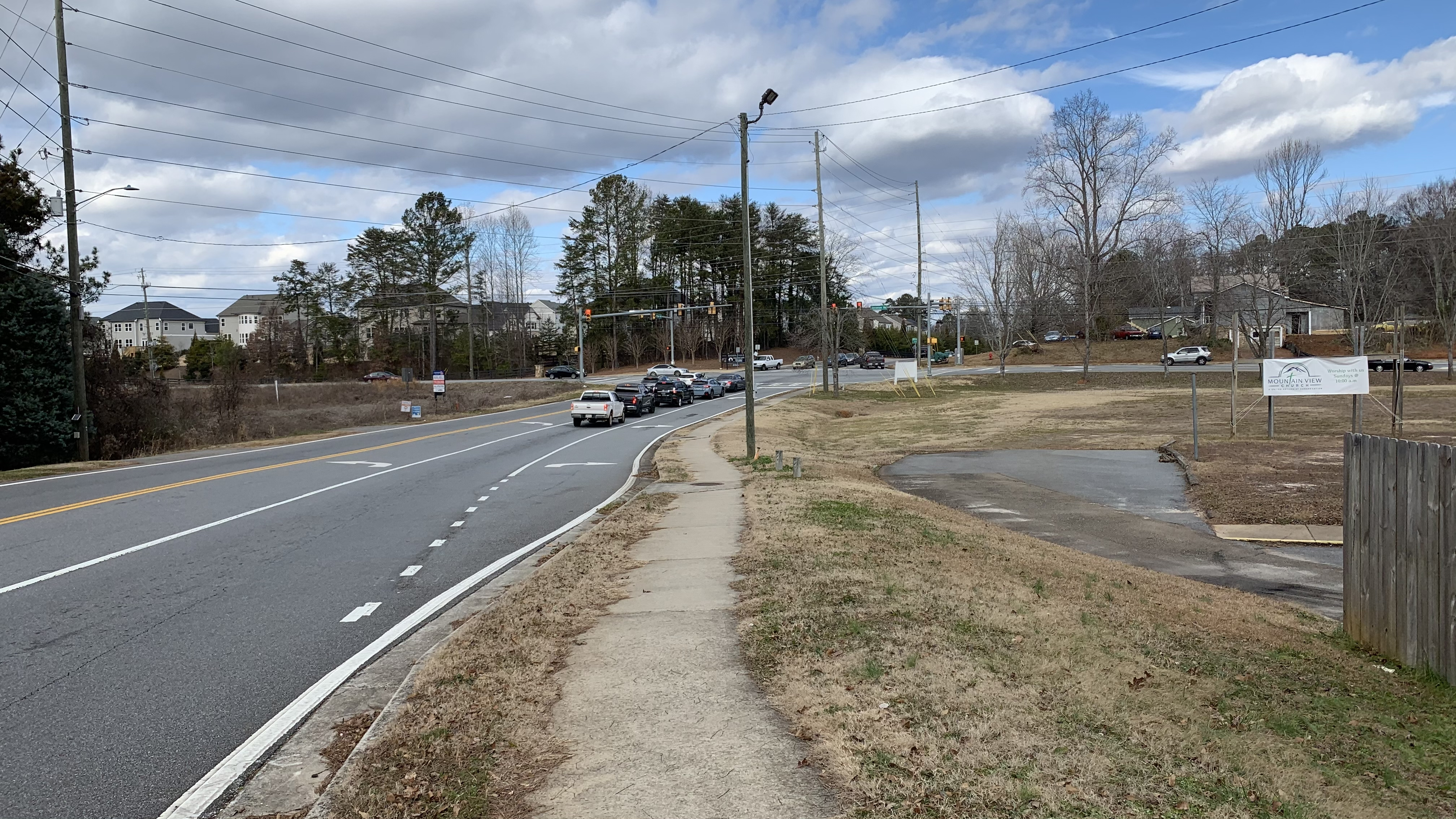
Mountain Ridge from Trickum Road

Mountain Ridge is an unincorporated community in Cherokee County, Georgia, United States.
