= Mekyah McQueen =

American politician

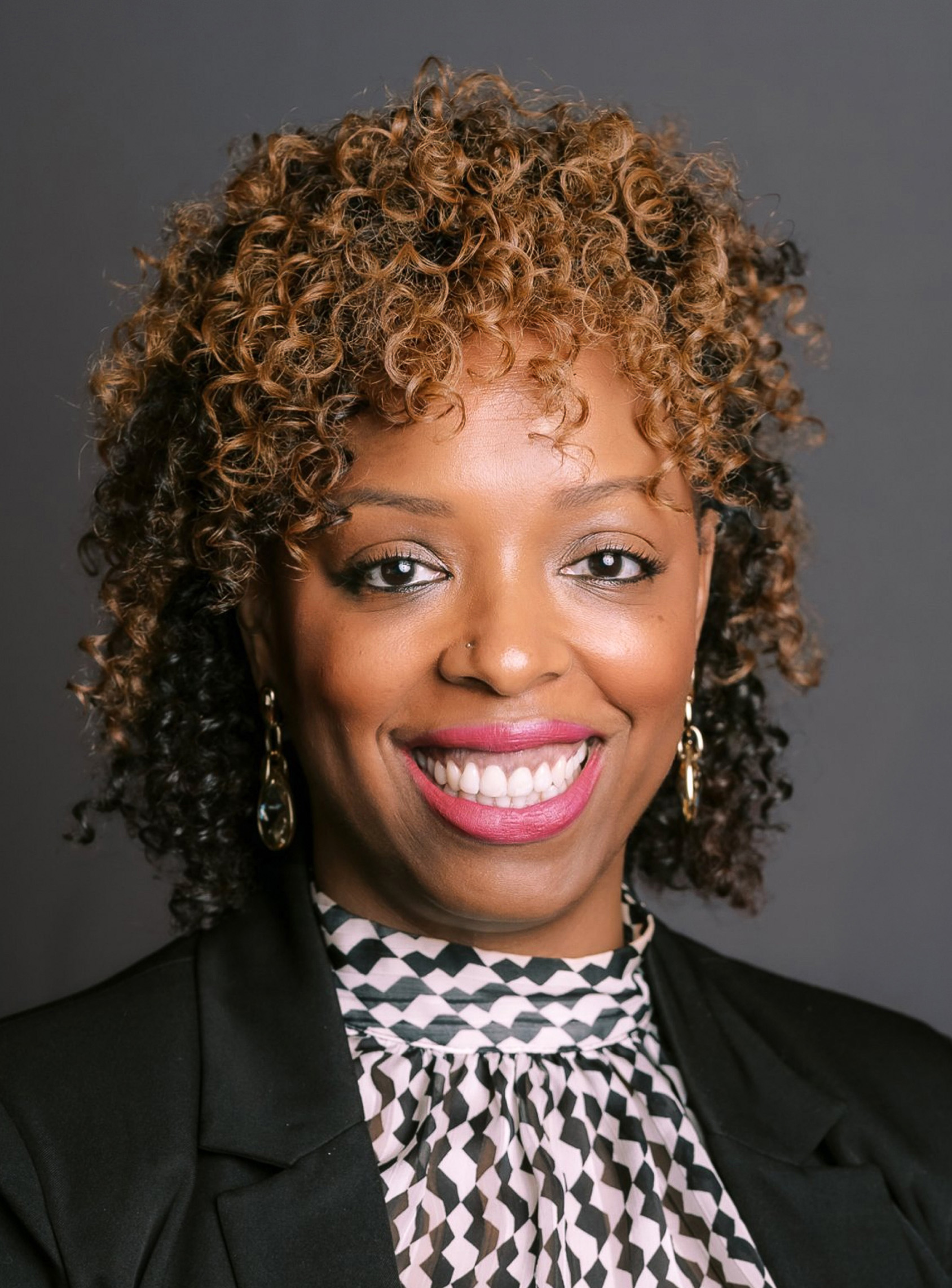

Member of the Georgia House of Representatives from the 61st district
- Incumbent
- Assumed office January 13, 2025
- Preceded by: Roger Bruce

Personal details
- Party: Democratic
- Education: Spelman College
- Website: https://www.mcqueenforga.com/

Mekyah Qiana McQueen is an American politician who was elected member of the Georgia House of Representatives for the 61st district in 2024.

McQueen is an educator and community advocate.
