= Lost Mountain, Georgia =

- Unincorporated Community
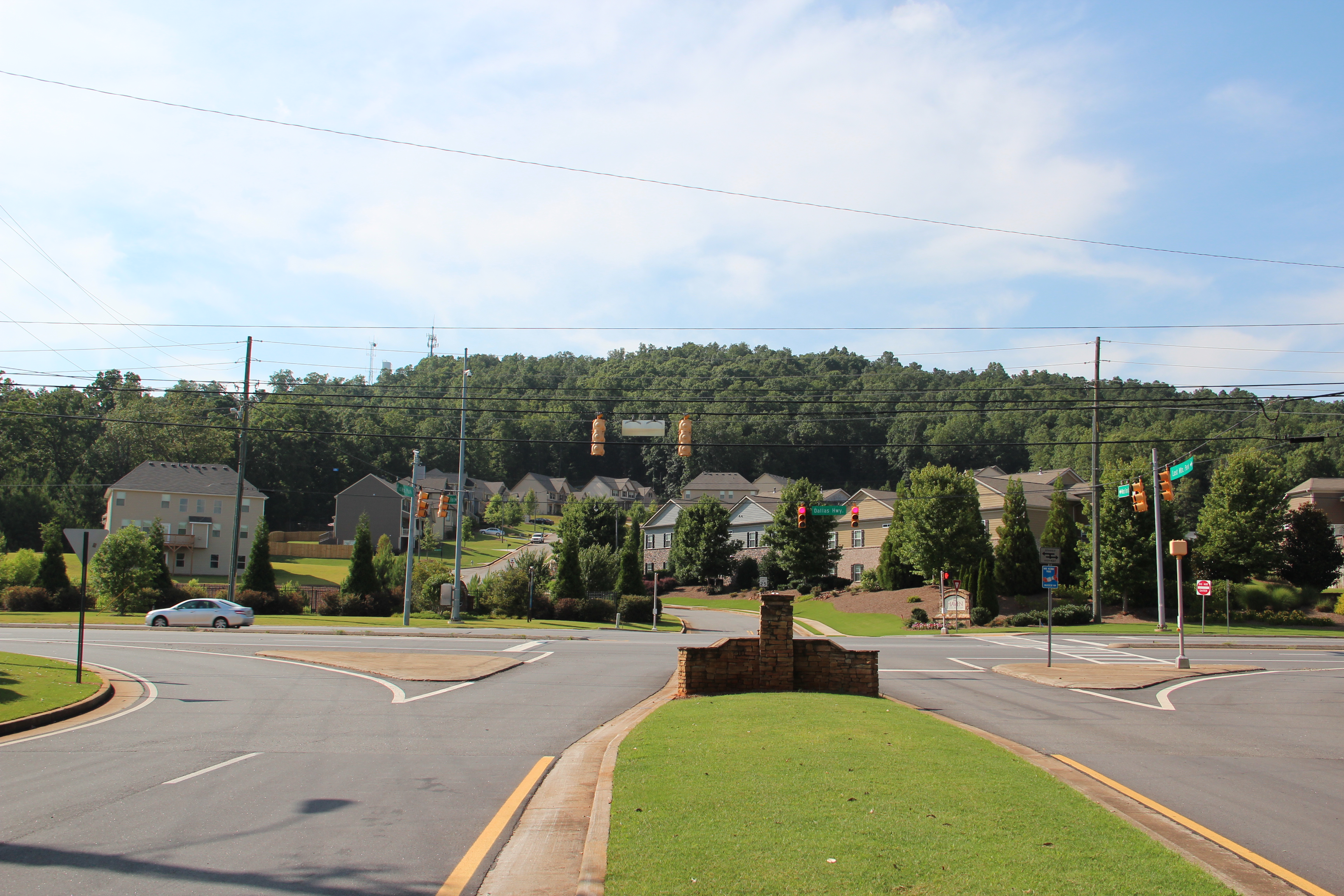
- Lost Mountain Park

- Location within Metro Atlanta
- Coordinates: 33°56′26″N 84°42′09″W
- Country: United States
- State: Georgia
- County: Cobb
- Elevation: 1,516 ft (462 m)

Population (2022)
  - Total: 73,312
- Time zone: UTC-5 (Eastern (EST))
  - Summer (DST): UTC-4 (EDT)
- ZIP Code: 30127
- Area codes: 770/678/470/404

Lost Mountain is an unincorporated community in Cobb County, in the U.S. state of Georgia. The suburban community lays about 30 miles northwest of Atlanta and, alongside the rest of Cobb County is a part of Metro Atlanta. While not officially incorporated, the area has approximately 73,312 residents in the general area.

== History ==
This northwest Atlanta suburb takes its name from a summit of the same name near the original town site. A variant name is "Lost Mountain Crossroads." A post office called Lost Mountain was established in 1848, and remained in operation until 1902.

The community's name derives from an old Cherokee legend. The legend, known to have several versions, all have a similar theme. A chief has a daughter that is lost in the woods around the mountain leading him to grieve the rest of his life and he names the hill "Lost Mountain" for that is the place she was last seen.

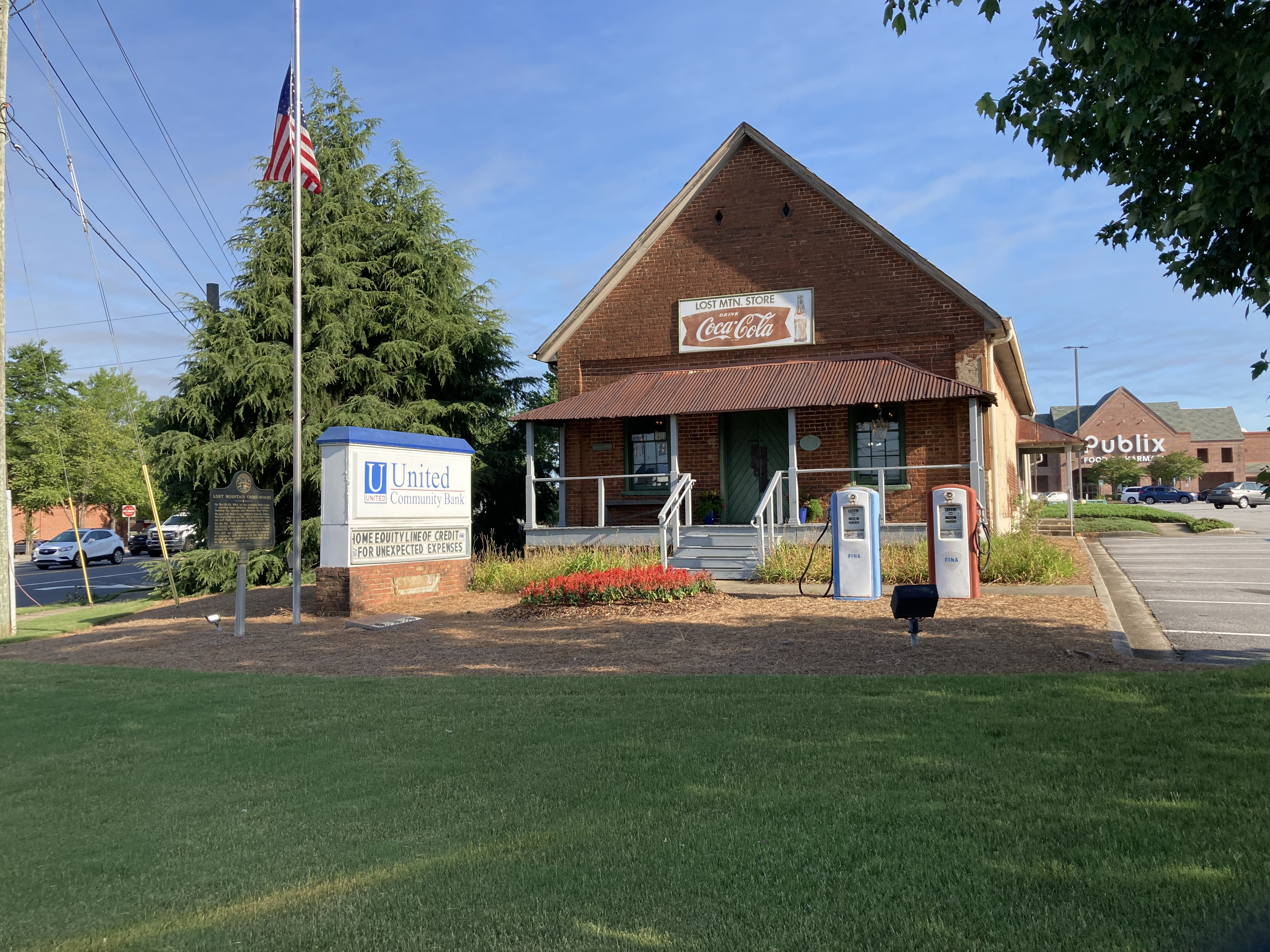
The Historic Lost Mountain Store

The Lost Mountain store is a major landmark for the area, It has gone from the only store to a relic from another time stuck in the middle of the present day shopping centers of suburban Atlanta and yet it stands as it has since 1881. Mars Hill Community Church is located across the street from The Lost Mountain Store.

== Proposed City of Lost Mountain ==
On May 22, 2022, a ballot measure failed that would have led to the incorporation of the City of Lost Mountain.
