= John Carson (Georgia politician) =

American politician

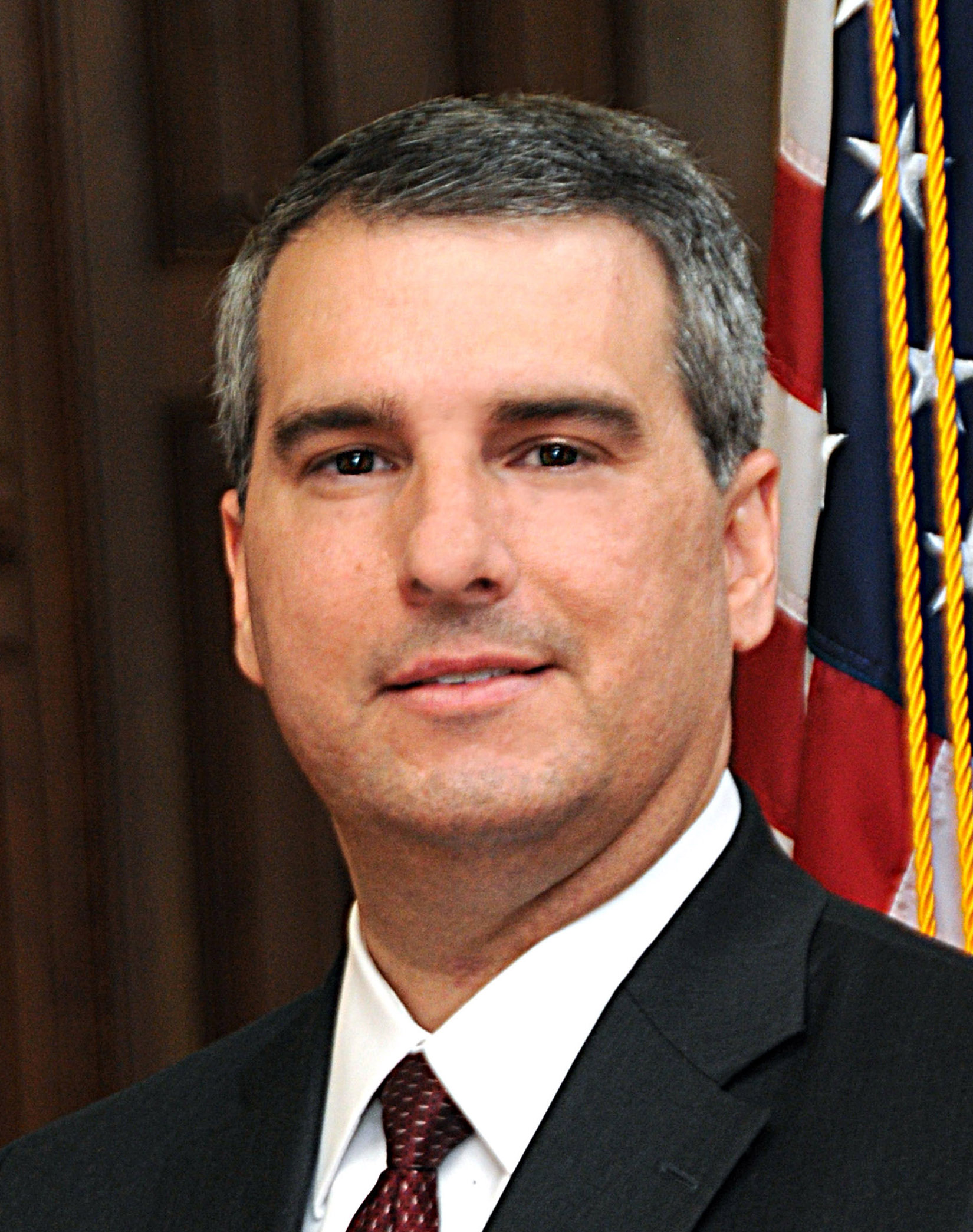
- Official portrait, 2025

Member of the Georgia House of Representatives from the 46th district
- Incumbent
- Assumed office November 1, 2011

Personal details
- Born: September 21, 1971 (age 54)
- Party: Republican
- Spouse: Beverly

John K. Carson (born September 21, 1971) is an American politician from Georgia. Carson is a Republican member of Georgia House of Representatives for District 46. He was first elected in 2011.

== Political career ==
In 2019, Carson was named Legislator of the Year by the Georgia Public Health Association.

In 2022, Carson introduced legislation that would place the International Holocaust Remembrance Alliance's definition of antisemitism into the state's legal code. Supporters argued the bill would provide clarity for hate crime and anti-discrimination prosecutions, while opponents argued it would harm protected free speech or target criticism of Israel. The bill passed the House, but not the Senate.

== Electoral history ==
Georgia state House District 46 General Election, 2012
Party	Candidate	Votes	%
Democratic	Kevin Westphal	7,132	26.34%
Republican	John Carson	19,941	73.66%
Total votes		27,073	100.0%

Georgia state House District 46 General Election, 2014
Party	Candidate	Votes	%
Republican	John Carson	16,407	100%
Total votes		16,407	100.0%

Georgia state House District 46 General Election, 2016
Party	Candidate	Votes	%
Republican	John Carson	24,736	100%
Total votes		24,736	100.0%

Georgia state House District 46 General Election, 2018
Party	Candidate	Votes	%
Democratic	Karín Sandiford	10,789	38.18%
Republican	John Carson	17,466	61.82%
Total votes		28,255	100.0%

Georgia state House District 46 General Election, 2020
Party	Candidate	Votes	%
Democratic	Caroline L. Holko	13,615	38.54%
Republican	John Carson	21,712	61.46%
Total votes		35,327	100.0%

Georgia state House District 46 General Election, 2022
Party	Candidate	Votes	%
Democratic	Micheal Garza	12,057	40.22%
Republican	John Carson	17,920	59.78%
Total votes		29,977	100.0%

Georgia state House District 46 General Election, 2024
Party	Candidate	Votes	%
Democratic	Micheal Garza	15,274	41.12%
Republican	John Carson	21,875	58.88%
Total votes		37,149	100.0%
