= Acworth, Georgia =

- City
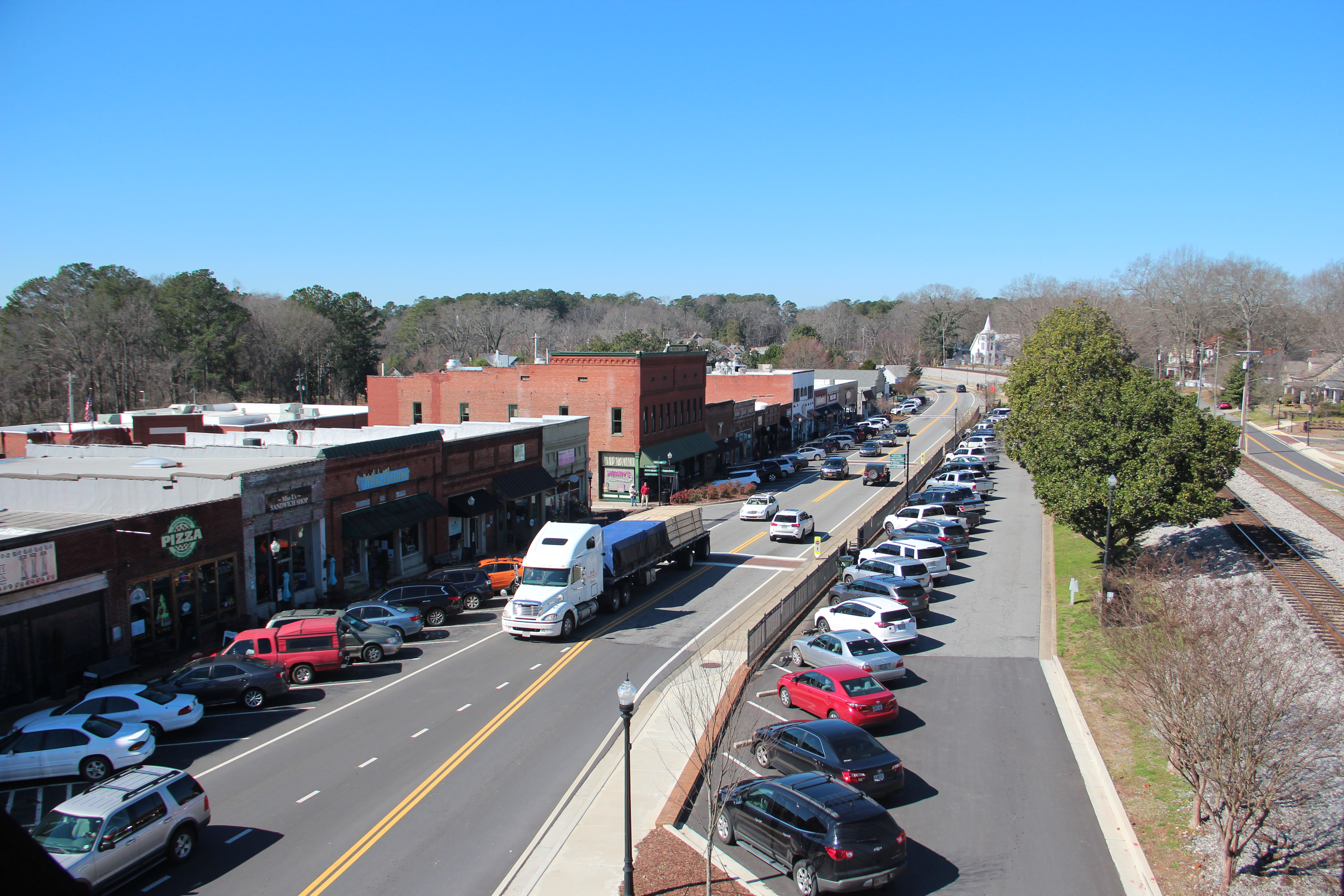
- Downtown Acworth (2020)

- Flag Logo
- Motto: The Lake City
- Interactive map of Acworth, Georgia
- Coordinates: 34°03′46″N 84°40′12″W
- Country: United States
- State: Georgia
- County: Cobb
- Incorporated: 1840

Government
  - Mayor: Tommy Allegood

Area
  - Total: 9.79 sq mi (25.36 km^{2})
  - Land: 9.09 sq mi (23.54 km^{2})
  - Water: 0.70 sq mi (1.81 km^{2})

Population (2020)
  - Total: 22,440
  - Density: 2,468.5/sq mi (953.11/km^{2})
- Time zone: UTC-5 (EST)
  - Summer (DST): UTC-4 (EDT)
- ZIP Code: 30101, 30102
- Area code: 770; 678, 470, and 943
- FIPS code: 13-00408
- Website: acworth-ga.gov

Acworth is a city in Cherokee County, Georgia and Cobb County, Georgia, United States. It is part of Metro Atlanta. As of the 2020 census, this city had a population of 22,440, up from 20,425 in 2010. Acworth is located in the foothills of the North Georgia mountains along the southeastern banks of Lake Acworth and Lake Allatoona on the Etowah River. Unincorporated areas known as Acworth extend into Bartow, Cherokee, and Paulding counties.

Acworth is often referred to as "the Lake City" because of its proximity to Lake Allatoona and Lake Acworth.

== History ==
Like the rest of Cobb County, the area now containing Acworth was carved out of the former Cherokee Nation in 1831 after the natives were expelled.

The Western and Atlantic Railroad was completed through town in 1840. A watering station for the locomotives was established there.

The town received its current name in 1843 from Western & Atlantic Railroad engineer Joseph L. Gregg, who named it for his hometown of Acworth, New Hampshire, which was named for the former Royal Navy Surveyor Sir Jacob Acworth.

Telegraph lines reached the town in 1851.

A private school was opened for white students in 1852. A newer private school operated from 1899 to 1935, when they integrated with the Cobb County School District. Until 1935, high school students from Acworth paid tuition to attend. Students outside the town were subsidized by the Cobb County School Board. Black students were educated separately in a grammar school. The closest Black high school was in Atlanta. Later, students were bused by the county to a segregated school in Marietta.

Acworth was incorporated on December 1, 1860.

Volunteers to fight in the Civil War enlisted in what became Company A ("Acworth Infantry") in the 18th Georgia Volunteer Infantry and Company C ("Invincibles") in the 41st Georgia Volunteer Infantry.

The town was captured by the Union on June 6, 1864. The city was called "Little Shanty" by the Union troops, to contrast it with the next town south, "Big Shanty", since renamed Kennesaw. The town was under martial law during the six months of occupation. On November 13, 1864, the town was burned down by the army of General W. T. Sherman, sparing 12 homes and one church; its citizens were left destitute.

The town had nearly recovered by the 1880s. Cotton farming in the area peaked from the 1890s through the 1920s. Low prices during the Great Depression resulted in a cessation of cotton farming in the area and throughout Cobb County.

During segregation, the railroad tracks served as a racial divide, with African Americans living to the northeast of the tracks and the whites to the southwest. There were few common public events. When a movie theater was erected in the 1930s, Blacks were allowed to access the balcony from a separate entrance. Whites sat on the main floor.

Volunteers formed a fire department in 1907.

There were eventually three textile mills in town from 1905 through the 1980s. They employed about 800 workers at their peak.

In 1926, Main Street was paved. When the entire Dixie Highway (old U.S. Route 41 and part of the Cherokee Peachtree Trail) was paved in 1929, over 800 tourist vehicles entered the city daily.

When the Etowah River was dammed, forming Lake Allatoona, citizens feared that land near the town would become a swamp. They successfully petitioned for a second dam, resulting in Lake Acworth in the 1950s.

The town made a major improvement in its water and sewage lines in the late 1940s.

The city elected its first woman mayor, Mary McCall, in 1956 and 1961–66.

African-American students were schooled separately from white children until 1967.

Acworth was recognized as a 2010 All-America City Award winner by the National Civic League.

In 2011, the filming of several scenes for the Footloose remake took place in downtown Acworth. The Acworth Presbyterian Church was used as the primary church, and the house of Mayor Tommy Allegood was used as Julianne Hough's character's home.

In 2017, the city was the site of the WWA Wakeboarding National Championship.

== Geography ==
Acworth is located in the foothills of the North Georgia mountains along the southeastern banks of Lake Acworth and Lake Allatoona on the Etowah River. It is bordered by the city of Kennesaw to the southeast and by Bartow and Cherokee counties to the north.

Interstate 75 runs through the northern part of the city in Cherokee and Bartow counties, with access from exits 277 and 278. Via I-75, downtown Atlanta is 34 mi (55 km) southeast, and Chattanooga, Tennessee, is 88 mi (142 km) northwest. U.S. Route 41 and Georgia State Route 92 also run through the city, with GA-92 leading east 12 mi (19 km) to Woodstock, and south 18 mi (29 km) to Hiram. US-41 runs to the west of the city, leading southeast 6 mi (9.7 km) to Kennesaw, Georgia, and northwest 12 mi (19 km) to Cartersville.

According to the United States Census Bureau, the city has a total area of 8.8 square miles (22.7 km^{2}), of which 8.3 square miles (21.4 km^{2}) is land and 0.54 square miles (1.4 km^{2}), or 6.05%, is water.

Unincorporated areas considered Acworth for mailing purposes extend into southeast Bartow County, southwest Cherokee County, and northeast Paulding County. Some of the incorporated portions of Acworth east of Nance Road and Acworth Due West Road have a Kennesaw mailing address.

== Demographics ==
Historical population
Census	Pop.	Note	%±
1880	633		—
1890	815		28.8%
1900	937		15.0%
1910	1,043		11.3%
1920	1,117		7.1%
1930	1,163		4.1%
1940	1,267		8.9%
1950	1,466		15.7%
1960	2,359		60.9%
1970	3,929		66.6%
1980	3,648		−7.2%
1990	4,519		23.9%
2000	13,422		197.0%
2010	20,425		52.2%
2020	22,440		9.9%
2025 (est.)	22,925	▲	2.2%
U.S. Decennial Census; 1850-1870 1870-1880; 1890-1910 1920-1930; 1940 1950 1960; 1970 1980 1990; 2000 2010 2020; 2025

=== Racial and ethnic composition ===
Acworth city, Georgia – Racial and ethnic composition Note: the US Census treats Hispanic/Latino as an ethnic category. This table excludes Latinos from the racial categories and assigns them to a separate category. Hispanics/Latinos may be of any race.
Race / Ethnicity (NH = Non-Hispanic)	Pop 1980	Pop 1990	Pop 2000	Pop 2010	Pop 2020	% 1980	% 1990	% 2000	% 2010	% 2020
White alone (NH)	3,278	4,128	10,377	11,503	11,260	89.86%	91.35%	77.31%	56.32%	50.18%
Black or African American alone (NH)	303	307	1,662	5,093	5,803	8.31%	6.79%	12.38%	24.94%	25.86%
Native American or Alaska Native alone (NH)	13	13	25	43	39	0.36%	0.29%	0.19%	0.21%	0.17%
Asian alone (NH)	0	11	307	694	920	0.00%	0.24%	2.29%	3.40%	4.10%
Native Hawaiian or Pacific Islander alone (NH)	x	x	3	9	5	x	x	0.02%	0.04%	0.02%
Other race alone (NH)	0	5	40	91	131	0.00%	0.11%	0.30%	0.45%	0.58%
Mixed race or Multiracial (NH)	x	x	196	450	1,037	x	x	1.46%	2.20%	4.62%
Hispanic or Latino (any race)	54	55	812	2,542	3,245	1.48%	1.22%	6.05%	12.45%	14.46%
Total	3,648	4,519	13,422	20,425	22,440	100.00%	100.00%	100.00%	100.00%	100.00%

=== 2020 census ===
As of the 2020 census, Acworth had a population of 22,440. The median age was 37.4 years. 22.7% of residents were under the age of 18 and 14.5% of residents were 65 years of age or older. For every 100 females there were 86.3 males, and for every 100 females age 18 and over there were 82.5 males age 18 and over.

100.0% of residents lived in urban areas, while 0.0% lived in rural areas.

There were 8,766 households in Acworth; 33.4% had children under the age of 18 living in them. Of all households, 42.7% were married-couple households, 17.2% were households with a male householder and no spouse or partner present, and 34.1% were households with a female householder and no spouse or partner present. About 28.2% of all households were made up of individuals and 12.7% had someone living alone who was 65 years of age or older. Of the total households, 5,470 were families.

There were 9,507 housing units, of which 7.8% were vacant. The homeowner vacancy rate was 1.5% and the rental vacancy rate was 12.8%.

Racial composition as of the 2020 census
Race	Number	Percent
White	11,801	52.6%
Black or African American	5,911	26.3%
American Indian and Alaska Native	149	0.7%
Asian	930	4.1%
Native Hawaiian and Other Pacific Islander	11	0.0%
Some other race	1,302	5.8%
Two or more races	2,336	10.4%
Hispanic or Latino (of any race)	3,245	14.5%

=== 2000 census ===
As of the census of 2000, there were 13,422 people, 5,194 households, and 3,589 families residing in the city. The population density was 1,896.9 inhabitants per square mile (732.4/km^{2}). There were 5,453 housing units at an average density of 770.7 per square mile (297.6/km^{2}). The racial makeup of the city was 79.7% White, 12.6% African American, 0.2% Native American, 2.3% Asian, 0.02% Pacific Islander, 3.2% from other races, and 2.00% from two or more races. Hispanic or Latino people of any race were 6.05% of the population.

There were 5,194 households, out of which 37.7% had children under the age of 18 living with them, 54.9% were married couples living together, 10.8% had a female householder with no husband present, and 30.9% were non-families. 23.5% of all households were made up of individuals, and 5.4% had someone living alone who was 65 years of age or older. The average household size was 2.58 and the average family size was 3.08.

In the city, the population was spread out, with 27.0% under the age of 18, 9.0% from 18 to 24, 41.0% from 25 to 44, 15.7% from 45 to 64, and 7.2% who were 65 years of age or older. The median age was 31 years. For every 100 females, there were 95.4 males. For every 100 females age 18 and over, there were 92.6 males.

== Government ==
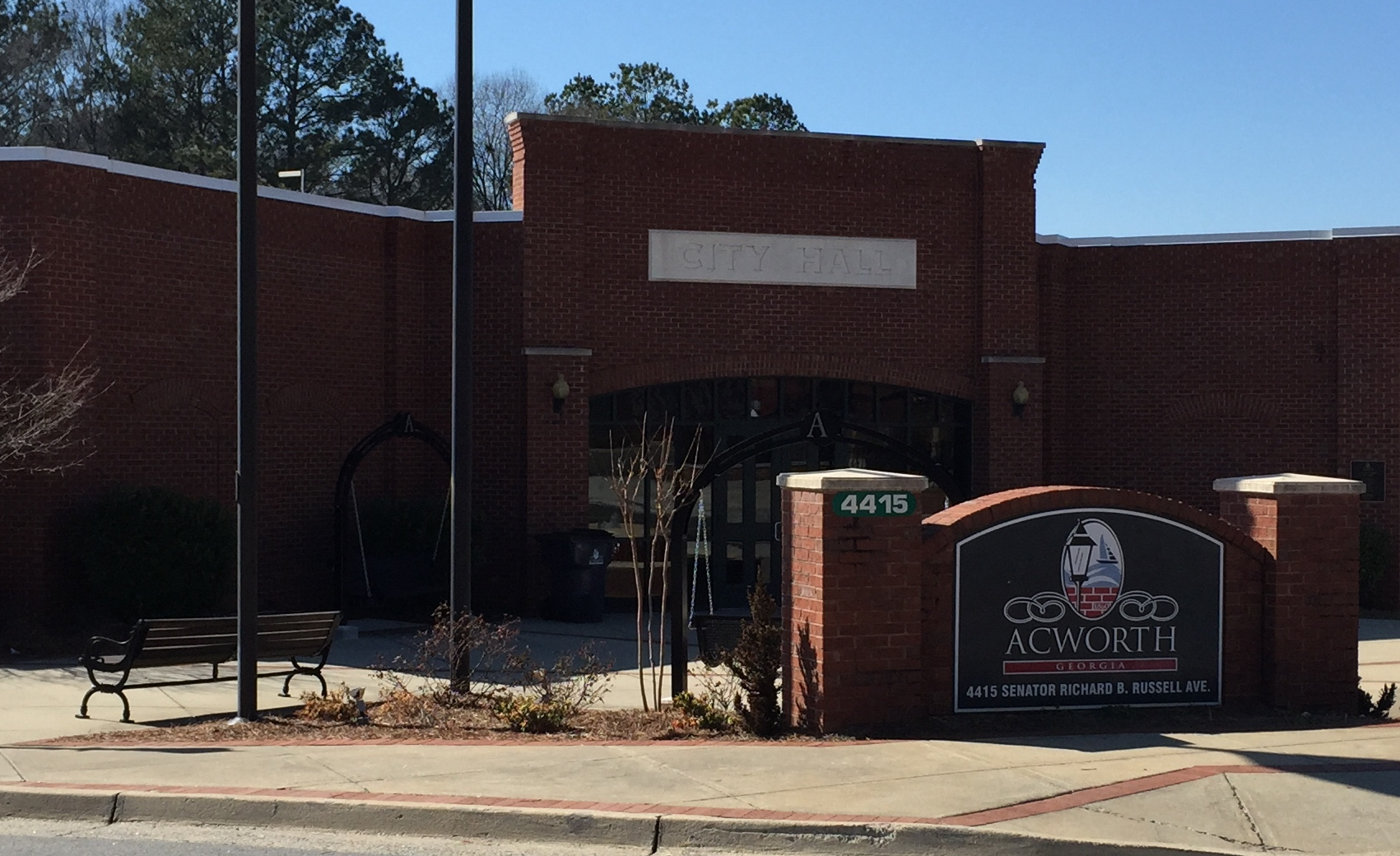
City Hall

The city is governed by a five-member Board of Aldermen, who serve staggered four-year terms. The mayor is elected to four-year terms.

An unusual ordinance once required all citizens to own a rake. This ordinance was enacted shortly after the neighboring city of Kennesaw, Georgia ordered every homeowner to own a gun in 1982. The requirement to own a rake is no longer in effect.

The city maintains ten public parks: Acworth Sports Complex, Baker Plantation, Dallas Landing, East Lakeshore, Frana Brown, Logan Farm, Newberry, Overlook, Proctor Landing, and South Shore.

== Education ==
Public education in Acworth is handled by the Cobb County School District.

Public schools include:

- Acworth Elementary School
- Baker Elementary School
- Ford Elementary School
- Frey Elementary School
- McCall Primary School
- Pickett's Mill Elementary School
- Pitner Elementary School
- Barber Middle School
- Durham Middle School
- Allatoona High School
- North Cobb High School

Private schools include:

- North Cobb Christian School

== Transportation ==
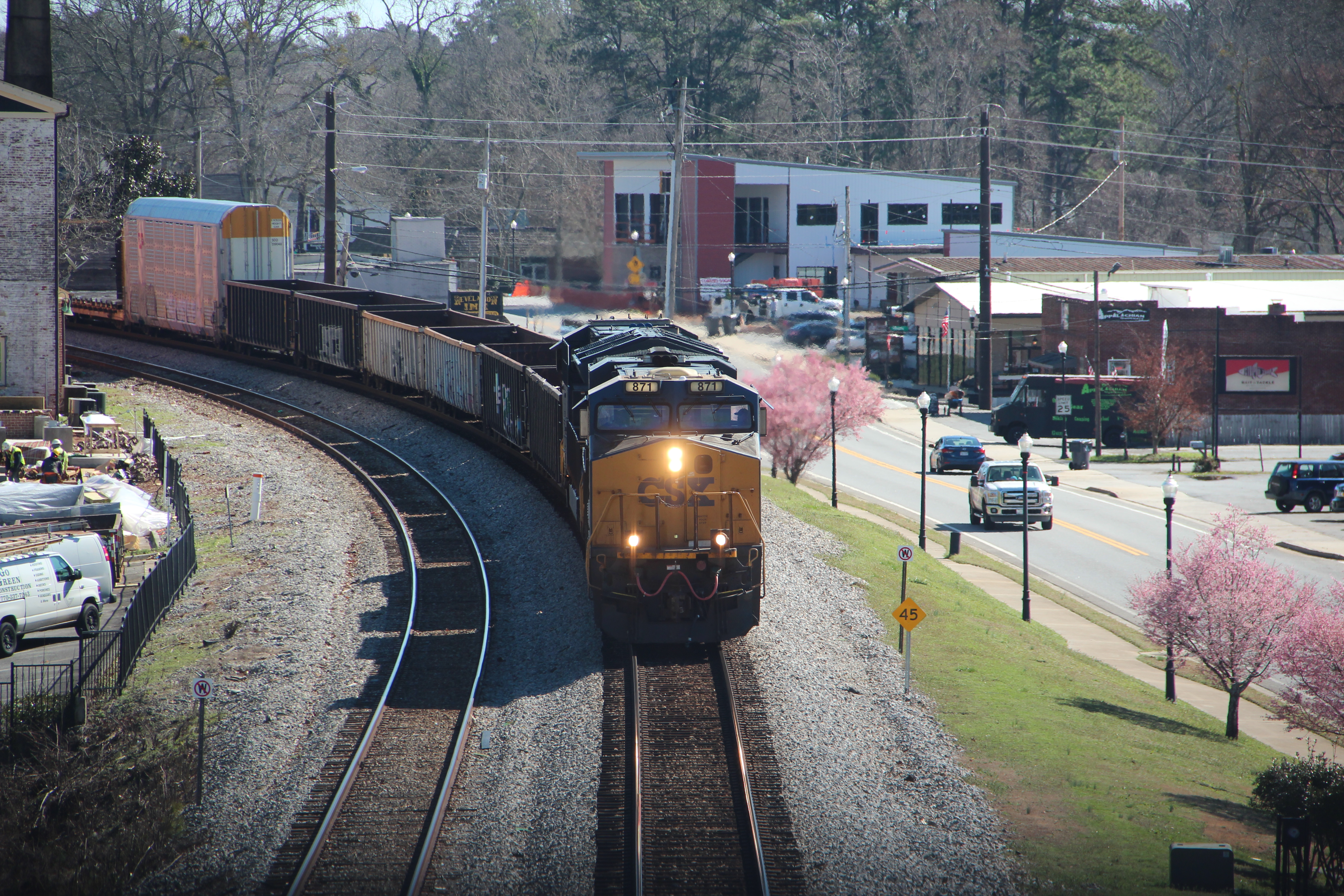
A CSX train passing through downtown Acworth

=== Major roads ===
The main route through the center of Acworth is Main Street, a two-lane road. The road enters Acworth at the southeast near its intersection with Nowlin Road, and continues on a winding, northwesterly path, exiting into unincorporated Bartow County near its intersection near Robinson Road. Generally, the roadway is designated "S. Main Street" south of the Dallas Street intersection, and "N. Main Street" north of there. The route is also locally known as "Old 41 Hwy" as it historically carried US 41. State Route 92 and Highway 41 serve the city as the only routes with federal or state designations. Interstate 75 lies just north of City limits; exits 277, 278, and the Hickory Grove Rd express exit serve the local area.

=== Pedestrians and cycling ===
- Acworth Trail
- Graves Path

== Notable people ==
- Johnny Archer, professional pool player and Billiard Congress of America Hall of Fame inductee
- Jason Bohn, professional golfer
- Angie Bowie, former actress/model and ex-wife of David Bowie
- Warren Creavalle, professional soccer player
- Robby Ginepri, former professional tennis player
- Grant Henry, artist and businessman
- Scotti Madison, former professional baseball player
- Larry Nelson, former professional golfer and World Golf Hall of Fame inductee
- Bronson Rechsteiner, professional wrestler
- Bobby Reynolds, former professional tennis player and current Auburn Tigers tennis coach
- Ranger Ross, former professional wrestler
- Clarke Schmidt, professional baseball player
- Musa Smith, former NFL running back
- Rick Steiner, former professional wrestler
- Darren Waller, NFL tight end
- Raleigh Webb, NFL player for the New England Patriots
- Aiden Zhane, RuPaul's Drag Race Season 12 contestant
