= Adjectival =

Adjectival may refer to:

- Anything related to or serving as an adjective
- Adjectival noun (Japanese)
- Adjectival demonym, an adjective used to indicate a location (e.g. Irish, Italian)
  - List of adjectival and demonymic forms of place names
  - List of adjectivals and demonyms for subcontinental regions
  - List of adjectival and demonymic forms for countries and nations
  - List of adjectivals and demonyms for cities
  - List of adjectivals and demonyms of astronomical bodies
  - List of adjectivals and demonyms for former regions
  - List of adjectival tourisms

== See also ==
- Adjective phrase
- Adjectival noun (disambiguation)
