= List of adjectival and demonymic forms of place names =

The following is a partial list of adjectival forms of place names in English and their demonymic equivalents, which denote the people or the inhabitants of these places. (Note: Demonyms are given in plural forms. Singular forms simply remove the final 's' or, in the case of -ese endings, are the same as the plural forms. The ending -men has feminine equivalent -women (e.g. an Irishman and a Scotswoman). The French terminations -ois / ais serve as both the singular and plural masculine; adding 'e' (-oise / aise) makes them singular feminine; 'es' (-oises / aises) makes them plural feminine. The Spanish termination "-o" usually denotes the masculine and is normally changed to feminine by replacing the "-o" with "-a". The plural forms are usually "-os" and "-as" respectively. Adjectives ending -ish can be used as collective demonyms (e.g. the English, the Cornish). So can those ending in -ch / -tch (e.g. the French, the Dutch) provided they are pronounced with a 'ch' sound (e.g., the adjective Czech does not qualify). Where an adjective is a link, the link is to the language or dialect of the same name.)

Many place-name adjectives and many demonyms refer also to various other things, sometimes with and sometimes without one or more additional words. (Sometimes, the use of one or more additional words is optional.) Notable examples are cheeses, cat breeds, dog breeds, and horse breeds. (See List of words derived from toponyms.)

== Continents ==
Entries in italics are continental regions (taking as reference the seven continents model).

Name	Adjective	Demonym
Afro-Eurasia	Afro-Eurasian	Afro-Eurasians
Africa	African	Africans
North Africa	North African	North Africans
Maghreb	Maghrebi	Maghrebis
Eurasia	Eurasian	Eurasians
Asia	Asian	Asians
Middle East	Middle Eastern	Middle Easterners
Europe	European	Europeans
Americas	American	Americans
North America	North American	North Americans
Caribbean	Caribbean	Caribbeans
West Indies	West Indian	West Indians
Central America	Central American	Central Americans
Northern America	Northern American	Northern Americans
South America	South American	South Americans
Antarctica	Antarctic	Antarcticans
Oceania	Oceanian	Oceanians
Australasia	Australasian	Australasians
Australia^{a}	Australian^{a}	Australians^{a}
Zealandia	Zealandian	Zealandians
Pacific Islands	Pacific Islands	Pacific Islanders
^{a}Usually used to identify specifically the Commonwealth of Australia or its people.

== States, provinces, regions and territories ==
=== Australian states and territories ===
State/territory	Adjective	Demonym	
State/territory	Adjective		colloquial
Australian Capital Territory	Canberran	Canberrans	"Inlanders", "Round Abouters", "Canberries", "Pollies", "Ken Behrens"
New South Wales	New South Welsh	New South Welshmen	"Waratahs", "Cockroaches", "Blues"
Northern Territory	Northern Territory	Northern Territorians, Territorians	"Top Enders", "Ex-pats"
Queensland	Queensland	Queenslanders	"Banana Benders", "Cane Toads", "Maroons"
South Australia	South Australian	South Australians	"Crow Eaters"
Tasmania	Tasmanian	Tasmanians	"Apple Eaters", "Taswegians", "Tazzies"
Victoria	Victorian	Victorians	"Vics", "Mexicans"
Western Australia	Western Australian	Western Australians	"Sandgropers", "Westralians"

=== Brazilian states ===
State	Adjective/Demonym
Acre (AC)	Acrean
Alagoas (AL)	Alagoan
Amapá (AP)	Amapaense
Amazonas (AM)	Amazonense
Bahia (BA)	Bahian
Ceará (CE)	Cearense
Espírito Santo (ES)	Capixaba or Espiritossantense
Federal District (DF)	Brasiliense
Goiás (GO)	Goian
Maranhão (MA)	Maranhense
Mato Grosso (MG)	Matogrossense
Mato Grosso do Sul (MS)	Sul-matogrossense
Minas Gerais (MG)	Mineiran
Pará (PA)	Paraense
Paraíba (PB)	Paraiban
Paraná (PR)	Paranaense
Pernambuco (PE)	Pernambucan
Piauí (PI)	Piauiense
Rio de Janeiro (RJ)	Fluminense
Rio Grande do Norte (RN)	Potiguar or Norte-riograndense
Rio Grande do Sul (RS)	Gaúcho or Sul-riograndense
Rondônia (RO)	Rondonian or Rondoniense
Roraima (RR)	Roraimense
Santa Catarina (SC)	Catarinense
São Paulo (SP)	Paulista
Sergipe (SE)	Sergipan
Tocantins (TO)	Tocantinense

=== Canadian provinces and territories ===
Province or Territory	Adjective	Demonym	
Province or Territory	Adjective		Colloquial
Alberta (Province)	Albertan	Albertans	'Bertans
British Columbia (Province)	British Columbian, BC	British Columbians	B.C.ers
Manitoba (Province)	Manitoban	Manitobans; French: Manitobains m., Manitobaines f.	Tobans
New Brunswick (Province)	New Brunswick	New Brunswickers; French: Néo-Brunswickois m., Néo-Brunswickoises f.	Herring Chokers
Newfoundland and Labrador (Province)	Newfoundland and Labrador	Newfoundlanders, Labradorians; French: Terre-Neuviens m., Terre-Neuviennes f.	Newfies/Newfs
Northwest Territories (Territory)	Northwest Territorian, NWT (also N.W.T.)	Northwest Territorians	
Nova Scotia (Province)	Nova Scotian	Nova Scotians; French: Néo-Écossais m., Néo-Écossaises f.	Bluenoses, Bluenosers
Nunavut (Territory)	Nunavut	Nunavummiut (Nunavummiuq sing.)	
Ontario (Province)	Ontario	Ontarians; French: Ontariens m., Ontariennes f.	
Prince Edward Island (Province)	Prince Edward Island, PEI, Island	Prince Edward Islanders, Islanders; French: Prince-Édouardiens	
Quebec (Province)	Quebec; French: québécois m., québécoise f.	Quebecers, Quebeckers, Québécois, Québécoise; French: Québécois m., Québécoises f.	French: habitants, canadiens, canadien-francais
Saskatchewan (Province)	Saskatchewan	Saskatchewanians	Flat-landers
Yukon (Territory)	Yukon	Yukoners	Sourdoughs

=== Federated states and other territories of Germany ===
State/territory	Adjective	Demonym	
State/territory	Adjective		colloquial
Angria (North German area and historical region)	Angrian	Angrians	
Baden-Württemberg (federated state): Baden; Württemberg; Hohenzollern	Badisch; Württembergisch; Hohenzollerisch	Badener; Württembergers	Badenser; Swabians (Schwaben)
Bavaria (federated state)	Bavarian	Bavarians	
Berlin (federated state)	Berliner	Berliners	
Brandenburg (federated state)	Brandenburgish	Brandenburgers	
Eastphalia (North German area and historical region)	Eastphalian	Eastphalians	
Franconia	Franconian	Franconians	
Free Hanseatic City of Bremen			
Free and Hanseatic City of Hamburg	Hamburgish	Hamburgians	Hamburgers
Hannover (ancient German state)	Hanoverian	Hanoverians	Hannoveraners
Hesse (federated state)	Hessian	Hessians	
Lower Saxony (federated state)	Lower Saxon	Lower Saxons	
Mecklenburg-Western Pomerania (federated state): Mecklenburg; Western Pomerania	Mecklenburgish; Pomeranian	Mecklenburger; Pomeranian	
North Rhine-Westphalia (federated state): North Rhine; Westphalia	North Rhine - Westphalian; Rhenish; Westphalian	North Rhine - Westphalians; Rhinelanders; Westphalian	
Pomerania (ancient German territory)	Pomeranian	Pomeranians	
Prussia (ancient German state)	Prussian	Prussians	
Rhineland (area)	Rhenish	Rhinelanders	
Rhineland-Palatinate (federated state): Rhineland; Palatinate	Rhenish; Palatine	Rhinelanders; Palatines	Pfälzer
Saarland (federated state)	Saarlander; Saar	Saarlanders; Saars	
Saxony (federated state)	Saxon	Saxons	
Saxony-Anhalt (federated state): Saxony; Anhalt	Saxon; Anhaltish	Saxons; Anhalters	
Silesia (ancient German territory)	Silesian	Silesians	
Schleswig-Holstein (federated state): Schleswig; Holstein	Schleswigish; Holsteinish	Schleswigers; Holsteiners	
Swabia (South German area and cultural, geographic, historical, and linguistic region)	Swabian	Swabians	
Thuringia (federated state)	Thuringian	Thuringians	
Westphalia (North German area and historical region)	Westphalian	Westphalians	

=== Indian states and territories ===
State or territory	Adjective	Demonym	
State or territory	Adjective		colloquial
Andaman and Nicobar Islands	Andamanese; Nicobarese	Andamanese; Nicobarese	
Andhra Pradesh	Andhrulu	Andhraites, Andhrites, Andhra Pradeshis, Andhrulu	Teluguvaaru
Arunachal Pradesh	Arunachali	Arunachalis	
Assam	Assamese	Assamese	
Bihar	Bihari	Biharis	
Chandigarh	Chandigarhi	Chandigarhis	
Chhattisgarh	Chhattisgarhi	Chhattisgarhis	
Dadra and Nagar Haveli and Daman and Diu	Dadran; Nagar Havelian; Damanese; Diuese	Dadran; Nagar Havelian; Damanese; Diuese	
Delhi	Delhiite, Delhian	Delhiites, Delhians	
Goa	Goan,	Goans, Goenkars	
Gujarat	Gujarati	Gujaratis	
Haryana	Haryanvi	Haryanvis	–
Himachal Pradesh	Himachali	Himachalis	
Jammu and Kashmir	Jammu; Kashmiri	Jammuite; Kashmiris	–
Jharkhand	Jharkhandi	Jharkhandis	
Karnataka	Karnatakan, Canarese	Karnatakans, Canarese, Kannadiga	Kannadiga
Kerala	Keralite	Keralites, Malayalis	Malayali
Ladakh	Ladakhi	Ladakhi	
Lakshadweep (Laccadives)	Laccadivian	Laccadivians	
Madhya Pradesh	Madhya Pradeshi	Madhya Pradeshis	
Maharashtra	Maharashtrian	Maharashtrians	Marathi
Manipur	Manipuri	Manipuris	Meiteis
Meghalaya	Meghalayan	Meghalayans	
Mizoram	Mizo	Mizos	
Nagaland	Naga, Nagalandese	Nagas, Nagalanders	
Odisha	Odia (Odia) [of the people] Odishan (Orissan) [of the state] Odissi (Orissi)	Odias (Odias); Odishans (Orissans)	–
Puducherry (formerly Pondicherry)	Pondicherrian	Pondicherrians	–
Punjab	Punjabi	Punjabis	
Rajasthan	Rajasthani	Rajasthanis	
Sikkim	Sikkimese	Sikkimese	
Tamil Nadu	Tamil, Tamilian	Tamils, Tamilians	Tamizhan
Telangana	Telanganite	Telanganites	Teluguvaaru
Tripura	Tripuri, Tripuran	Tripuris, Tripurans	
Uttar Pradesh	Uttar Pradeshi	Uttar Pradeshis	
Uttarakhand	Uttarakhandi	Uttarakhandis	
West Bengal	(West) Bengali, (West) Bengalese (archaic)	(West) Bengalis	

=== Bangladeshi divisions ===
Division	Adjective	Demonym	
Division	Adjective		colloquial
Barisal Division	Barisali	Barisali (Borishali)	Barisailla (Borishailla)
Chittagong Division	Chittagonian	Chãtgaiya (Satgaiya)	Chittagainga (Sitainga)
Dhaka Division	Dhakai	Dhakaiya	Dhakaiya
Khulna Division	Khulnaiya	Khulnaiya	Khulnaiya
Mymensingh Division	Mymensinghiya	Mymensinghi	Mymensinghiya
Rajshahi Division	Rajshahiya	Rajshahiya (Rajshahiyo)	Rajshahiya
Rangpur Division	Rangpuri	Rangpuri (Rongpuri)	Rangpuri
Sylhet Division	Sylheti	Sylheti (Sileti)	Siloti

=== Malaysian states and territories ===
State / Territory	Adjective	Demonym	
State / Territory	Adjective		colloquial
Johor	Johorean	Johoreans	Southerners
Kedah	Kedahan	Kedahans	Northerners
Kelantan	Kelantanese	Kelantanese	East Coasters
Kuala Lumpur	Kuala Lumpurian	Kuala Lumpurians	Federal Territorians, KL-ites
Labuan	Labuanese	Labuanese	Federal Territorians
Malacca	Malaccan, Melakan	Malaccans, Melakans	
Negeri Sembilan	Negeri Sembilanese	Negeri Sembilanese	Negrians
Pahang	Pahangite	Pahangites	East Coasters
Penang	Penangite	Penangites	
Perak	Perakian	Perakians	
Perlis	Perlisian	Perlisians	
Putrajaya	Putrajayan	Putrajayans	Federal Territorians
Sabah	Sabahan	Sabahans	Borneans
Sarawak	Sarawakian	Sarawakians	Borneans
Selangor	Selangorean	Selangoreans	
Terengganu	Terengganuan	Terengganuans	East Coasters
West Malaysia	West Malaysian	West Malaysians	Malayans
East Malaysia	East Malaysian	East Malaysians	Borneans

=== States of Mexico ===
Federal entity	Adjective	Demonym	
Federal entity	Adjective		colloquial
Aguascalientes	Hydrocalid	Hidrocálido/-a, aguascalentense	
Baja California	Lower Californian	Bajacaliforniano/-a	
Baja California Sur	South Lower Californian	Sudcaliforniano/-a	
Campeche	Campechan	Campechano/-a	
Chiapas	Chiapan	Chiapaneco/-a	
Chihuahua	Chihuahuan	Chihuahuense	"Norteño/a"
Coahuila de Zaragoza	Coahuilan	Coahuilense	
Colima	Colimean	Colimense	
Durango	Durangolese	Duranguense	
Guanajuato	Guanajuatean	Guanajuatense	
Guerrero	Guerreran	Guerrerense	
Hidalgo	Hidalgolese	Hidalguense	
Jalisco	Jaliscan	Jalisciense	"Jalisquillo" "Tapatio/ Tapatia"
State of Mexico	Mexican	Mexiquense	
Ciudad de México (México D.F.) (México Distrito Federal) (Mexico City)		Mexiqueño/-a, defeño/-a	"Chilango"
Michoacán	Michoacanese	Michoacano/-a	
Morelos	Morelese	Morelense	
Nayarit	Nayarita	Nayarita	
Nuevo León	New Leonese	Neoleonés, neoleonense	"Regio/a"
Oaxaca	Oaxacan	Oaxaqueño/-a	"Oaxaco"
Puebla	Pueblan/Poblano	Poblano/-a	
Querétaro	Queretan	Queretano/-a	
Quintana Roo	Quintanaroan	Quintanarroense	
San Luis Potosí	Potosinian	Potosino/-a	
Sinaloa	Sinaloan	Sinaloense	
Sonora	Sonoran	Sonorense	
Tabasco	Tabascan	Tabasqueño/-a	
Tamaulipas	Tamaulipan	Tamaulipeco/-a	
Tlaxcala	Tlaxcaltheque	Tlaxcalteco/ -a	
Veracruz	Veracruzan	Veracruzano/-a	"Jarocho/a"
Yucatán	Yucatec/Yucatecan	Yucateco/-a	"Costeño/a"
Zacatecas	Zacatecan	Zacatecano/-a	
1. Capitalino is often used to refer to people from Mexico City; however, capitalino can be used to refer to people from any state capital. "Defeño" and "Chilango" are listed by the Royal Spanish Academy

=== Regions of New Zealand ===
Region/Island	Adjective	Demonym	
Region/Island	Adjective		colloquial
Auckland Region	Auckland	Aucklanders	"Jafas"
Bay of Plenty Region	Bay of Plenty	Bay of Plentiers	
Canterbury Region	Canterbury	Cantabrians	"Cantabs"
Gisborne Region	Gisborne, East Coast	Gisbornians, East Coasters	
Hawke's Bay Region	Hawke's Bay	Hawke's Bayers	"Baysiders"
Manawatū-Whanganui Region	Manawatū-Whanganui, Manawatu, Wanganui	Manawatū-Whanganuians, Manawatuans, Whanganuians	
Marlborough Region	Marlborough	Marlburians	
Nelson Region	Nelsonian	Nelsonians	
Northland Region	Northland	Northlanders	
Otago Region	Otago	Otagoites, Otagoans, Otagonians	
Southland Region	Southland	Southlanders	
Taranaki Region	Taranaki	Taranakians	"'Nakians"
Tasman Region	Tasman	Tasmanites	
Waikato Region	Waikato	Waikatoans	"Mooloos"
Wellington Region	Wellington, Wellingtonian	Wellingtonians	
West Coast Region	West Coast	West Coasters|	"Coasters"
North Island	North Island	North Islanders	
South Island	South Island / Mainland	South Islanders	"Mainlanders"
Stewart Island	Stewart Island, Rakiuran	Stewart Islanders, Rakiurans	
Chatham Islands	Chatham	Chatham Islanders	

=== Philippine provinces ===
Province	Adjective	Demonym	
Province	Adjective		colloquial
Abra	Abrenian	Abreño/-a	
Agusan del Norte	North Agusanian	Agusanon	
Agusan del Sur	South Agusanian	Agusanon	
Aklan	Aklan, Aklanon, Aklanese	Aklanon	Akeanon*
Albay	Albay, Albayan, Albayano	Albayano/-a	
Antique	Antiquenian, Antiqueño	Antiqueño/-a	
Apayao	Apayao, Apayaonian	Apayao	
Aurora	Auroran	Auroran taga-Aurora	
Basilan	Basilan, Basileño, Basilanese	Basileño/-a	
Bataan	Bataan, Bataanese, Bataeño	Bataeño/-a, taga-Bataan	
Batanes	Batanic, Ivatan, Ivatanic	Ivatan	
Batangas	Batangan, Batangueño	Batangueño/-a, taga-Batangas	Batangasin in Quezon
Benguet	Benguet, Benguetian	Benguet	Igorot ^{1}
Biliran	Biliran, Biliranian	Biliranon	
Bohol	Boholan, Boholano	Boholano/-a	Bol-anon*
Bukidnon	Bukidnon	Bukidnon	
Bulacan	Bulacan, Bulaqueño, Bulacanese	Bulaqueño/-a, taga-Bulacan	
Cagayan	Cagayan, Cagayano, Cagayanese	Cagayano/-a	
Camarines Norte	North Camarinean, Camarinense	Camarinense	
Camarines Sur	South Camarinean, Camarinense	Camarinense	
Camiguin	Camiguin	Camiguinon	
Capiz	Capizian, Capizeño	Capizeño/-a	Capiznon
Catanduanes	Catanduanean, Catandueño/-a	Catandunganon	
Cavite	Cavitenian, Caviteño	Caviteño/-a, taga-Cavite	
Cebu	Cebu, Cebuan, Cebuano	Cebuano/-a	Sugbuanon*
Cotabato	Cotabato, Cotabatan, Cotabateño	Cotabateño/-a	
Davao de Oro	Golden Davao, Davaoeño, Orocanon, Oroqueño	Davaoeño/-a	
Davao del Norte	North Davao, Davaoeño	Davaoeño/-a	
Davao del Sur	South Davao, Davaoeño	Davaoeño/-a	
Davao Occidental	Western Davao, Davaoeño	Davaoeño/-a	
Davao Oriental	Eastern Davao, Davaoeño	Davaoeño/-a	
Dinagat Islands	Dinagat, Dinagatan	Dinagatnon	
Eastern Samar	Eastern Samarian, Samareño	Eastern Samareño/-a	Samarnon, Estehanon
Guimaras	Guimarasian	Guimarasnon	
Ifugao	Ifugao	Ifugao	Igorot
Ilocos Norte	North Ilocos, Ilocano	Ilocano/-a	
Ilocos Sur	South Ilocos, Ilocano	Ilocano/-a	
Iloilo	Iloilo, Iloiloan, Ilonggo	Ilonggo/-a	
Isabela	Isabelan	Isabeleño/-a	
Kalinga	Kalingan	Kalinga	
La Union	La Unionian, La Ueño	La Ueño/-a	
Laguna	Lagunian, Laguneño, Lagunense	Laguneño/-a, Lagunense, taga-Laguna	Lagunahin* in Southeastern part of Laguna
Lanao del Norte	North Lanao	Lanaonon	
Lanao del Sur	South Lanao, Maranao	Maranao	
Leyte	Leytenian	Leyteño/-a	
Maguindanao del Norte	North Maguindanaoan	Norte Maguindanao	
Maguindanao del Sur	South Maguindanaoan	Maguindanao	
Manila	Manilan, Manileño	Manileño/-a, taga-Maynila	Maynilain in Quezon
Marinduque	Marinduquenian, Marinduqueño	Marinduqueño/-a, Marindukanon, Marinduquehin, taga-Marinduque	
Masbate	Masbatenian, Masbateño	Masbateño/-a	
Misamis Occidental	West Misamis	Occidental Misamisnon	
Misamis Oriental	East Misamis	Oriental Misamisnon	
Mountain Province	Mountaineers	Bontoc	Igorot
Negros Occidental	West Negros, Negrense	Occidental Negrense	Negrosanon
Negros Oriental	East Negros, Negrense	Oriental Negrense	Negrosanon
Northern Samar	North Samarian, Samareño	Norte Samareño/-a	Nortehanon*
Nueva Ecija	Nueva Ecijan, Novo Ecijano	Novo Ecijano/-a, taga-Nueva Ecija	
Nueva Vizcaya	Nueva Vizcayan, Novo Vizcayano	Novo Vizcayano/-a	
Occidental Mindoro	West Mindorenian, Mindoreño	Occidental Mindoreño/-a, taga-Occidental Mindoro	
Oriental Mindoro	East Mindorenian, Mindoreño	Oriental Mindoreño/-a, taga-Oriental Mindoro	
Palawan	Palawan, Palaweño	Palaweño/-a	
Pampanga	Pampangan, Pampangueño	Pampangueño/-a	Kapampangan*
Pangasinan	Pangasinan,	Pangasinense	Pangalatok ^{2}
Quezon	Quezonian, Quezonin	Quezonian, Quezonin, taga-Quezon, Tayabasin,^{3} Tayabeño/-a,^{3} Tayabense ^{3}	
Quirino	Quirinian	Quirinian	
Rizal	Rizalian, Rizaleño	Rizaleño/-a, taga-Rizal	
Romblon	Romblonian	Romblomanon	
Samar	West Samarian, Samareño	Samareño/-a	Samarnon, Westehanon
Sarangani	Sarangan	Sarangan	
Siquijor	Siquijorian	Siquijornon, Siquijodnon	
Sorsogon	Sorsogonian, Sorsogueño	Sorsogueño/-a	Sorsoganon
South Cotabato	South Cotabatan, South Cotabateño	South Cotabateño/-a	
Southern Leyte	Southern Leytenian	Southern Leyteño/-a	
Sultan Kudarat	Sultan Kudaratenian, Sultan Kudarateño	Sultan Kudarateño/-a	
Sulu	Sulu, Suluan, Suluano	Suluano/-a	
Surigao del Norte	North Surigaoan	Surigaonon	
Surigao del Sur	South Surigaoan	Surigaonon	
Tarlac	Tarlaquenian, Tarlaqueño	Tarlaqueño/-a, Tarlakin, taga-Tarlac	
Tawi-Tawi	Tawi-Tawian	Tawi-Tawian	
Zambales	Zambalean, Zambaleño	Zambaleño/-a	Sambal
Zamboanga del Norte	North Zamboangan, Zamboangueño	Norte Zamboangueño/-a	
Zamboanga del Sur	South Zamboangan, Zamboangueño	Zamboangueño/-a	Chavacano*
Zamboanga Sibugay	Sibugay	Sibugaynon, Zamboangueño/-a	
1. Sometimes discriminatory or derogatory.; 2. Considered derogatory.; 3. From the province's former name, Tayabas.

=== Regions in Greco-Roman antiquity ===
Regions tracing their origins (or otherwise referenced) in Greco-Roman antiquity [in cases where ancient regions are extant, this table is limited to cases where the present-day regional names retain their original/ancient form].

(References: Herodotus' "Histories"; Thucydides' "Peloponnesian War"; Pausanias' "Description of Greece"; Lemprière's Bibliotheca Classica; Leverett's 1838 edition of the "Lexicon of the Latin Language"; Freeman's "The History of Sicily..."; et al.)

Name	Adjective	Demonym
Name	Adjective	colloquial
Acarnania	Acarnanian	Acarnanians
Achaea	Achaean	Achaeans
Aegina	Aeginetan	Aeginetans
Aethaea	Aethaean	Aethaeans
Aetolia	Aetolian	Aetolians
Andalusia	Andalusian	Andalusians
Apulia	Apulian	Apulians
Aquitania	Aquitanian	Aquitanians
Arcadia	Arcadian	Arcadians
Argos	Argive	Argives
Arretium	Arretine	Arretines
Athens	Athenian	Athenians
Bactria, Bactriana	Bactrian	Bactrians
Bavaria	Bavarian	Bavarians
Boeotia	Boeotian, Beotian	Boeotians, Beotians
Boiohaemum	Boius	Boii
Bosporus, Bosphorus	Bosporan, Bosphoran	Bosporans, Bosphorans
Britannia	Britannic	Britannics
Bruttium	(Bruttus ?), Bruttian	Brutti, Bruttians
Byzantium	Byzantine	Byzantines
Calabria	Calabrian	Calabrians
Caledonia	Caledonian	Caledonians
Campania	Campanian	Campanians
Cantabria	Cantabrian	Cantabrians
Caria	Carian	Carians
Carthage	Carthaginian	Carthaginians
Carystus	Carystian	Carystians
Catalonia	Catalan, Catalonian	Catalans, Catalonians
Cephalonia	Cephalonian	Cephalonians
Chalcis	Chalcidian	Chalcidians
Chios	Chiot	Chiots
Colchis	Colchian	Colchians
Colossae	Colossian	Colossians
Consentia	Consentian	Consentians
Corcyra	Corcyrean	Corcyreans
Corsica	Corsican	Corsicans
Crete	Cretan	Cretans
Croton	Crotonian	Crotonians
Cyclades	Cycladian	Cycladians
Cyprus	Cypriot, Cypriote	Cypriots, Cypriotes
Cyrenaica	Cyrenaic	Cyrenaics
Cyrene	Cyrenian	Cyrenians
Dacia	Dacian	Dacians
Dalmatia	Dalmatian	Dalmatians
Delos	Delian	Delians
Dodecanese	Dodecanesian	Dodecanesians
Edonia	Edonian	Edonians
Egesta	Egestan	Egestans
Eleusina or Eleusis	Eleusian, Eleusinian	Eleusians, Eleusinians
Elis or Eleia	Elian	Elians
Ephesus	Ephesian	Ephesians
Epidamnus or Epidamnos	Epidamnian	Epidamnians
Epidaurus	Epidaurian	Epidaurians
Epirus	Epirote	Epirotes
Eretria	Eretrian	Eretrians
Etruria	Etrurian, Etruscan	Etruscans
Euboea	Euboean	Euboeans
Galatia	Galatian	Galatians
Gallaecia	Gallaecus	Gallaeci
Gallia or Gaul	Gaulish	Gauls
Germania	Germanic, Germanus	Germanic, Germani
Hibernia	Hibernian	Hibernians
Iberia	Iberian	Iberians
Illyria	Illyrian	Illyrians
Ionia	Ionian	Ionians
Kalymnos	Kalymnian	Kalymnians
Kaulonia	Kaulonian	Kaulonians
Knossos	Knossian	Knossians
Lakedaimon/ia or Lakedaemon/ia	Lakedaimonian or Lakedaemonian	Lakedaimonians or Lakedaemonians
Larissa	Larissan	Larissans
Latium	Latin	Latins
Leontini, Leontium	Leontinian	Leontinians
Lesbos	Lesbian	Lesbians
Liburnia	Liburnian	Liburnians
Locris	Locrian	Locrians
Lucania	Lucanian	Lucanians
Lusitania	Lusitanian	Lusitanians
Lydia	Lydian	Lydians
Macedonia	Macedonian	Macedonians
Maeonia	Maeonian	Maeonians
Mantineia	Mantinean	Mantineans
Marathon	Marathonian	Marathonians
Mauretania	Mauri	Mauretanians
Media	Median	Medes, Medians
Megara	Megarian	Megarians
Melite	Melitian	Melitians
Melos	Melian	Melians
Mesopotamia	Mesopotamian	Mesopotamians
Messenia	Messenian	Messenians
Miletus	Milesian	Milesians
Mithymna or Methymna	Methymnian	Methymnians
Moravia	Moravian	Moravians
Mycenae	Mycenaean	Mycenaeans
Mytilene	Mytilenean	Mytileneans
Naupactus or Nafpaktos	Naupactian	Naupactians
Naxos	Naxian	Naxians
Nisyros	Nisyrian	Nisyrians
Numidia	Numidian	Numidians
Oea	Oean	Oeans
Olympia	Olympian	Olympians
Oiniades, Oiniadai	Oiniadan	Oiniadans
Orkney Islands	Orcadian	Orcadians
Paeonia or Paionia	Paeonian	Paeonians
Pamphylia	Pamphylian	Pamphylians
Paros	Parian	Parians
Patmos	Patmian	Patmians
Peloponnese	Peloponnesian	Peloponnesians
Pergamum	Pergamian	Pergamians
Persia	Persian	Persians
Philippi	Philippian	Philippians
Phlius	Phliasian	Phliasians
Phocis	Phocian	Phocians
Phoenicia	Phoenician	Phoenicians
Phrygia	Phrygian	Phrygians
Pisidia	Pisidian	Pisidians
Pontus	Pontian	Pontians
Pylos	Pylosian	Pylosians
Rhegion	Rhegian, Rhegine	Rhegians, Rhegines
Rhodes	Rhodian	Rhodians
Rhithymna, Rhithymnia, Rithymna	Rhithymnian	Rhithymnians
Rome	Roman	Romans
Sabinum	Sabine	Sabines
Salamis	Salaminian	Salaminians
Samnium	Samnite	Samnites
Samos	Samian	Samians
Sardinia	Sardinian, Sardi	Sardinians, Sardi
Sardis	Sardianus, Sardian	Sardiani, Sardians
Sarmatia	Sarmatian, Sarmata, or Sauromata	Sarmatians, Sarmatae, or Sauromatae
Scythia	Scytha, Scythian	Scythae, Scythians
Serrae, Serrhae	Serrean	Serreans
Serica	Sere	Seres
Sicily	Sicilian	Sicilians
Sicyon	Sicyonian	Sicyonian
Sidon, or Saïda	Sidonian	Sidonians
Silesia	Silesian	Silesians
Skopelos	Skopelitan	Skopelitans
Sparta	Spartan	Spartans
Suebia	Suebius	Suebi
Symi	Symian	Symians
Syracuse	Syracusan	Syracusans
Taras, Tarentum	Tarentine, Tarentumian	Tarentines, Tarentumians
Tegea	Tegean	Tegeans
Tenedos	Tenedian	Tenedians
Tenedos	Tenedian	Tenedians
Thasos	Thasian	Thasians
Thebes	Theban	Thebans
Thespis	Thespian	Thespians
Thessaly	Thessalian	Thessalians
Thrace	Thracian	Thracians
Thria	Thriasian	Thriasians
Thuria	Thuriat	Thuriats
Thurii	Thurian	Thurians
Thynia	Thynian	Thynians
Trichonos	Trichonian	Trichonians
Troezen	Troezenian	Troezenians
Troy	Trojan	Trojans
Umbria	Umbrian	Umbrians
Xanthi	Xanthian	Xanthians
Zakynthos	Zakynthian	Zakynthians

=== Other former nations and regions ===
Ancient civilizations, former colonies, renamed countries and regions, annexations, secessions, etc. (other than Greco-Roman, which see above).

=== Fictional regions ===
Name	Adjective	Demonym
Atlantis	Atlantean, Atlantine	Atlanteans, Atlantans
Aloria	Alorn	Alorns
Andor	Andorian	Andorians
Ankh-Morpork	Ankh-Morporkian, Morporkian	Ankh-Morporkians, Morporkians
Attilan		Inhumans
Blefuscu	Blefuscudian	Blefuscudians
Borduria	Bordurian	Bordurians
Brobdingnag	Brobdingnagian	Brobdingnagians
Laputa	Laputian	Laputans
Lilliput	Lilliputian	Lilliputians
Cadia	Cadian	Cadians
Cardassia Prime	Cardassian	Cardassians
Bajor	Bajoran	Bajorans, Bajora
Dorne	Dornish	Dornish
Ferenginar	Ferengi	Ferengi
Fontaine	Fontainian	Fontainians
Gallifrey	Gallifreyan	Gallifreyans
Genosha	Genoshan	Genoshans
Hyrule	Hylian	Hylians
Inazuma	Inazuman	Inazumans
Islandia	Islandian	Islandians
Khaenri'ah		Khaenri'ahns
Krypton	Kryptonian	Kryptonians
Latveria	Latverian	Latverians
Luggnagg		Luggnaggians
Mondas	Mondasian	Mondasians
Mondstadt		Mondstadters
Narnia	Narnian	Narnians
Natlan		Natlanese
Numenor	Numenorean	Numenoreans, Dunedan (sg), Dunedain (pl)
Oz	Ozian	Ozite
Poictesme		Poictoumois
Qo'noS	Klingon	Klingons
Remus	Reman	Remans
Rohan	Rohirric	Rohirrim
Romulus	Romulan	Romulans
Skaro	Skaroene, Skarosian	Skarosians
Sodor	Sudrian	Sudrians
Skyrim	Nordic, Norse	Nords
Snezhnaya	Snezhnayan	Snezhnayans
Sontar	Sontaran	Sontarans
Syldavia	Syldavian	Syldavians
Utopia	Utopian	Utopians
Wakanda	Wakandan	Wakandans
Westeros	Westerosi	Westerosi
Vulcan	Vulcan, Vulcanian	Vulcans

== See also ==
- Demonym
  - List of adjectival and demonymic forms of place names
    - List of adjectivals and demonyms for astronomical bodies
    - List of adjectivals and demonyms for continental regions
      - List of adjectivals and demonyms for subcontinental regions
    - List of adjectival and demonymic forms for countries and nations
      - List of adjectivals and demonyms for Australia
      - List of adjectivals and demonyms for Canada
      - List of adjectivals and demonyms for India
      - List of adjectivals and demonyms for Malaysia
      - List of adjectivals and demonyms for Mexico
      - List of adjectivals and demonyms for New Zealand
      - List of adjectivals and demonyms for the Philippines
      - List of adjectivals and demonyms for the United States
    - List of adjectivals and demonyms for cities
    - List of adjectivals and demonyms for former regions
      - List of adjectivals and demonyms for Greco-Roman antiquity
    - List of adjectivals and demonyms for fictional regions
