= Adjectival noun =

Adjectival noun may refer to:

- Adjectival noun (Japanese), also called adjectival or na-adjective
- Noun adjunct, a noun that qualifies another noun, like college in college student
- Nominalized adjective, an adjective which has come to function as a noun, as in the rich and the poor

== See also ==
- Adjective
- Noun (disambiguation)
