= List of adjectivals and demonyms for subcontinental regions =

The following is a list of adjectival forms of subcontinental regions in English and their demonymic equivalents, which denote the people or the inhabitants of these subcontinental regions.

Note: Demonyms are given in plural forms. Singular forms simply remove the final 's' or, in the case of -ese endings, are the same as the plural forms. The ending -men has feminine equivalent -women (e.g. an Irishman and a Scotswoman). The French terminations -ois / ais serve as both the singular and plural masculine; adding 'e' (-oise / aise) makes them singular feminine; 'es' (-oises / aises) makes them plural feminine. The Spanish termination "-o" usually denotes the masculine and is normally changed to feminine by dropping the "-o" and adding "-a". The plural forms are usually "-os" and "-as" respectively.

Adjectives ending -ish can be used as collective demonyms (e.g. the English, the Cornish). So can those ending in -ch / -tch (e.g. the French, the Dutch) provided they are pronounced with a 'ch' sound (e.g. the adjective Czech does not qualify).

Where an adjective is a link, the link is to the language or dialect of the same name. (Reference: Ethnologue, Languages of the World)

Many place-name adjectives and many demonyms refer also to various other things, sometimes with and sometimes without one or more additional words. (Sometimes, the use of one or more additional words is optional.) Notable examples are cheeses, cat breeds, dog breeds, and horse breeds. (See List of words derived from toponyms.)

== Africa ==
Name	Adjective	Demonym
Afar	Afar	Afars
Amhara	Amhara	Amharas
Cabinda	Cabindan	Cabindans
Caprivi Strip	Caprivian	Caprivians
Casamance	Casamancais	Casamancais
Cyrenaica	Cyrene	Cyrenes
Darfur	Darfur	Darfuris
Fezzan	Fezzan	Fezzanis
Kasaï	Kasaian	Kasaians
Katanga	Katangese	Katangese
Kivu	Kivutian	Kivutians
Macaronesia	Macaronesian	Macaronesians
Maghreb	Maghrebi	Maghrebis
Mediterranean	Mediterranean	
Nile River	Nilotic	
Nubia	Nubian	Nubians
Oromia	Oromo, Oromian	Oromos, Oromians
Puntland	Puntland	Puntlanders
Rif	Riffian	Riffians
Rodrigues	Rodriguan	Rodriguans
Sahara	Saharan	Sahrawi
Sahel	Sahelian	Sahelians
Senegambia	Senegambian	Senegambians
Socotra	Socotran	Soqotri, Socotrans
Tigray	Tigrayan	Tigrayans
Tripolitania	Tripolitanian	Tripolitanians
Zambezi River	Zambezian	Zambezians
Zanzibar	Zanzibari	Zanzibaris

== Americas ==
Name	Adjective	Demonym
Acadia	Acadian	Acadians
Acadiana, Cajun Country	Acadian	(Cajuns)
Aleutian Islands	Aleut, Aleutian	Aleuts, Aleutians
Amazon river and Amazon region	Amazonian	
Andes	Andean	
Antilles	Antillean	Antilleans
Appalachia	Appalachian	
Caribbean	Caribbean	
Cascadia	Cascadian	Cascadians
Ceara	Cearense	Cearenses
Chiloé Archipelago	Chilotan	Chilotes
Florida Keys		Chonchs
Galápagos Islands	Galapagueño	Galapagueños
Guiana	Guianan	Guianans
Long Island	Long Island	Long Islanders
Maritimes	Maritime	Maritimers
Minas Gerais	Mineiro	Mineiros
New England	New England	New Englanders
Northern Mexico	Norteño	Norteños
Nunatsiavut	Nunatsiavut	Nunatsiavummiut (Nunatsiavummiuk sing.)
Nunavik	Nunavik	Nunavimmiut (Nunavimmiuq sing.)
Patagonia	Patagonian	Patagonians
Paraná (state)	Paranaense	Paranaenses
Rio de Janeiro (state)	Fluminense	Fluminenses
Rio Grande do Sul	Sul-rio-grandense, Gaúcho	Gaúchos
St. Lawrence River	Laurentian	
Santa Catarina	Catarinense, Barriga-verde	Catarinenses, Barrigas-verdes
São Paulo (state)	Paulista	Paulistas
South (U.S.)	Southern	Southerners
Tierra del Fuego	Fuegian	Fuegians
Upper Peninsula of Michigan		Yoopers
West Indies	West Indian	West Indians

== Asia ==
Name	Adjective	Demonym
Bali	Balinese	Balinese
Balochistan, Baluchistan		Balochi/s, Baluchi/s
Bangsamoro		Moro
Bengal	Bengali	Bengalis
Bicol	Bicol, Bicolano	Bicolanos
Bihar	Bihari	Biharis
Borneo	Bornean	Borneans
Caucasus, Caucasia	Caucasian, Caucasic	Caucasians
Central Asia	Central Asian	Central Asians
Flores	Floresian	
Gujarat	Gujarati	Gujaratis
Himalayas	Himalayan	
Hokkaidō		Dosanko (道産子)
Indochina	Indochinese	Indochinese
Java, Pasundan	Javanese, Sundanese	Javanese, Sundanese
Kashmir	Kashmiran	Kashmiris, Kashmirite
Korea	Korean	Koreans
Kumaon	Kumaoni	Kumaiye, Kumaonis
Luzon	Luzones	Luzones
Melanesia	Melanesian	Melanesians
Moluccas	Moluccan	Moluccans
Mindanao	Mindanaoan	Mindanaoans
Negros		Negrenses, Negrosanons
Okinawa, Ryukyu Islands	Okinawan, Ryukyuan	Okinawans, Ryukyuans
Punjab	Punjabi	Punjabis
Siberia	Siberian	Siberians
Indian subcontinent	Subcontinental	Desis
Sulawesi	Sulawesian	Sulawesians
Sumatra	Sumatran	Sumatrans
Sylhet	Sylheti	Sylhetis
Tibet	Tibetan	Tibetans
Urals	Uralic	
Visayas	Visayan	Visayans

== West Asia ==
Name	Adjective	Demonym
Arabia	Arab, Arabian	Arabs, Arabians
Galilee	Galilean	Galileans
Hadhramaut	Hadhrami	Hadharem (Hadhrami sing.)
Judea, Judaea	Judean, Judaean	Judeans, Judaeans
Kurdistan	Kurdish	Kurds
Levant	Levantine	Levantines
Samaria	Samaritan	Samaritans
Anatolia	Anatolian	Anatolians

== Oceania ==
Name	Adjective	Demonym
Antipodes^{a}	Antipodean	Antipodeans
Banaba	Banaban	Banabans
Bougainville	Bougainvillean	Bougainvilleans
Chuuk	Chuukese	Chuukese
Easter Island	Easter Island	Easter Islanders, Rapa Nui
Kosrae	Kosraean	Kosraeans
Lau Islands	Lauan	Lauans
Melanesia	Melanesian	Melanesians
Micronesia	Micronesian	Micronesians
New Guinea	New Guinean	New Guineans
Pohnpei	Pohnpeian	Pohnpeians
Polynesia	Polynesian	Polynesians
Rarotonga	Rarotongan	Rarotongans
Rotuma	Rotuman	Rotumans
Tahiti	Tahitian	Tahitians
Torres Strait Islands	Torres Strait Island	Torres Strait Islanders
Yap	Yapese	Yapese
^{a} Usually refers to Australia and New Zealand.

== Europe ==
Name	Adjective	Demonym
Alps	Alpine	
Alsace	Alsatian	Alsatians
Andalusia	Andalusian	Andalusians
Apennines	Apennine	
Apulia	Apulian	Apulians
Aragon	Aragonese	Aragonese
Asturias	Asturian	Asturians
Balkans	Balkan	
Baltic region	Baltic	Balts
Bavaria	Bavarian	Bavarians
Basque Country	Basque	Basques
Bessarabia	Bessarabian	Bessarabians
Black Sea region, Chornomoriia	Black Sea, Chornomorian	Black Sea Cossacks
Bohemia	Bohemian	Bohemians
Boyko region, Boikivshchyna	Boyko	Boykos
Bukovina	Bukovinian	Bukovinians
Brittany	Breton	Bretons
Burgundy	Burgundian	Burgundians
Calabria	Calabrian	Calabrians
Campania	Campanian	Campanians
Cantabria	Cantabrian	Cantabrians
Carinthia	Carinthian	Carinthians
Carpathians	Carpathian	
Castile	Castilian	Castilians
Catalonia	Catalan	Catalans
Caucasus, Caucasia	Caucasian, Caucasic	Caucasians
Ciscarpathia	Ciscarpathian	
Cornwall	Cornish	Cornish
Corsica	Corsican	Corsicans
Courland	Curonian	Curonians
Crete	Cretan	Cretans
Crimea	Crimean	Crimeans
Cumberland, Cumbria	Cumbrian	Cumbrians
Dalmatia	Dalmatian	Dalmatians
Danube River	Danubian	
Dnieper Ukraine	Dniprian	Dniprians
Dobruja	Dobrujan	Dobrujans
Durham	Dunelmian	Dunelmians, Durhamites
Eastphalia	Eastphalian	Eastphalians
Extremadura	Extremaduran	Extremadurans
Fife	Fife	Fifers
Flanders	Flemish	Flemings
Franconia	Franconian	Franconians
Friesland, Frisian Islands	Friesian, Frisian	Friesians, Frisians
Friuli	Friulian	Friulians
Gagauzia	Gagauz, Gagauzian	Gagauz, Gagauzians
Galicia (Central Europe)	Galician	Galicians
Galloway	Gallovidian	Gallovidians
Gascony	Gascon	Gascons
Gotland	Gotland	Gotlanders
Gozo	Gozitan	Gozitans
Harrow	Harrovian	Harrovians
Hebrides	Hebridean	Hebrideans
Heligoland	Heligolandic	Heligolanders
Hesse	Hessian	Hessians
Holstein	Holsteinian	Holsteiners
Hutsul region, Hutsulshchyna	Hutsul	Hutsuls
Iberian Peninsula	Iberian	Iberians
Ingria	Ingrian	Ingrians
Istria	Istrian	Istrians
Jutland	Jutland	Jutlanders
Karelia	Karelian	Karelians
Kashubia	Kashubian	Kashubians
Kosovo	Kosovar, Kosovan	Kosovars, Kosovans
Kuban	Kuban	Kubanians, Kuban Cossacks
Left-bank Ukraine, "Little Russia" (historical), Hetmanshchyna, Hetmania	Ukrainian, "Little Russian" (historical)	Hetmanians, hetmantsi, "Little Russians" (historical), Ukrainians
Lemko region, Lemkivshchyna	Lemkian, Lemk	Lemkos, Lemkians, Lemks
Lancashire	Lancastrian	Lancastrians
Lapland, Sápmi	Laplandic, Sámi	Laplanders, Sámi
León	Leonese	Leoneses
Liguria	Ligurian	Ligurians
Lombardy	Lombard, Lombardic	Lombards
Lorraine	Lorrainian	Lorrainians
Lusatia	Lusatian	Lusatians
Mallorca, Majorca	Mallorcan, Majorcan	Mallorcans, Majorcans
Mediterranean	Mediterranean	
Menorca	Menorcan	Menorcans
Moravia	Moravian	Moravians
Murcia	Murcian	Murcians
Navarre	Navarrese	Navarrese
Normandy	Norman	Normans
Northumberland	Northumbrian	Northumbrians
Occitania	Occitan	Occitans
Orkney	Orcadian	Orcadians
Palatinate	Palatine	Palatines
Peloponnese	Peloponnesian	Peloponnesians
Pennines	Pennine	
Picardy	Picard	Picards
Piedmont	Piedmontese	Piedmontese
Po River	Padane	
Podolia, Podillia	Podolian, Podillian	Podolians, Podillians
Pokuttya	Pokuttyan	
Polesia, Polissia	Polesian, Polissian	Poleshuks, Poleshchuks
Pomerania	Pomeranian	Pomeranians
Provence	Provençal	
Pyrenees	Pyrenean	
Rhineland	Rhenish	Rhinelanders
Right-bank Ukraine, Trans-Dnieper Ukraine	Trans-Dnieper, Trans-Dniprian	
Rus' (Ruthenia)	Rus', Ruthenian, Ruthene, Rus'ian, Russian (historical)	Rus', rusichi, Ruthenians, Ruthenes, East Slavs, Ukrainians, Belarusians, Russians (historical)
Ruthenia (Carpathian Ruthenia)	Ruthenian, Ruthene	Ruthenians, Ruthenes, Rusyns, Rusnaks
Samogitia	Samogitian	Samogitians
Sardinia	Sardinian	Sardinians
Savoy	Savoyard	Savoyards
Saxony	Saxon	Saxons
Scandinavia	Scandinavian	Scandinavians
Scania	Scanian	Scanians
Shetland	Shetland	Shetlanders
Sicily	Sicilian	Sicilians
Silesia	Silesian	Silesians
Slavonia	Slavonian	Slavonians
Sloboda Ukraine, Slobozhanshchyna	Sloboda Ukrainian, Slobozhanian	Sloboda Cossacks, Sloboda Ukrainians, Slobozhanians
Styria	Styrian	Styrians
Subcarpathia (also Transcarpathia)	Subcarpathian	
Thrace	Thracian	Thracians
Thuringia	Thuringian	Thuringians
Transcarpathia (also Subcarpathia)	Transcarpathia	
Transylvania	Transylvanian	Transylvanians
Tuscany	Tuscan	Tuscans
Tyrol	Tyrolean, Tyrolese	Tyroleans, Tyrolese
Umbria	Umbrian	Umbrians
Urals	Uralic	
Valencia	Valencian	Valencians
Veneto	Venetian	Venetians
Volhynia	Volhynian	Volhynians
Wallachia	Wallachian	Wallachians
Wallonia	Walloon	Walloons
Westmorland	Westmerian	Westmerians
Westphalia	Westphalian	Westphalians
Yorkshire	Yorkshire	Yorkshiremen, Yorkshirewomen
Zaporizhzhia, Zaporozhian Ukraine	Zaporozhian	Zaporozhians
Zeeland	Zeeland	Zeelanders

== See also ==
- Demonym
  - List of adjectival and demonymic forms of place names
    - List of adjectivals and demonyms for astronomical bodies
    - List of adjectivals and demonyms for continental regions
      - List of adjectivals and demonyms for subcontinental regions
    - List of adjectival and demonymic forms for countries and nations
      - List of adjectivals and demonyms for Australia
      - List of adjectivals and demonyms for Canada
      - List of adjectivals and demonyms for India
      - List of adjectivals and demonyms for Malaysia
      - List of adjectivals and demonyms for Mexico
      - List of adjectivals and demonyms for New Zealand
      - List of adjectivals and demonyms for the Philippines
      - List of adjectivals and demonyms for the United States
    - List of adjectivals and demonyms for cities
    - List of adjectivals and demonyms for former regions
      - List of adjectivals and demonyms for Greco-Roman antiquity
    - List of adjectivals and demonyms for fictional regions
