= List of adjectivals and demonyms for former regions =

The following is a list of adjectival forms of former regions in English and their demonymic equivalents, which denote the people or the inhabitants of these former regions.

Note: Demonyms are given in plural forms. Singular forms simply remove the final 's' or, in the case of -ese endings, are the same as the plural forms. The ending -men has feminine equivalent -women (e.g. an Irishman and a Scotswoman). The French terminations -ois / ais serve as both the singular and plural masculine; adding 'e' (-oise / aise) makes them singular feminine; 'es' (-oises / aises) makes them plural feminine. The Spanish termination "-o" usually denotes the masculine and is normally changed to feminine by dropping the "-o" and adding "-a". The plural forms are usually "-os" and "-as" respectively.

Adjectives ending -ish can be used as collective demonyms (e.g. the English, the Cornish). So can those ending in -ch / -tch (e.g. the French, the Dutch) provided they are pronounced with a 'ch' sound (e.g. the adjective Czech does not qualify).

Where an adjective is a link, the link is to the language or dialect of the same name. (Reference: Ethnologue, Languages of the World)

Many place-name adjectives and many demonyms refer also to various other things, sometimes with and sometimes without one or more additional words. (Sometimes, the use of one or more additional words is optional.) Notable examples are cheeses, cat breeds, dog breeds, and horse breeds. (See List of words derived from toponyms.)

Where an adjective is a link, the link is to the language or dialect of the same name. (Reference: Ethnologue, Languages of the World)

Name	Adjective	Demonym	
Name	Adjective		colloquial
Abyssinia	Abyssinian	Abyssinians	
Acadia	Acadian	Acadians	
Akkadia	Akkadian	Akkadians	
Aksum, Axum	Aksumite, Axumite	Aksumites, Axumites	
Al-Andalus	Andalusi	Andalusis	
Annam	Annamese, Annamite	Annamese, Annamites	
Apacheria	Apache	Apache, Apaches	
Aridoamerica	Aridoamerican	Aridoamericans	
Artsakh	Artsakhi	Artsakhis	
Assyria	Assyrian	Assyrians	
Austria-Hungary	Austro-Hungarian	Austro-Hungarians, Austrians, Hungarians	
Azawad	Azawadi	Azawadis	
Aztec Empire	Aztec	Aztecs	
Babylonia	Babylonian	Babylonians	
Basutoland	Basuto	Basuto (singular Mosuto)	
Bechuanaland	Bechuana	Bechuanas	
Bessarabia	Bessarabian	Bessarabians	
Biafra	Biafran	Biafrans	
Bophuthatswana	Bophuthatswanan	Bophuthatswanans	
Burma	Burmese	Burmese^{a}	
Byelorussia	Byelorussian	Byelorussians	
Byzantium	Byzantine	Byzantines	
Canaan	Canaanite	Canaanites	
Carthage	Carthaginian	Carthaginians	
Ceylon	Ceylonese	Ceylonese	
Champa	Cham	Chams	
Chola Empire	Chola	Cholas	
Circassia	Circassian	Circassians	
Ciskei	Ciskeian	Ciskeians	
Cisplatina	Ciplatine	Cisplatines	
Cochinchina	Cochinchinese	Cochinchinese	
Comancheria	Comanche	Comanche, Comanches	
Confederate States of America	Confederate, CSA	Confederates	"Rebels", "Rebs"
Couto Misto	Couto Mixtan	Couto Mixtans	
Czechoslovakia	Czechoslovak, Czech^{b} (Czechoslovakian is incorrect, though frequent)	Czechoslovaks, Czechs, Slovaks	
Dahomey	Dahomeyan	Dahomeyans	
Dalmatia	Dalmatian	Dalmatians	
Eastern Nigeria	Easterner	Easterners	
Elam	Elamite, Elamitic, Elamitish	Elamites	
Ellice Islands	Ellicean	Elliceans	
Etruria	Etrurian, Etruscan	Etruscans	
Formosa	Formosan	Formosans	
Francia	Frankish	Franks	
Gilbert Islands	Gilbertese	Gilbertese	
Gran Colombia	Gran Colombian, Colombian	Gran Colombians, Colombians	
Hittite Empire	Hittite	Hittites	
Hunnic Empire	Hunnic, Hunnish	Huns	
Ichkeria	Ichkerian, Chechen	Ichkerians, Chechens	
Inca Empire	Inca, Incan	Incas	
Kamerun	Kamerunian	Kamerunians	
Kampuchea	Kampuchean	Kampucheans	
Katanga	Katangese	Katangese	
Kievan Rus'	Rus'	Rus'	
Kongo	Kongolese	Kongolese	
Kush	Kushite	Kushites	
Lapland	Laplandic	Lapps^{c}	
Lebowa	Lebowan	Lebowans	
Livonia	Livonian	Livonians, Livs	
Manchuria	Manchurian	Manchurians	
Malaya	Malay, Malayan	Malays, Malayans	
Memelland	Memelandish	Memellanders	
Mesoamerica	Mesoamerican	Mesoamericans	
Moldavia	Moldavian	Moldavians	
Mosquitia	Mosquitian	Mosquitians	
Muscovy, Moscovia	Muscovite, Moscovian	Muscovites	
Neutral Moresnet	Moresnetic	Moresnetters	
New Granada	New Granadan	New Granadans	
New Hebrides	New Hebridean	New Hebrideans	
Nyasaland	Nyasa	Nyasa, Nyasas	
Oasisamerica	Oasisamerican	Oasisamericans	
Ottoman Empire	Ottoman	Ottomans	
Panama Canal Zone	Canal Zone	Zonians	
Papal States	Papal	Papalini	
Parthia	Parthian	Parthians	
Peru-Bolivia	Peru-Bolivian	Peru-Bolivians, Peruvians, Bolivians	
Phoenicia	Phoenician	Phoenicians	
Pictland	Pictish	Picts	
Pomerania	Pomeranian	Pomeranians	
Prussia	Prussian	Prussians	
Purépecha Empire	Purépecha	Purépechas	
Rhodesia	Rhodesian	Rhodesians	
Rumelia	Rumelian	Rumelians	
Ruthenia	Ruthenian, Ruthene	Ruthenians, Ruthenes, East Slavs	
Rome	Roman	Romans	
Ryukyu	Ryukyuan	Ryukyuans	
Saint-Domingue	Dominiguan, Saint-Dominguan	Dominiguans, Saint-Dominguans	
Sandwich Islands	Sandwich Island	Sandwich Islanders	
Severia	Severian	Severians	
Siam	Siamese	Siamese	
Sonargaon	Sonargaiya	Sonargaiyas	
Sudetenland	Sudeten	Sudetenlanders	
Sumer	Sumerian	Sumerians	
South West Africa	South West African	South West Africans	
Soviet Union	Soviet, Russian^{d}	Soviets, Russians^{d}	
Swabia	Swabian	Swabians	
Swaziland	Swazi, Swati	Swazis	
Tanganyika	Tanganyikan	Tanganyikans	
Tartary, Tartaria	Tartar, Tartarian	Tatars, Tartars	
Taurida, Tavria	Tauridian		
Tonkin	Tonkinese	Tonkinese	
Transkei	Transkeian	Transkeians	
Transvaal	Transvaaler	Transvaalers	
Transylvania	Transylvanian	Transylvanians	
Trucial States	Trucial	Trucials	
Two Sicilies	Duosicilian	Regnicoli	
Ubangi-Shari	Ubangi-Sharian	Ubangi-Sharians	
United Arab Republic	United Arab, Egyptian^{e}, Syrian^{f}	United Arabs, Egyptians^{e}, Syrians^{f}	
Upper Volta	Upper Voltan	Upper Voltans	
Van Diemen's Land	Van Diemonian	Vandemonian	
Venda	Vendan	Venda, Vendas	
Vinland	Vinlandic	Vinlanders	
Wallachia	Wallachian	Wallachians	
Yugoslavia	Yugoslav	Yugoslavs, Yugoslavians; less commonly Jugoslavs, Jugoslavians	"Yugos" (Derogatory, Cold War Vintage)
Zaire	Zairean	Zaireans	
Zululand	Zulu	Zulu, Zulus	
^{a} Burma is also known as Myanmar.^{b} "Czech" is technically incorrect here, as it is also used to distinguish Czech people from Slovaks or other ethnic groups.^{c} "Lapp" is regarded as offensive by the Sámi people, who prefer to be called Sámi and their homeland as Sápmi as opposed to Lapland.^{d} "Russian" is technically incorrect here, as the Russian SFSR was one of several Soviet Republics.^{e} "Egyptian" is technically incorrect here, as the Egyptian Arab Republic was only one part of the union alongside the Syrian Arab Republic until 1961.^{f} "Syrian" is technically incorrect here, as the Syrian Arab Republic was only one part of the union alongside the Egyptian Arab Republic until 1961.

== See also ==
- Demonym
  - List of adjectival and demonymic forms of place names
    - List of adjectivals and demonyms for astronomical bodies
    - List of adjectivals and demonyms for continental regions
      - List of adjectivals and demonyms for subcontinental regions
    - List of adjectival and demonymic forms for countries and nations
      - List of adjectivals and demonyms for Australia
      - List of adjectivals and demonyms for Canada
      - List of adjectivals and demonyms for India
      - List of adjectivals and demonyms for Malaysia
      - List of adjectivals and demonyms for Mexico
      - List of adjectivals and demonyms for New Zealand
      - List of adjectivals and demonyms for the Philippines
      - List of adjectivals and demonyms for the United States
    - List of adjectivals and demonyms for cities
    - List of adjectivals and demonyms for former regions
      - List of adjectivals and demonyms for Greco-Roman antiquity
    - List of adjectivals and demonyms for fictional regions
