= List of demonyms for Philippine provinces =

This is a list of terms which are used, or have been used in the past, to designate the residents of specific provinces of the Philippines. These terms sometimes overlap with demonyms of ethnic groups in the Philippines, which are also used as identifiers in common parlance.

* denotes an endonym, i.e., a name from the area's indigenous language(s).

Province	Adjective	Demonym	
Province	Adjective		colloquial
Abra	Abrenian	Abreño/-a i-Abra	
Agusan del Norte	North Agusanian	Agusanon	
Agusan del Sur	South Agusanian	Agusanon	
Aklan	Aklan, Aklanon, Aklanese	Aklanon	Akeanon*
Albay	Albay, Albayan, Albayano	Albayano/-a	
Antique	Antiquenian, Antiqueño	Antiqueño/-a	
Apayao	Apayao, Apayaonian	i-Apayao	
Aurora	Auroran	Auroran taga-Aurora	
Basilan	Basilan, Basileño, Basilanese	Basileño/-a	
Bataan	Bataan, Bataanese, Bataeño	Bataeño/-a, taga-Bataan	
Batanes	Batanic, Ivatan, Ivatanic	Ivatan	
Batangas	Batangan, Batangueño	Batangueño/-a, taga-Batangas	Batangasin in Quezon
Benguet	Benguet, Benguetian	i-Benguet	Igorot ^{1}
Biliran	Biliran, Biliranian	Biliranon	
Bohol	Boholan, Boholano	Boholano/-a	Bol-anon*
Bukidnon	Bukidnon	Bukidnon	
Bulacan	Bulacan, Bulaqueño, Bulacanese	Bulaqueño/-a, taga-Bulacan	
Cagayan	Cagayan, Cagayano, Cagayanese	Cagayano/-a	
Camarines Norte	North Camarinean, Camarinense	Camarinense	
Camarines Sur	South Camarinean, Camarinense	Camarinense	
Camiguin	Camiguin	Camiguinon	
Capiz	Capizian, Capizeño	Capizeño/-a	Capiznon
Catanduanes	Catanduanean, Catandueño/-a	Catandunganon	
Cavite	Cavitenian, Caviteño	Caviteño/-a, Kabitenyo/-a, taga-Cavite	
Cebu	Cebu, Cebuan, Cebuano	Cebuano/-a	Sugbuanon*
Cotabato	Cotabato, Cotabatan, Cotabateño	Cotabateño/-a	
Davao de Oro	Golden Davao, Davaoeño, Orocanon, Oroqueño	Davaoeño/-a	
Davao del Norte	North Davao, Davaoeño	Davaoeño/-a	
Davao del Sur	South Davao, Davaoeño	Davaoeño/-a	
Davao Occidental	Western Davao, Davaoeño	Davaoeño/-a	
Davao Oriental	Eastern Davao, Davaoeño	Davaoeño/-a	
Dinagat Islands	Dinagat, Dinagatan	Dinagatnon	
Eastern Samar	Eastern Samarian, Samareño	Eastern Samareño/-a	Samarnon, Estehanon
Guimaras	Guimarasian	Guimarasnon	
Ifugao	Ifugao	Ifugao	Igorot
Ilocos Norte	North Ilocos, Ilocano	Ilocano/-a	
Ilocos Sur	South Ilocos, Ilocano	Ilocano/-a	
Iloilo	Iloilo, Iloiloan, Ilonggo	Ilonggo/-a	
Isabela	Isabelan	Isabeleño/-a	
Kalinga	Kalingan	Kalinga	
La Union	La Unionian, La Ueño	La Ueño/-a	
Laguna	Lagunian, Laguneño, Lagunense	Laguneño/-a, Lagunense, taga-Laguna	Lagunahin* in Southeastern part of Laguna
Lanao del Norte	North Lanao	Lanaonon	
Lanao del Sur	South Lanao, Maranao	Maranao	
Leyte	Leytenian	Leyteño/-a	
Maguindanao del Norte	North Maguindanaoan	Maguindanao	
Maguindanao del Sur	South Maguindanaoan	Maguindanao	
Manila	Manilan, Manileño	Manileño/-a, taga-Maynila	Maynilain in Quezon
Marinduque	Marinduquenian, Marinduqueño	Marinduqueño/-a, Marindukanon, Marinduquehin, taga-Marinduque	
Masbate	Masbatenian, Masbateño	Masbateño/-a	
Misamis Occidental	West Misamis	Occidental Misamisnon	
Misamis Oriental	East Misamis	Oriental Misamisnon	
Mountain Province	Mountaineers	i-Mountain Province	Igorot
Negros Occidental	West Negros, Negrense	Occidental Negrense	Negrosanon
Negros Oriental	East Negros, Negrense	Oriental Negrense	Negrosanon
Northern Samar	North Samarian, Samareño	Norte Samareño/-a	Nortehanon*
Nueva Ecija	Nueva Ecijan, Novo Ecijano	Novo Ecijano/-a, taga-Nueva Ecija	
Nueva Vizcaya	Nueva Vizcayan, Novo Vizcayano	Novo Vizcayano/-a	
Occidental Mindoro	West Mindorenian, Mindoreño	Occidental Mindoreño/-a, taga-Occidental Mindoro	
Oriental Mindoro	East Mindorenian, Mindoreño	Oriental Mindoreño/-a, taga-Oriental Mindoro	
Palawan	Palawan, Palaweño	Palaweño/-a	
Pampanga	Pampangan, Pampangueño	Pampangueño/-a	Kapampangan*
Pangasinan	Pangasinan,	Pangasinense	Pangalatok ^{2}
Quezon	Quezonian, Quezonin	Quezonian, Quezonin, taga-Quezon, Tayabasin,^{3} Tayabeño/-a,^{3} Tayabense ^{3}	
Quirino	Quirinian	Quirinian	
Rizal	Rizalian, Rizaleño	Rizaleño/-a, taga-Rizal	
Romblon	Romblonian	Romblomanon	
Samar	West Samarian, Samareño	Samareño/-a	Samarnon, Westehanon
Sarangani	Sarangan	Sarangan	
Siquijor	Siquijorian	Siquijornon, Siquijodnon	
Sorsogon	Sorsogonian, Sorsogueño	Sorsogueño/-a	Sorsoganon
South Cotabato	South Cotabatan, South Cotabateño	South Cotabateño/-a	
Southern Leyte	Southern Leytenian	Southern Leyteño/-a	
Sultan Kudarat	Sultan Kudaratenian, Sultan Kudarateño	Sultan Kudarateño/-a	
Sulu	Sulu, Suluan, Suluano	Suluano/-a	
Surigao del Norte	North Surigaoan	Surigaonon	
Surigao del Sur	South Surigaoan	Surigaonon	
Tarlac	Tarlaquenian, Tarlaqueño	Tarlaqueño/-a, Tarlakin, taga-Tarlac	
Tawi-Tawi	Tawi-Tawian	Tawi-Tawian	
Zambales	Zambalean, Zambaleño	Zambaleño/-a	Sambal
Zamboanga del Norte	North Zamboangan, Zamboangueño	Norte Zamboangueño/-a	
Zamboanga del Sur	South Zamboangan, Zamboangueño	Zamboangueño/-a	Chavacano*
Zamboanga Sibugay	Sibugay	Sibugaynon, Zamboangueño/-a	
1. Sometimes discriminatory or derogatory.; 2. Considered derogatory.; 3. From the province's former name, Tayabas.

== See also ==
- Demonym
  - List of adjectival and demonymic forms of place names
    - List of adjectivals and demonyms for astronomical bodies
    - List of adjectivals and demonyms for continental regions
      - List of adjectivals and demonyms for subcontinental regions
    - List of adjectival and demonymic forms for countries and nations
      - List of adjectivals and demonyms for Australia
      - List of adjectivals and demonyms for Canada
      - List of adjectivals and demonyms for India
      - List of adjectivals and demonyms for Malaysia
      - List of adjectivals and demonyms for Mexico
      - List of adjectivals and demonyms for New Zealand
      - List of adjectivals and demonyms for the Philippines
      - List of adjectivals and demonyms for the United States
    - List of adjectivals and demonyms for cities
    - List of adjectivals and demonyms for former regions
      - List of adjectivals and demonyms for Greco-Roman antiquity
    - List of adjectivals and demonyms for fictional regions
