= List of adjectivals and demonyms for cities =

The following is a list of adjectival forms of cities in English and their demonymic equivalents, which denote the people or the inhabitants of these cities.

Demonyms ending in -ese are the same in the singular and plural forms.

The ending -man has feminine equivalent -woman (e.g. an Irishman and a Scotswoman). The French terminations -ois / ais serve as both the singular and plural masculine; adding 'e' (-oise / aise) makes them singular feminine; 'es' (-oises / aises) makes them plural feminine. The Spanish termination "-o" usually denotes the masculine and is normally changed to feminine by dropping the "-o" and adding "-a". The plural forms are usually "-os" and "-as", respectively.

Adjectives ending -ish can be used as collective demonyms (e.g. the English, the Cornish). So can those ending in -ch / -tch (e.g. the French, the Dutch) provided they are pronounced with a 'ch' /tʃ/ sound (e.g. the adjective Czech does not qualify as its -ch is pronounced /k/).

Where an adjective is a link, the link is to the language or dialect of the same name.

Many place-name adjectives and many demonyms also refer to various other things, sometimes with and sometimes without one or more additional words. Additionally, sometimes the use of one or more additional words is optional. Notable examples are cheeses, cat breeds, dog breeds, and horse breeds.

Note: many of these adjectivals and demonyms are not used in English as frequently as their counterparts in other languages. A common practice is to use a city's name as if it were an adjective, as in "Vienna Philharmonic Orchestra", "Melbourne suburbs", etc.

== Table ==
City	Adjective	Demonym
Aachen	Aachener	Aachener
Aalborg	Aalborgenser	Aalborgenser
Aarhus	Aarhusian	Aarhusian
Aberdeen	Aberdonian	Aberdonian
Abidjan	Abidjanais	Abidjanais
Abu Dhabi	Abu Dhabian, Dhabyani	Abu Dhabian, Dhabyani
Accra	Accran	Accran
Adana	Adanite	Adanite
Addis Ababa	Addis Ababan, Addis Ababian	Addis Ababan, Addis Ababian
Adelaide	Adelaidean	Adelaidean
Aden	Adeni	Adeni
Agde	Agathois	Agathois
Aguascalientes	Hidrocálido	Hidrocálido
Ahmedabad	Amdavadi	Amdavadi
Ahvaz	Ahvazi	Ahvazi
Aix-en-Provence	Aixois	Aixois
Ajaccio	Ajaccien, Aiaccini, Ajaccini, Aghjaccini	Ajaccien, Aiaccini, Ajaccini, Aghjaccini
Ajman	Ajmanese	Ajmanese
Albany	Albanian	Albanian
Albuquerque	Albuquerquean	Albuquerquean, Burqueño
Aleppo	Aleppine	Aleppine
Alexandria	Alexandrian	Alexandrine
Algiers	Algérois	Algérois
Almaty	Almatian	Almatian
Almería	Almerian, Almeriense, Urcitano	Almerian, Almeriense, Urcitano
Alofi	Alofian	Alofian
Alpine	Alpinian	Alpinian
Amalfi	Amalfitan	Amalfitan
Amarillo	Amarilloan	Amarilloan
Amman	Ammani	Ammani
Ammon	Ammonite	Ammonite
Amparo	Amparense	Amparense
Amsterdam	Amsterdammer	Amsterdammer
Anaheim	Anaheimian, Anaheimer	Anaheimian, Anaheimer
Anchorage	Anchorageite	Anchorageite
Andong	Andong, Andongite	Andongite
Andorra la Vella	Andorran	Andorran
Ankara	Ankarite	Ankarite
Angeles	Angelino	Angelino
Angers	Anjou	Angevin
Annapolis	Annapolitan	Annapolitan
Antakya	Antakyan, Antiochian	Antakyan, Antiochian
Antalya	Antalyan	Antalyan
Antananarivo	Antananarivan	Antananarivan
Antiguo Cuscatlán	Cuscatleco	Cuscatleco
Antipolo	Antipoleño	Antipoleño
Antwerp	Antwerpian	Antwerpian, Antwerpenaar
Aosta	Aostan, Aostain	Aostan, Aostain
Apia	Apian	Apian
Aqaba	Aqabawi	Aqabawi
Arequipa	Arequipeño (m), Arequipeña (f)	Arequipeño (m), Arequipeña (f)
Arezzo	Arretine	Arretine
Arlington	Arlingtonian	Arlingtonian
Armagh	Armachian	Armachian
Armidale	Armidilian	Armidilian
Ashdod	Ashdodi	Ashdodi
Asheville	Ashevillain	Ashevillain
Ashgabat	Ashgabati, Ashgabatian	Ashgabati, Ashgabatian
Ashkelon	Ashkelonian	Ashkelonian
Asmara	Asmaran	Asmaran
Astana	Astanan	Astanan
Astrakhan	Astrakhanian	Astrakhanian
Asunción	Asunceno	Asunceno
Athens	Athenian, Attic (Note: "Attic" is usually used only in reference to Ancient Athens)	Athenian
Atlanta	Atlantan	Atlantan
Auckland	Aucklander	Aucklander, Jafa
Augsburg	Augsburger	Augsburger
Augusta, Georgia	Augustan	Augustan
Augusta, Maine	Augustan	Augustan
Austin	Austonian, Austinite	Austonian, Austinite
Avarua	Avaruan	Avaruan
Aydın	Aydinian	Aydinian
Bacolod	Bacolodnon	Bacolodnon
Baghdad	Baghdadi, Bagdadi, Baghdadian, Bagdadian	Baghdadi, Bagdadi, Baghdadian, Bagdadian
Bakersfield	Bakersfieldian, Bakersfielder	Bakersfieldian, Bakersfielder
Baku	Bakuvian	Bakuvian
Balıkesir	Balikesirian	Balikesirian
Baltimore	Baltimorean, Baltimorese	Baltimorean, Baltimorese
Bamako	Bamakoan	Bamakoan
Banda Aceh	Banda Acehnese	Banda Acehnese
Bandung	Bandungite	Bandungite
Bangalore	Bangalorean	Bangalorean
Bangkok	Bangkokian	Bangkokian
Banjul	Banjulian	Banjulian
Barcelona	Barcelonian	Barcelonian
Barisal	Barisali	Barisali, Borishali, Barisailla, Borishailla
Barranquilla	Barranquillero (m), Barranquillera (f)	Barranquillero (m), Barranquillera (f)
Basel	Basler	Basler, Bebbi
Bath	Bathonian	Bathonian
Baton Rouge	Baton Rougean	Baton Rougean
Bedford	Bedfordian (not Bedfordite)	Bedfordian
Beersheba	Beersheban	Beersheban
Beijing	Beijingese	Beijinger
Beirut	Beiruti	Beiruti
Belém	Belenense	Belenense
Belfast	Belfast, Belfastian	Belfastie, Belfaster, Belfastian, Belfastite
Belford Roxo	Belforroxense	Belforroxense
Belgrade	Belgradian	Belgradian, Belgrader
Belgorod	Belgorodian	Belgorodian
Belize City	Belizean	Belizean
Bellinzona	Bellinzonese	Bellinzonese
Belmopan	Belmopanese	Belmopanese
Belo Horizonte	Belo-Horizontino	Belo-Horizontino
Benevento	Beneventan	Beneventan
Bengeo	Bengean	Bengean
Benghazi	Benghazian	Benghazian
Bergamo	Bergamasque	Bergamasque
Bergen	Bergenese	Bergener
Berkeley	Berkeleyan, Berkeleyite	Berkeleyan, Berkeleyite
Berlin	Berliner, Berlinese	Berliner
Bern	Bernese	Bernese
Bethesda	Bethesdan	Bethesdan
Bethlehem	Bethlehemi, Bethlehemite	Bethlehemi, Bethehemite
Bethlehem, Pennsylvania	Bethlehemian	Bethlehemian
Béziers	Bitterois	Bitterois
Bhopal	Bhopali	Bhopali
Bilbao	Bilbaoan	Bilbaoan
Birmingham	Brummie	Brummie
Birmingham, Alabama	Birminghamian	Birminghamian, Birminghamster, Ham'r
Birobidzhan	Birobidzhanian	Birobidzhaner
Bishkek	Bishkekian	Bishkekian, Bishkeker
Bismarck	Bismarkian	Bismarkian
Bissau	Bissauan	Bissauan
Blackburn	Blackburnian	Blackburnian
Blois	Bloisian, Blésois (m), Blésoise (f)	Bloisian, Blesois (m), Blésoise (f)
Bnei Brak	Bnei Brakian	Bnei Brakian
Bodrum	Bodrumian	Bodrumite
Boise	Boisean	Boisean
Bologna	Bolognese	Bolognese
Bolzano	Bolzanini, Bozner, Bozener, Bulsanins	Bolzanini, Bozner, Bozener, Bulsanins
Bogotá	Bogotano (m), Bogotana (f)	Bogotano (m), Bogotana (f), Rolo (m), Rola (f)
Bogor	Bogorian	Bogorian
Bolgatanga	Guruŋa	Guruŋa
Bolton	Boltonian	Boltonian
Bordeaux	Bordelais	Bordelais
Bossangoa	Bossangoan	Bossangoan
Boston	Bostonian	Bostonian, Bostonite, Bostoner, Hubbite
Bradford	Bradfordian	Bradfordian
Brasília	Brasiliense	Brasiliense
Bratislava	Bratislavan	Bratislavan
Brazzaville	Brazzavillian, Brazzavillean	Brazzavillian, Brazzavillean
Bremen	Bremer	Bremer
Brescia	Brescian	Brescian
Brighton	Brightonian	Brightonian
Brisbane	Brisbanian	Brisbanite, Brisbanian, Brisvegan (slang), Briswegian (slang)
Bristol	Bristolian	Bristolian
Brooklyn	Brooklynite	Brooklynite
Brussels	Brusselian	Brusselian, Brusseler
Bucaramanga	Bumangués (m), Bumanguésa (f), Santandereano (m), Santandereana (f)	Bumangués (m), Bumanguésa (f), Santandereano (m), Santandereana (f)
Bucharest	Bucharestian	Bucharester
Budapest	Budapestian	Budapester, Budapestian
Buenos Aires	Porteño	Porteño
Buffalo	Buffalonian	Buffalonian
Burlington	Burlingtonian	Burlingtonian
Bursa	Bursanese	Bursanese
Busan	Busan, Busanian	Busanian
Cabinda	Cabindan	Cabindan
Cádiz	Gaditano	Gaditano
Calais	Calais	Calaisiens
Cagayan de Oro	Cagayanon	Cagayanon
Cagliari	Cagliaritano, Casteddaju	Cagliaritano, Casteddaju
Cairns	Cairnsite	Cairnsite
Cairo	Cairene	Cairene
Calgary	Calgarian	Calgarian
Cali	Caleño	Caleño
Camarillo	Camarillan	Camarillan
Cambridge	Cantabrigian (Note: Also used to identify graduates of the University of Cambridge.)	Cantabrigian
Cambridge, Massachusetts	Cantabrigian	Cantabrigian
Campeche	Campechano	Campechano
Campinas	Campineiro	Campineiro
Campo Grande	Campo-grandense	campo-grandense
Canberra	Canberran	Canberran
Cape Town	Capetonian	Capetonian, Kapenaar
Caracas	Caraquenian	Caraqueño (m), Caraqueña (f)
Cardiff	Cardiffian	Cardiffian
Carlisle	Carlislian	Carlislian
Carson City	Carsonite	Carsonite
Cartagena	Cartagenero (m), Cartagenera (f)	Cartagenero (m), Cartagenera (f)
Carthage	Carthaginian	Carthaginian
Carystus	Carystian	Christian
Casablanca	Casablancan	Casablancan
Casper	Casperite	Casperite
Castlecrag	Castlecragian	Cragman
Cayenne	Cayennais	Cayennais
Cebu	Cebuano	Cebuano
Ceuta	Ceutan	Ceutan
Changwon	Changwon, Changwonian	Changwonian
Charleston (South Carolina)	Charlestonian	Charlestonian
Charleston (West Virginia)	Charlestonian	Charlestonian
Charlotte	Charlottean	Charlottean
Charlottetown	Charlottetonian	Charlottetonian, Charlottetowner
Chelmsford	Chelmsfordian	Chelmsfordian
Cheltenham	Cheltonian	Cheltonian
Chengdu	Chengduese	Chengduese
Chennai	Chennaite	Chennaite
Chester	Cestrian	Cestrian
Chesterfield	Cestrefeldian	Cestrefeldian
Cheyenne	Cheyenneite	Cheyenneite
Chiasso	Chiassese	Chiassese
Chicago	Chicagoan	Chicagoan
Chichester	Cicestrian	Cicestrian
Chihuahua	Chihuahuense	Chihuahuense
Chilliwack	Chilliwackian	Chilliwackian, Chilliwacker, Chilliwhacko
Chișinău	Chișinăuieni	Chișinăuieni
Chittagong	Chittagonian	Chittagonian, Chottogrami, Chatigaiya, Sitainga, Chittagainga
Chongqing	Chongqingese	Chongqingese
Christchurch	Cantabrian	Cantabrian
Cincinnati	Cincinnatian	Cincinnatian
Cleveland	Clevelander	Clevelander
Cluj-Napoca	Clujean	Clujean
Coachella	Coachellan	Coachellan
Coimbatore	Coimbatoreian	Coimbatoreian
Colchester	Colchester	Colcestrian
Cologne	Colognian	Colognian
Columbia	Columbian	Columbian
Columbus	Columbusite	Columbusite
Comrat	Comratian	Comratian
Conakry	Conakrien	Conakrien
Copenhagen	Copenhagener	Copenhagener
Córdoba	Cordobés, Cordobense	Cordobés
Corfu	Corfiot	Corfiot
Corinth	Corinthian	Corinthian
Cork	Cork	Corkonian, Leesider
Corona	Coronan	Coronan
Corpus Christi	Corpus Christian	Corpus Christian
Coventry	Coventrian	Coventrian
Culiacán	Culichi	Culiacanense
Cusco	Cusco	Cusqueño (m), Cusqueña (f), Cuzqueño (m), Cuzqueña (f)
Curitiba	Curitibano	Curitibano
Da Lat	Dalatese	Dalatese
Daegu	Daegu, Daeguite	Daeguite
Dalaman	Dalamanian	Dalamanian
Dallas	Dallasite	Dallasite
Dakar	Dakarois	Dakarois
Damascus	Damascene	Damascene
Darwin	Darwinian (Note: Not to be confused with the movements and concepts of English naturalist Charles Darwin.)	Darwinian
Davao	Davaoeño	Davaoeño (m), Davaoeña (f)
Davenport	Davenportian	Davenportian
Delhi	Delhiite	Delhiite
Denizli	Denizlian	Denizlian
Denver	Denverite	Denverite
Derry	Derry	Derrian
Des Moines	Des Moineser, Des Moinesite	Des Moineser, Des Moinesite
Detroit	Detroiter	Detroiter
Devonport	Devonportian	Devonportian
Dhaka	Dhakai	Dhakai, Dhakaiya, Dhakaite
Dili	Dilian	Dilian
Diyarbakır	Diyarbakirian	Diyarbakirian
Dnipro	Dniprian	Dniprianyn (m), Dniprianka (f)
Donetsk	Donetskian	Donetskian
Dover	Doverite	Doverite
Dresden	Dresdener	Dresdener
Dublin	Dubliner, Dub, Jackeen	Dubliner, Dub, Jackeen
Dubai	Dubaite	Dubaite
Duluth	Duluthian	Duluthian
Dundee	Dundonian	Dundonian
Dunedin	Dunedin	Dunedinite
Durango	Duranguense, Durangoan	Duranguense, Durangoan
Durban	Durbanite	Durbanite
Durham, England	Dunelmian	Dunelmian
Durham, North Carolina	Durhamite	Durhamite
Dushanbe	Dushanbean	Dushanbean
Düsseldorf	Düsseldorfer	Düsseldorfer
East Troy	East Trojan	East Trojan
Eastvale	Eastvalean	Eastvalean
Edgewater	Edgewartian	Edgewartian
Edinburgh	Edinburgensian (Note: Rare.)	Embran, Edinburger (Note: Rare.)
Edmonton	Edmontonian	Edmontonian
Eilat	Eilatian	Eilatian
El Centro	El Centran, Centreño (m), Centreña (f)	El Centran, Centreño (m), Centreña (f)
El Paso	El Pasoan	El Pasoan
Emeryville	Emeryvillian	Emeryvillian
Épalinges	Palinsard	Palinsard
Epidaurus	Epidaurian	Epidaurian
Erbil	Erbili, Arbili	Erbili, Arbili
Erzurum	Erzurumian	Erzurumian
Eskişehir	Eskishehirian	Eskishehirian
Eugene	Eugenean, Eugenian	Eugenean, Eugenian
Everett	Everettite	Everettite
Exeter	Exonian	Exonian
Fairbanks	Fairbanksan	Fairbanksan
Famagusta	Salaminioti	Salaminioti
Fargo	Fargoan	Fargoan
Ferrara	Ferrarese	Ferrarese
Fethiye	Fethiyennese	Fethiyennese
Fez	Fessi	Fessi
Filettino	Filettinesi	Filettinesi
Finchley	Finchleian	Finchleian
Florence	Florentine	Florentine
Fontana	Fontanan	Fontanan
Fort Lauderdale	Fort Lauderdaler, Fort Lauderdalian	Fort Lauderdaler, Fort Lauderdalian
Fort Wayne	Fort Wayner	Fort Wayner
Fort Worth	Fort Worthian, Fort Worther	Fort Worthian, Fort Worther
Foz do Iguaçu	Iguaçuense	Iguaçuense
Frankfurt	Frankfurter	Frankfurter
Fredericton	Frederictonian	Frederictonian
Freetown	Freetownian	Freetownian
Fremont	Fremonter	Fremonter
Fresno	Fresnan, Fresnite	Fresnan, Fresnite
Fujairah	Fujairahnese	Fujairahnese
Fullerton	Fullertonian	Fullertonian
Funafuti	Funafutian	Funafutian
Galway	Galway	Galwegian
Gangtok	Gangtokian	Gangtokian
Garden Grove	Garden Grover	Gardern Grover
Gatineau	Gatinois	Gatinois
Gaza	Gazan	Gazan
Gaziantep	Antepian	Antepian
Gibraltar	Gibraltarian	Gibraltarian
Geelong	Geelong	Geelongite, Pivotonian
Geneva	Genevan, Genevese, Genfer	Genevan, Genevese, Genfer
Genoa	Genoese	Genoese
Geoje	Geoje	Geojeite
Germiston	Germistonian	Germistonian
Ghent	Ghentian	Ghentian
Giza	Gizan (m), Gizanne (f)	Gizan (m), Gizanne (f)
Glasgow	Glaswegian	Glaswegian, Weegie
Gloucester	Gloucestrian	Gloucestrian
Godalming	Godhelmian	Godhelmian, Godalminger
Goiânia	Goianiense	Goianiense
Gold Coast	Gold Coast	Gold Coaster
Gosford	Gosford	Gosfordian
Gothenburg	Gothenburger	Gothenburger
Granada	Granadino, Granadí, Iliberitano	Granadino, Iliberitano
Grand Junction	Grand Junctioneer	Grand Junctioneer
Grand Rapids	Grand Rapidian	Grand Rapidian
Graz	Grazer	Grazer
Grenoble	Grenoblois	Grenoblois
Grozny	Groznian	Groznian
Guadalajara	Tapatío	Tapatío
Guangzhou (Canton)	Guangzhouese, Cantonese	Guangzhouese, Cantonese
Guaraí	Guaraiense	Guaraiense
Guayaquil	Guayaquilean	Guayaquilean
Guelph	Guelphite	Guelphite
Gumi	Gumi, Gumite	Gumite
Gwangju	Gwangju, Gwangjuite	Gwangjuite
Gyeongju	Gyeongju, Gyeongjuite	Gyeongjuite
Hagåtña	Hagåtñan	Hagåtñan
The Hague	Haguer	Haguer
Haifa	Haifan	Haifan
Halifax	Haligonian	Haligonian
Hamburg	Hamburger	Hamburger
Hamilton, New Zealand	Hamiltonian	Hamiltonian
Hamilton, Ontario	Hamiltonian	Hamiltonian
Hanga Roa	Hanga Roan	Hanga Roan
Hangzhou	Hangzhounese	Hangzhounese
Hanoi	Hanoian	Hanoian
Hanover	Hanoverian	Hanoverian
Harare	Hararean	Hararean
Harbin	Harbinite	Harbinite
Hargeisa	Hargeysaawi	Hargeysaawi
Harrisburg	Harrisburger	Harrisburger
Hartford	Hartfordite, Hartforder, Hartfordian	Hartfordite, Hartforder, Hartfordian
Hartlepool	Hartlepudlian	Hartlepudlian, Monkey hanger
Hastings	Hastingite	Hastingite
Hastings	Hastinger	Hastinger
Hatay	Hatayan (see also, Antakya)	Hatayan (see also, Antakya)
Havana	Havanan; Habanero (m), Habanera (f)	Havanan; Habanero (m), Habanera (f)
Hayward	Haywardite	Haywardite
Helena	Helenan	Helenan
Helsinki	Helsinkian	Helsinkian
Heraklion	Heraklian, Heraclian	Heraklian, Heraclian
Hermosillo	Hermosillense	Hermosillense
Hiroshima	Hiroshiman	Hiroshiman
Ho Chi Minh City	Saigonese	Saigoner, Saigonese
Hobart	Hobartian	Hobartian
Hohhot	Hohhotian	Hohhotian
Holon	Holonian	Holonian
Hong Kong	Hong Kong, Hongkongish, Hongkongese	Hongkonger, Hongkongish, Honger, Hongkongese, Honkey
Honolulu	Honoluluan, Honolulan	Honoluluan, Honolulan
Houston	Houstonian	Houstonian, Houstonite
Huelva	Onubense, Huelveño	Onubense, Huelveño
Hyderabad	Hyderabadi	Hyderabadi
Iloilo	Ilonggo	Ilonggo
Incheon	Incheon, Incheoner	Incheoner
Indianapolis	Hoosier	Hoosier, Indianapolitan
Indio	Indioese	Indioese
Invercargill	Invercargill	Invercargillite, Invercargillonian
Inverness	Invernessian	Invernessian
Iowa City	Iowa Citian	Iowa Citian
Ipoh	Ipohan, Ipohian, Ipohite	Ipohan, Ipohian, Ipohite
Iqaluit	Iqalummiuq (sg), Iqalummiut (pl)	Iqalummiuq (sg), Iqalummiut (pl)
Iriga	Irigueño	Irigueño
Irkutsk	Irkutskian	Irkutskian
Islamabad	Islamabadi	Islamabadi
Istanbul	Istanbulite	Istanbulite
Itabira	Itabirano (m), Itabirana (f)	Itabirano (m), Itabirana (f)
Itapira	Itapirense	Itapirense
Ithaca, New York	Ithacan	Ithacan
İzmir	Izmirite, Izmirian	Izmirite, Izmirian
İzmit	Izmitite	Izmitite
Jacksonville	Jacksonvillian, Jaxon	Jacksonvillian, Jaxon
Jaén	Jienense, Jaenés, Aurgitano	Jienense, Aurgitano
Jakarta	Jakartan	Jakartanais, Jakartan
Jammu	Jammuwala, Jammuwale, Jammuite	Jammuwala, Jammuwale, Jammuite
Jeddah	Jeddawi	Jeddawi
Jeonju	Jeonju, Jeonjuite	Jeonjuite
Jericho	Jerichoan	Jerichoan, Jerichoite
Jerusalem	Jerusalemite, Yerushalmi	Jerusalemite, Yerushalmi
Johannesburg	Johannesburg	Johannesburger, Joburger
John o' Groats	Groater	Groater
Joplin	Joplinite	Joplinite
Joshua	Joshuan, Joshuvian	Joshuan, Joshuvian
Juba	Juban	Juban
Juiz de Fora	Juiz-forano	Juiz-forano
Juneau	Juneauite	Juneauite
Kabul	Kabuli	Kabuli
Kahramanmaraş	Marashian	Marashian
Kaliningrad	Kaliningradian	Kaliningradian
Kaluga	Kaluzhanin	Kaluzhane
Kampala	Kampalan	Kampalan
Kandy	Kandian	Kandian
Kansas City, Kansas	Kansas Citian (Note: Residents of both Kansas City, Missouri and Kansas City, Kansas are referred to as Kansas Citians.)	Kansas Citian; Kansas Cityan; Kansas City, Kansan (Note: Residents of Kansas City, Kansas are both Kansas Citians and Kansans.)
Kansas City, Missouri	Kansas Citian	Kansas Citian; Kansas Cityan; Kansas City, Missourian (Note: Residents of Kansas City, Missouri are both Kansas Citians and Missourians.)
Karachi	Karachiite	Karachiite
Karpasia	Karpasias	Karpasias
Kastoria	Kastorian	Kastorian
Kathmandu	Kathmanduese, Kathmandui	Kathmanduese, Kathmandui
Kayseri	Kayserian	Kayserian
Kazan	Kazanian	Kazanian
Kenosha	Kenoshan	Kenoshan
Key West	Key Wester	Key Wester, Conch
Kharkiv	Kharkivian	Kharkivian, Karkivite
Khartoum	Khartoumese	Khartoumese, Khartoumian
Kherson	Khersonian, Khersonite	Khersonian, Khersonite
Khulna	Khulna	Khulnaiya, Khulnaite
Kingston	Kingstonian	Kingstonian
Kingston upon Hull	Hullensian	Hullensian
Kinshasa	Kinshasan	Kinshasan
Kirkwall	Kirkwallian	Kirkwallian
Kitchener	Kitchenerite	Kitchenerite
Klerksdorp	Klerksdorpian	Klerksdorper, Klerksdorpian
Knoxville	Knoxvillian	Knoxvillian
Kocaeli	Kocalian (see also İzmit)	Kocaelian (see also İzmit)
Kolkata	Kolkatan	Kolkatan, Calcuttan
Konya	Konyanite	Konyanite
Kraków	Krakovian, Cracovian	Krakovian, Cracovian
Kralendijk	Kralendijker	Kralendijker
Kuala Lumpur	KLite, KL-ite, Kuala Lumpurian	KLite, KL-ite, Kuala Lumpurian
Kuching	Kuchingite	Kuchingite
Kursk	Kurskian	Kurskian
Kuwait City	Kuwaiti	Kuwaiti
Kyiv	Kyivan, Kievan	Kyivan, Kyyivan, Kievan, Kyivite, Kievite,
Kyoto	Kyotoite	Kyotoite
Kyzyl	Kyzyzlian	Kyzylian
La Paz	Paceño	Paceño
Lagos	Lagosian	Lagosian
Lahore	Lahori	Lahori
Lake Elsinore	Elsinorese	Elsinorese
Lancaster	Lancastrian	Lancastrian
Laredo	Laredoan, Laredense	Laredoan, Laredense
Larnaka	Larnakade	Larnakade
Las Vegas	Las Vegan	Las Vegan
Launceston	Launcestonian, Launnie, Lonnie	Launcestonian
Lausanne	Lausannois	Lausannois
Laval	Lavalois, Lavaloise	Lavalois, Lavaloise
Leeds	Leodensian	Leodensian, Loiner
Leeuwarden	Leeuwarder	Leeuwarder
Leicester	Leicestrian	Chizzit
Leipzig	Leipziger	Leipziger
Legazpi	Legazpeño	Legazpeño
León	Leonese	Leonese
Lerwick	Lerwegian	Lerwegian
Lexington	Lexingtonian	Lexingtonian
Lhasa	Lhasan	Lhasan
Libral	Liberalite	Liberarian, Libertarian, Liberalien
Ligao	Ligaoeño	Ligaoeño
Lilongwe	Lilongwean	Lilongwean
Lima	Limeño	Limeño
Limassol	Lemesouti	Lemesouti
Limerick	Limerick	Limerickman, Shannonsider
Lincoln	Lincolnite	Lincolnite
Linz	Linzer	Linzer
Lisbon	Lisboan, Lisboeta	Lisboan, Lisboeta, Lisboner, Alfacinha
Little Rock	Little Rockian	Little Rockian
Liverpool	Liverpudlian, Scouse	Liverpudlian, Scouser
Livorno	Leghornese, Livornese	Leghornese, Livornese
Ljubljana	Ljubljana	Ljubljančan (m), Ljubljančanka (f)
Locarno	Locarnese	Locarnese
London	Londoner	Londoner, Londonite
Londrina	Londrinense	Londrinense
Los Altos	Los Altan	Los Altan
Los Angeles	Angeleno, Angeleño	Angeleno, Angeleño
Louisville	Louisvillian	Louisvillian
Luanda	Luandan	Luandan
Lubbock	Lubbockite	Lubbockite
Lucca	Lucchese	Lucchesi
Lugano	Luganese	Luganese
Luhansk	Luhanskian, Luganskian	Luhanskian, Luganskian
Lusaka	Lusakan	Lusakan
Luton	Lutonian	Lutonian
Luxembourg City	Luxembourger	Luxembourger
Lviv	Lvivite, Lvivian, Leopolitan	Lvivite, Lvivian, Leopolitan, Lemberger, Ukrainian Lvivianyn (m), Lvivianka (f)
Lyon	Lyonese, Lyonnais	Lyonese, Lyonnais
Macau	Macanese	Macanese
Mackay	Mackayite	Mackayite
Madrid	Madrilenian, Madrileño	Madrilenian, Madrileño
Magadan	Magadanian	Magadanian
Makati	Makiteño	Makiteño
Makhachkala	Makhachkalan	Makhachkalan
Malabo	Malabeño (m), Malabeña (f)	Malabeño (m), Malabeña (f)
Malacca	Malaccan	Malaccan
Málaga	Malagenean, Malagueño, Malacitano	Malagenean, Malagueño, Malacitano
Malatya	Malatyan	Malatyan
Managua	Managuan	Managuan
Manaus	Manauara, Manauense	Manauara, Manauense
Manchester	Mancunian	Mancunian, Manc
Mandaluyong	Mandaleño	Mandaleño
Manila	Manileño, Manilan	Manileño, Taga-Maynila
Manisa	Manisanian	Manisanian
Mannheim	Mannheimer	Mannheimer
Mantua	Mantuan	Mantuan
Maputo	Maputan	Maputan
Marathon	Marathonian	Marathonian
Mardin	Mardinian	Mardinian
Mariehamn	Mariehamner	Mariehamner
Marikina	Marikeño	Marikeño
Mariupol	Mariupolitan	Mariupolitan
Marmaris	Marmarisian	Marmarisian
Marrakesh	Marrakshi	Marrakshi
Marseille	Marseillais	Marseillais
Marshall	Marshall, Marshallite (Note: Marshallite as an adjectival form is rare and archaic)	Marshallite
Masbate	Masbateño	Masbateño
Maseru	Maseruan	Maseruan
Maykop	Maykopian	Maykopian
Mersin	Mersinite	Mersinite
Mecca	Meccan	Meccan
Medellín	Paisa	Paisa
Medina	Medinan	Medinan
Megara	Megarian	Megarian
Melbourne	Melburnian	Melburnian
Melilla	Melillan	Melillan
Memphis	Memphian	Memphian
Mendrisio	Mendrisiense, Mendrisiotto	Mendrisiense, Mendrisiotto
Mérida	Meridiano	Meridiano
Mersin	Mersinite	Mersinite
Messina	Messinese	Messinese
Mexico	Mexicoan	Mexicoan
Mexico City	Capitalino	Capitalino, Chilango, Defeño
Miami	Miamian	Miamian
Middlesbrough	Smoggie	Smoggie
Milan, Italy	Milanese	Milanese
Milan, New York	Milanite, Milaner	Milanite, Milaner
Milwaukee	Milwaukeean	Milwaukeean
Minsk	Minskite	Minskite
Misrata	Misratan	Misratan
Minneapolis	Minneapolitan	Minneapolitan
Minot	Minotian	Minoter
Mississauga	Mississaugan	Mississaugan
Missoula	Missoulian	Missoulian
Mobile	Mobilian	Mobilian
Modena	Modenese	Modenese
Mogadishu	Mogadishan	Mogadishan
Mogi Guaçu	Guaçuano	Guaçuano
Mogi Mirim	Mogimiriano	Mogimiriano
Moline	Moliner	Moliner
Monaco	Monegasque	Monegasque, Monacoan
Monrovia	Monrovian	Monrovian
Monterrey	Regiomontano	Regiomontano
Montevideo	Montevidean	Montevidean; Montevideano (m), Montevideana (f)
Montgomery	Montgomeryan	Montgomeryan
Montpelier	Montpelierite	Montpelierite
Montreal	Montrealer	Montrealer, Montréalais
Moorpark	Moorparker	Moorparker
Moose Jaw	Moose Jaw	Moose Javians
Morphou	Morfitis	Morfitis
Moscow, Idaho	Moscowite	Moscowite
Moscow, Russia	Muscovite	Muscovite
Muğla	Mughlanian	Mughlanian
Mumbai	Mumbai	Mumbaikar
Muncie	Munsonian	Munsonian
Munich	Münchner, Münchener	Münchner, Münchener
Murmansk	Murmanskian	Murmanskian
Muscat	Muscati	Muscati
Muzaffarabad	Muzaffarabadi	Muzaffarabadi
Mymensingh	Mymensinghi	Mymensinghi, Mymensinghiya, Mymensinghiyo
Mysore	Mysorean	Mysorean, Mysurinavaru, Mysuriga
Naga	Nagueño	Nagueño
Nagasaki	Nagasakian	Nagasakian
Nagoya	Nagoyan	Nagoyan
Nairobi	Nairobian	Nairobian
Nanaimo	Nanaimoite	Nanaimoite
Nanjing (Nanking)	Nanjingese, Nankinese	Nanjingese, Nankinese
Napier	Napieran	Napieran, Naperian
Naples	Neapolitan	Neapolitan
Nashua	Nashuan	Nashuan
Nashville	Nashvillian	Nashvillian
Nassau	Nassuvian	Nassuvian
Navarre	Navarrian	Navarrian
Naypyidaw	Naypyidawan	Naypyidawan
Nazareth	Nazarene	Nazarene
Nelson	Nelsonian	Nelsonian
Netanya	Netanyan, Netanian	Netanyan, Netanian
New Orleans	New Orleanian	New Orleanian, New Orleaner, Yat
New York City	New Yorker	New Yorker, Knickerbocker
•The Bronx	Bronxite	Bronxite, Bronxer
•Brooklyn	Brooklynite	Brooklynite, Trolley Dodger (archaic)
•Manhattan	Manhattanite	Manhattanite
•Queens	Queensite	Queensite
•Staten Island (Note: Formerly Richmond.)	Staten Islander	Staten Islander
Newark, California	Newarker, Newarkese	Newarker, Newarkese
Newark, New Jersey	Newarker	Newarker
Newcastle	Novocastrian	Novocastrian
Newcastle upon Tyne	Novocastrian, Geordie	Novocastrian, Geordie
Newport	Newportonian	Newportonian, Newporter
Nice	Niçois	Niçois
Nicosia	Nicosian	Nicosian
Nizhny Novgorod	Nizhegorodian	Nizhegorodian
Norfolk	Norfolker, Norfolkian	Norfolker, Norfolkian
Northampton	Northamptonian	Northamptonian
Norwich	Norvician	Norvician
Nome	Nomeite, Noman	Nomeite, Noman
Novara	Novarese	Novarese
Novi Sad	Novosađanin (m), Novosađanka (f)	Novosađanin (m), Novosađanka (f)
Novosibirsk	Novosibirskite	Novosibirskite
Nuku'alofa	Nuku'alofan	Nuku'alofan
Nuremberg	Nuremberger, Nürnberger	Nuremberger, Nürnberger
Nusantara	Nusantaran	Nusantaran
Nuuk	Nuummioq (sg), Nuummiut (pl)	Nuummioq (sg), Nuummiut (pl)
Oakbank	Oakbankian	Oakbankian
Oakland	Oaklander	Oaklander
Oamaru	Oamaru, Oamaruvian	Oamaruvian
Oaxaca	Oaxacan	Oaxaqueño
Odesa	Odesan, Odesite, Odessan, Odessite	Odesan, Odesite, Odessan, Odessite, Odesyt (m), Odesytka (f)
Oklahoma City	Oklahoma Cityan, Oklahoma Citian	Oklahoma Cityan, Oklahoma Citian
Olympia	Olympian	Olympian
Omaha	Omahan	Omahan
Omak	Omakian	Omakian
Ontario	Ontarian	Ontarian
Orange	Oranger	Oranger
Oranjestad	Oranjestader	Oranjestader
Ordu	Ordunite	Ordunite
Orlando	Orlandoan	Orlandoan
Orléans	Orléanais	Orléanais
Osaka	Osakan	Naniwakko, Osakan
Oshawa	Oshawian	Oshawian
Oslo	Oslovian	Oslovian, Osloer
Oswestry	Oswestrian	Oswestrian
Ottawa	Ottawan	Ottawan
Oviedo	Oviedan	Oviedan
Oxford	Oxonian (Note: Also used to identify graduates of the University of Oxford.)	Oxonian
Oxnard	Oxnardian	Oxnardian
Paddock Lake	Paddock Laker	Paddock Laker
Padua	Paduan	Paduan
Paducah	Paducahan	Paducahan
Pago Pago	Pago Pagoan	Pago Pagoan
Paita	Paiteño (m), Paiteña (f)	Paiteño (m), Paiteña (f)
Panaji	Panjimite	Ponnjekar, Panjimite
Papeete	Papeetian	Papeetian
Paphos	Paphian	Paphian
Palermo	Palermitan	Palermitan
Palm Springs	Palm Springer	Palm Springer
Palmerston North	Palmerstonian	Palmerstonian
Palmyra	Palmyrene	Palmyrene
Paramaribo	Paramariban	Paramariban
Paris	Parisian	Parisian
Parma	Parmesan	Parmesan
Pasig	Pasigueño	Pasigueño
Penang	Penangite	Penangite
Pensacola	Pensacolian	Pensacolian
Pescara	Pescarese	Pescarese
Perm	Permian	Permian
Perris	Perrisite	Perrisite
Perth	Perthite, Perthian, Perthling, Perthonality, Pertho, Perthie	Perthite, Perthian, Perthling, Perthonality, Perthette
Perugia	Perugian	Perugian
Peterborough	Peterbourian	Peterbourian
Petrozavodsk	Petrozavodskian	Petrozavodskian
Philadelphia	Philadelphian	Philadelphian
Phnom Penh	Phnom Penh	Phnom Penher
Phoenix	Phoenician, Phoenixer	Phoenician, Phoenixer
Pierre	Pierrean	Pierrean
Pisa	Pisan	Pisan
Pissouri	Pissouriti	Pissouriti
Pittsburgh	Pittsburgher	Pittsburgher, Yinzer
Plymouth	Plymothian	Plymothian, Janner
Pohang	Pohang	Pohangite
Polmont	Polmontarian	Polmontarian
Pompeii	Pompeian, Pompeiian	Pompeian, Pompeiian
Ponferrada	Ponferradian	Ponferradian
Pont-à-Mousson	Mussipontain	Mussipontain
Port-au-Prince	Port-au-Princien	Port-au-Princien
Port Harcourt	Harcourtian, Port Harcourtian	Harcourtian, Port Harcourtian
Port Moresby	Port Moresbian	Port Moresbian
Porto	Portuense	Portuense, Tripeiro
Podgorica	Podgorician	Podgorician
Porto Alegre	Porto-alegrense	Porto-alegrense
Porto Cheli	Porto-Cheliki	Porto-Cheliki
Portland	Portlander	Portlander, Portlandite
Portsmouth	Portsmouthian	Portsmouthian
Potsdam	Potsdamer	Potsdamer
Prague	Praguer	Praguer
Preston	Prestonian	Prestonian
Pretoria	Pretoria	Pretorian
Pripyat	Pripyatin	Pripyatin
Pristina	Prishtinali, Prishtina, Prištinci, Prištevci	Prishtinali, Prishtina, Prištinci, Prištevci
Providence	Providentian	Providentian
Provo	Provoan	Provoan
Pskov	Pskovian	Pskovian
Puebla	Poblano	Poblano
Pune	Puneri	Punekar
Punta Arenas	Puntarenian	Puntarenian
Pylos	Pylian	Pylian
Pyongyang	Pyongyangite	Pyongyangite
Quebec City	Québécois (Note: Often confused with residents of the Province of Québec. If it is necessary to distinguish between residents of the city and the province, French-speakers will use québécois/e de Québec for the city and québécois/e du Québec for the province.)	Québécois
Quetzaltenango	Quetzalteco (m), Quetzalteca (f)	Quetzalteco (m), Quetzalteca (f)
Quezon City	Quezonian	Quezonian, Taga-QC, Taga-Quezon City
Quito	Quitonian	Quiteño (m), Quiteña (f)
Rabat	Rabati	Rabati
Radnor	Radnorian	Radnorian
Rajshahi	Rajshahiyo	Rajshahiya, Rajshahiyo
Raleigh	Raleighite	Raleighite
Ramallah	Ramallahi	Ramallahi
Rancho Cucamonga	Cucamongan, Cucamonguense, Cucamongueño (m), Cucamongueña (f)	Cucamongan, Cucamonguense, Cucamongueño (m), Cucamongueña (f)
Randall	Randallite	Randallite
Rangpur City	Rangpuri	Rongpuri, Rangpuri
Ras Al Khaimah	Khaimahnese	Khaimahnese
Reading	Readingite	Readingite
Red Deer	Red Deerian	Red Deerian
Redwood City	Redwood Citian	Redwood Citian
Regina	Regina, Reginan	Reginan
Rennes	Rennais (m), Rennaise (f)	Rennais (m), Rennaise (f)
Reno	Renoite	Renoite, Riennese, Renal
Rethymno	Rethymnian	Rethymnian
Reims (Rheims)	Rémois, Cornichon	Rémois
Reykjavík	Reykjavikian, Reykjaviker	Reykjavikian, Reykjaviker
Rialto	Rialtan	Rialtan
Ribeirão Preto	Ribeirão Pretano	Ribeirão Pretano
Richmond	Richmonder	Richmonder
Riga	Rigan	Rigan
Rio de Janeiro	Carioca	Carioca
Riverside	Riversider	Riversider
Riyadh	Riyadhi	Riyadhi (m), Riyadhiyah (f)
Rhodes	Rhodian	Rhodian
Roanoke	Roanoker	Roanoker
Rochester, Kent	Roffensian, Rochesterian	Roffensian
Rochester, New York	Rochesterian	Rochesterian
Rock Island	Rock Islander	Rock Islander
Rockford	Rockfordian	Rockfordian
Rockhampton	Rockhampton	Rockhamptonite
Rome	Roman	Roman
Roseville	Rosevillian	Rosevillian
Rostov-on-Don	Rostovite	Rostovite
Rotorua	Rotoruan	Rotoruan
Rotterdam	Rotter	Rotterdammer
Rouen	Rouennais	Rouennais
Rye	Ryer	Ryer, Mudhead
Saarbrücken	Saarbrückener	Saarbrückener
Sacramento	Sacramentan	Sacramentan
Saint Helier	Saint-Helian	Saint-Helian
Saint-Étienne	Stéphanois	Stéphanois
Saint-Jude	Rocquevillois	Rocquevillois
Saint Paul	Saint Paulite, St. Paulite	Saint Paulite, St. Paulite
Saint Petersburg, Russia	Saint Petersburgian	Saint Petersburgian, Saint Petersburger, Petersburger
Salem	Salemite	Salemite
Salerno	Salernitan	Salernitan
Salford	Salfordian	Salfordian
Salt Lake City	Salt Laker	Salt Laker
Salvador	Soteropolitano	Soteropolitano
Salzburg	Salzburger	Salzburger
Samarkand	Samarkandi, Samarkandian	Samarkandi, Samarkandian
Sambalpur	Sambalpuria	Sambalpuria
Samsun	Samsunite	Samsunite
San Antonio	San Antonian	San Antonian
San Bernardino	San Bernardinian	San Bernardinian
San Diego	San Diegan	San Diegan
San Francisco	San Franciscan	San Franciscan
San Jose	San Josean	San Josean
San José	Josefino (m), Josefina (f), San Josefinan	Josefino (m), Josefina (f)
San Juan	Sanjuanero (m), Sanjuanera (f)	Sanjuanero (m), Sanjuanera (f)
San Leandro	San Leandran	San Leandran
San Marino	Sammarinese	Sammarinese
San Salvador	Sansalvadoran, Sansalvadoreño (m) Sansalvadoreña (f), Capitalino (m), Capitalana (f)	Sansalvadoran, Sansalvadoreño (m) Sansalvadoreña (f), Capitalino (m), Capitalana (f)
Sanaa	Sanaani, San'ani	Sanaani, San'ani
Şanlıurfa	Urfanian	Urfanian
Santa Ana	Santanero (m), Santanera (f)	Santanero (m), Santanera (f)
Santa Barbara	Santa Barbarian	Santa Barbaran
Santa Clara	Santa Claran	Santa Claran
Santa Clarita	Santa Claritan	Santa Claritan
Santa Cruz de la Sierra	Cruceño	Cruceño
Santa Cruz de Tenerife	Santacrucero, Chicharrero	Santacrucero, Chicharrero
Santa Fe	Santa Fean, Santafesino, -na	Santa Fean, Santafesino, -na
Santa Monica	Santa Monican	Santa Monican
Santa Rosa	Santa Rosan	Santa Rosan
Santiago	Santiaguinos (m), Santiaguinas (f)	Santiaguinos (m), Santiaguinas (f)
Santiago de Compostela	Santiagan, Santiagués (m), Santiaguesa (f), Compostelán (m), Compostelána (f), Compostelano (m), Compostelana (f)	Santiagan, Santiagués (m), Santiaguesa (f), Compostelán (m), Compostelána (f), Compostelano (m), Compostelana (f)
São Carlos	Sãocarlense, Carlopolitano	Sãocarlense, Carlopolitano
São Luís	Ludovicense	Ludovicense
São Paulo	Paulistano	Paulistano
Sapporo	Sapporoko	Sapporokko
Sarajevo	Sarajevan	Sarajevan
Saskatoon	Saskatoon, Saskatonian	Saskatonian, Saskabusher
Sault Ste. Marie	Sooite, Saultite	Soos
Savannah	Savannian	Savannian
Seattle	Seattleite	Seattleite
Sendai	Sendaikko	Sendaikko
Seoul	Seoulite	Seoulite
Serra Negra	Serrano	Serrano
Serres	Serrean	Serrean
Sevastopol	Sevastopolitan, Sevastopolian	Sevastopolitan, Sevastopolian
Seville	Sevillian, Sevillano, Hispalense	Sevillian, Sevillano, Hispalense
Shanghai	Shanghainese	Shanghainese, Shanghailander
Sharjah	Sharjahnese, Sharjawi	Sharjahnese, Sharjawi
Sheffield	Sheffielder	Sheffielder
Shillong	Shillongite, Nong-Shillong, Nongsor	Shillongite, Nong-Shillong, Nongsor
Shkodër	Shkodran	Shkodran
Shrewsbury	Salopian	Salopian
Side	Sidetan	Sidetan
Siena (Sienna)	Sienese, Siennese	Sienese, Siennese
Silver Lake	Silver Laker	Silver Laker
Simferopol	Simferopolitan	Simferopolitan
Simi Valley	Simivian	Simivian
Singapore	Singaporean	Singaporean
Sitka	Sitkan	Sitkan
Skopje	Skopjan	Skopjan
Sligo	Sligonian	Sligonian, Sligoman
Slough	Sluff	Sluff
Sofia	Sofian	Sofian
Solihull	Silhillian	Silhillian
Somers	Somersite	Somersite
Sorrento	Sorrentine	Sorrentine
Sorsogon	Sorsoganon	Sorsoganon
Southampton	Sotonian	Sotonian
Soweto	Sowetan	Sowetan
Sparta	Spartan	Spartan
Spokane	Spokanite	Spokanite
Spoleto	Spoletian	Spoletian, Spoletini
Springfield, Illinois	Springfielder	Springfielder
Springfield, Missouri	Springfieldian	Springfieldian
Srinagar	Srinagari, Sirinagari, Sirinagaruk, Shaharuk, Srinagarite	Srinagari, Sirinagari, Sirinagaruk, Shaharuk, Srinagarite
St. John's	Townie	Townie
St. Louis	St. Louisan, Saint Louisan	St. Louisan, Saint Louisan
St. Petersburg, Florida	St. Petersburgite, St. Petian	St. Petersburgite, St. Petian
Stockholm	Stockholmer	Stockholmer
Strasbourg	Strasbourgeois	Strasbourgeois
Stuttgart	Stuttgarter	Stuttgarter
Sucre	Sucrense	Sucrense
Sunderland	Mackem	Mackem
Sunshine Coast	Sunshine Coast	Sunshine Coaster
Suva	Suvan	Suvan
Suwayda	Suwaydawi	Suwaidawi
Suzhou	Suzhounese	Suzhounese
Swansea	Jack	Jack
Swindon	Swindonian	Swindonian
Sydney	Sydnese	Sydneysider, Sydnese
Sylhet	Sylheti	Sylheti, Siloti, Sileti
Syracuse, Italy	Syracusan	Syracusan
Syracuse, New York	Syracusian	Syracusian
Tabaco	Tabaqueño	Tabaqueño
Tacna	Tacneño (m), Tacneña (f)	Tacneño (m), Tacneña (f)
Tacoma	Tacoman	Tacoman
Taguig	Taguigeño	Taguigeño
Taipei	Taipeian	Taipeian
Tallahassee	Tallahasseean	Tallahasseean
Tallinn	Tallinner	Tallinner
Tampa	Tampan, Tampanian, Tampeño	Tampan, Tampanian, Tampeño (m), Tampeña (f)
Tangier	Tanjawi, Tangierian	Tanjawi, Tangierian
Tartu	Tartuan	Tartuan
Taranto	Tarantine, Tarentine	Tarantine, Tarentine
Tashkent	Tashkenti, Tashkentian	Tashkenti, Tashkentian, Tahkenter
Taunton	Tauntonian	Tauntonian
Tauranga	Taurangan	Taurangian, Taurangan
Tbilisi	Tbilisian	Tbilisian, Tbiliselebi
Tegucigalpa	Tegucigalpense, Comayagüelense, Capitalino(m) Capitalina (f)	Tegucigalpense, Comayagüelense, Capitalino(m) Capitalina (f)
Tehran	Tehrani	Tehrani
Tekirdağ	Tekirdanian	Tekirdaninan
Tel Aviv	Tel Avivian	Tel Avivi, Tel Avivian
Temecula	Temeculan, Temeculese	Temeculan, Temeculese
The Hague	Hagenaar	Hagenaar
Thebes	Theban	Theban
Thessaloniki	Thessalonian	Thessalonian
Thimphu	Thimphuese	Thimphuese
Thunder Bay	Thunderbite	Thunderbite
Tianjin	Tianjinese	Tianjinese
Timaru	Timaru, Timaruvian	Timaruvians
Timișoara	Timișorean	Timișorean
Tirana	Tiranas, Tirano (Italian)	Tirons
Tiraspol	Tiraspolitan	Tiraspolitan
Tokyo	Tokyoite	Edokko, Tokyoite
Toowoomba	Toowoomban	Toowoomban
Topeka	Topekan	Topekan
Toronto	Torontonian	Torontonian
Tórshavn	Tórshavner	Tórshavner
Toulouse	Toulousian	Toulousian
Tournai	Tournaisian	Tournaisian
Townsville	Townsvillian	Townsvillian
Trabzon	Trabzonian, Trebizonian, Trapezian, Trapezuntine	Trabzonian, Trebizonian, Trapezian, Trapezuntine
Traverse City	Traverse Citian	Traverse Citian
Trevor	Trevorite	Trevorite
Trent	Tridentine	Tridentine
Trieste	Triestine	Triestine
Tripoli, Greece	Tripolitano	Tripolitano
Tripoli, Libya	Tripolitan	Tripolitan
Trois-Rivières, Guadeloupe	Trois-rivieran	Trois-rivieran
Trois-Rivières, Quebec	Trifluvien, Trifluvienne, Trifluvian	Trifluvien, Trifluvienne, Trifluvian
Truro	Truronian	Truronian
Tucson	Tucsonian	Tucsonian, Tucsonan
Tulsa	Tulsan	Tulsan
Tunis	Tunisois	Tunisois
Turin	Turinese	Turinese
Twin Lakes	Twin Laker	Twin Laker
Tyre	Tyrian	Tyrian
Uberlândia	Uberlandense	Uberlandense
Ufa	Ufan	Ufan
Ulaanbaatar	Ulaanbaatarian	Ulaanbaatarian
Ulsan	Ulsan, Ulsanian	Ulsanian
Umm Al Quwain	Quwainese, Qewani	Quwainese, Qewani
Unalaska	Unalaskan	Unalaskan
Union City	Union Citian	Union Citian
Ushuaia	Ushuaiense	Ushuaiense
Utica	Utican	Utican
Vacaville	Vacavillian	Vacavillian
Vaduz	Vaduzer	Vaduzer
Valencia	Valencian	Valencian
Valladolid	Vallisoletano, Pucelano, Pinciano	Vallisoletano, Pucelano, Pinciano
Valletta	Vallettan	Vallettan
Valparaíso	Porteño (m), Porteña (f)	Porteño (m), Porteña (f)
Van	Vanian	Vanian
Vancouver, British Columbia	Vancouverite	Vancouverite
Vancouver, Washington	Vancouverite	Vancouverite
Veliky Novgorod	Novgorodian	Novgorodian
Venice	Venetian	Venetian
Ventura	Venturan	Venturan
Veracruz	Veracruzano	Veracruzano, Jarocho
Verona	Veronese	Veronese
Vicenza	Vicentine	Vicentine
Vichy	Vichyssois	Vichyssois
Victoria	Victorian	Victorian
Victorville	Victorvillian	Victorvillian
Vienna	Viennese, Wiener	Viennese, Wiener
Villanova	Villanovan	Villanovan
Ville Platte	Ville Platian	Ville Platian
Vilnius	Vilnian	Vilnian
Vitoria-Gasteiz	Gasteiztar, Vitoriano (m), Vitoriana (f)	Gasteiztar, Vitoriano (m), Vitoriana (f)
Vizag	Vizagite	Vizagite
Vladivostok	Vladivostokian	Vladivostokian
Volgograd	Volgogradian	Volgogradian
Waco	Wacoite	Wacoite
Warangal	Warangalite	Warangalite
Warsaw	Varsovian	Varsovian
Washington, D.C.	Washingtonian (Note: Not to be confused with the inhabitants of Washington state.)	Washingtonian
Waterbury	Waterburian	Waterburian
Waterford	Waterfordian	Waterfordian, Déise, Suirsider
Waterloo	Waterluvian	Waterluvian
Wellington	Wellington, Wellingtonian	Wellingtonian
Wheatland	Wheatlander	Wheatlander
Whitehorse	Whitehorser, Whitehorsian	Whitehorser, Whitehorsian
Whittier	Whittierite, Whittierese	Whittierite, Whittierese
Wichita	Wichitan	Wichitan
Willemstad	Willemstader	Willemstader
Wilmot	Wilmotter	Wilmotter
Winchester	Wintonian	Wintonian
Winnipeg	Winnipegger	Winnipegger
Wolverhampton	Wulfrunian	Wulfrunian
Wuhan	Wuhanese	Wuhanese
Wythenshawe	Wythenshavian	Wythenshavian
Xalapa	Xalapeño (m), Xalapeña (f)	Xalapeño (m), Xalapeña (f)
Xanthi	Xanthian	Xanthian
Xi'an	Xi'anese	Xi'anese
Yakutsk	Yakutskian	Yakutskian
Yamoussoukro	Yamoussoukrois	Yamoussoukrois
Yangon	Yangonite	Yangonite
Yaroslavl	Yaroslavlian	Yaroslavlian
Yellowknife	Yellowknifer	Yellowknifer
Yeosu	Yeosu, Yeosuite	Yeosuite
Yerevan	Yerevantsi	Yerevantsi
Yogyakarta	Yogyakartan, Jogjan	Yogyakartan, Jogjan
Yokohama	Yokohaman	Hamakko
York	Yorkie, Old Yorker	Yorkie, Old Yorker
Zacatecas	Zacatecan	Zacatecano
Zagreb	Zagrebian	Zagreber, Zagrebian
Zamboanga	Zamboangueño	Zamboangueño
Zaporizhzhia	Zaporizhian	Zaporizhian
Zaragoza	Zaragozan, Saragossan	Zaragoazan, Saragossan
Zhengzhou	Zhengzhounese	Zhengzhounese
Zintan	Zintani	Zintani
Zonguldak	Zonguldaki	Zonguldakian
Zurich	Zuricher, Zürcher	Zuricher, Zürcher
Zwolle	Zwollenaar	Zwollenaar

== See also ==
- Demonym
  - List of adjectival and demonymic forms of place names
    - List of adjectivals and demonyms for astronomical bodies
    - List of adjectivals and demonyms for continental regions
      - List of adjectivals and demonyms for subcontinental regions
    - List of adjectival and demonymic forms for countries and nations
      - List of adjectivals and demonyms for Australia
      - List of adjectivals and demonyms for Canada
      - List of adjectivals and demonyms for India
      - List of adjectivals and demonyms for Malaysia
      - List of adjectivals and demonyms for Mexico
      - List of adjectivals and demonyms for New Zealand
      - List of adjectivals and demonyms for the Philippines
      - List of adjectivals and demonyms for the United States
    - List of adjectivals and demonyms for cities
      - List of adjectivals and demonyms for Colorado cities
    - List of adjectivals and demonyms for former regions
      - List of adjectivals and demonyms for Greco-Roman antiquity
    - List of adjectivals and demonyms for fictional regions
- Lists of city nicknames
