= Noun (disambiguation) =

Noun is one of the parts of speech.

Noun or Nouns may also refer to:

- Noun (department), a division of the West province in Cameroon
- Noun River (Cameroon)
- Noun River (Morocco)
- Nouns (album), an album by No Age
- Noun (band), the solo project of Screaming Females guitarist Marissa Paternoster
  - Noun (EP)
- Noun, instruction type for Apollo Guidance Computer (AGC)
- National Open University of Nigeria
- The Noun Project
- "Nouns", a song by They Might Be Giants from the album Nanobots
