= Remans =

Remans is a surname. Notable people with the surname include:

- Mart Remans (born 1998), Dutch footballer
- Sky Remans (born 2010), Belgian snowboarder

== See also ==
- Kingdom of Reman
- List of Star Trek aliens#Reman
