= List of words derived from toponyms =

This is a list of English language words derived from toponyms, followed by the place name it derives from.

== General ==
- agate — after Achates, ancient Greek name for the river Dirillo on the Italian island of Sicily
- Alberta clipper — a weather phenomenon named after the Canadian province of Alberta, where it originates
- Angora goat, Angora rabbit, Angora wool (obtained from the previous two), Angora cat — named after Angora, variant or former name of Ankara, their place of origin
- Antimacassar — after Makassar, Indonesia, which was the source of hair oil
- Armageddon — after "mount of Megiddo", where the battle was to be fought according to myth
- badminton — after Badminton in Gloucestershire, England
- balkanization — after the Balkans, region in southeastern Europe similarly divided into small nations in the twentieth century
- bangalored — after Bangalore, India; used often in the US when jobs are lost because of outsourcing; first time use by the magazine The Economist; usage: "He is sulking today because he got bangalored."
- Bedford cord, a heavy fabric with a ribbed weave similar to corduroy; named after either Bedford, England or possibly New Bedford, Massachusetts
- Bedlam — meaning pandemonium, after popular name/pronunciation of St Mary of Bethlehem, London's first psychiatric hospital
- Bedlington Terrier, a breed of dog, after Bedlington, UK
- bezant — former gold coin, and current heraldic charge, after Byzantium (now Istanbul), where the coins were made
- bikini — two-piece bathing suit for women, after Bikini Atoll in the Marshall Islands, where atomic bombs were tested in 1946; supposedly analogous to the "explosive" effect on the male libido
- the Blarney and Blarney Stone — Blarney Castle
- Boeotian, an ancient Greek term for a fool, after the Boeotian people
- bohemian — term referring to artists, writers, and other people who wished to live an unconventional, vagabond, or "gypsy" lifestyle; from Bohemia, where "gypsies" were erroneously thought to originate; see also gypsy, below
- La Brabançonne, national anthem of Belgium — Brabant, province of Belgium
- Bronx cheer — a noise made by the mouth to signify derision; after The Bronx, a borough of New York City
- brummagem — goods of shoddy quality; from a local pronunciation of Birmingham, city in the United Kingdom
- bungalow — a low building or house, from a Gujarati word meaning "Bengalese", used elliptically to mean a house built in the style of Bengal
- Byzantine, used to describe any work, law, or organization that is excessively complex or difficult to understand, named after Byzantine Empire
- calico — a type of cloth named after Calicut, where Europeans first obtained it; Calico cat and calico horse derive from the appearance of their mottled coat suggesting calico cloth
- canary — a small yellow bird, originating on and named after the Canary Islands, specifically the largest island, Gran Canaria, called in Latin Insula Canaria, "island of dogs", after the wild native dogs found there
- Capri pants — mid-calf pants named for the Italian isle of Capri, where they rose to popularity in the late 1950s and early '60s.
- Caucasian — name for the "white race", coined by anthropologist Johann Blumenbach after Caucasus Mountains, their supposed ancestral homeland
- chautauqua — a form of local fair, after Chautauqua, New York, where the first one was held
- Chicago Typewriter, a nickname for the Thompson submachine gun
- chihuahua — small dog from Chihuahua, state of Mexico
- china — originally chinaware, as in "wares from China"
- Chinese wall, artificial organizational barrier, derived from Great Wall of China
- coach — a type of carriage, ultimately from Hungarian kocsi (szekér) or "carriage of Kocs", where this vehicle was first made
- Coldstream Guards — regiment founded at Coldstream in Scotland
- cologne — a perfume originating from Cologne, Germany.
- Corinthian order — one of the three orders of classical architecture, after Corinth in Greece
- Coventry (in the construction "Send to Coventry"): shunned by friends and family, after the treatment of Royalist prisoners during the English Civil War
- Dalmatian dog - a breed of dog, from Dalmatia
- Damask — material, from Damascus
- denim — a coarse cotton fabric, from French serge de Nîmes, or "serge of Nîmes", where the cloth originated
- derby — a stakes race limited to three-year-old steeds, named after Derby in England by way of its 12th Earl; also refers to a style of shoe and hat.
- dollar — a unit of currency, originally from the German taler, an abbreviation of Joachimstaler ("gulden of Joachimstal"), a coin minted (1519) from silver mined near Joachimsthal, Bohemia
- donnybrook — colloquial term for a brawl or fracas, derived from Donnybrook Fair, an annual horse fair in the Dublin suburb notorious for fighting and drunkenness
- doolally or dolally — an adjective meaning "mad" or "eccentric" (e.g. "to go dolally"), ultimately named after Deolali, a hill station near Nashik in colonial India, referring to the apparent madness of men waiting to return to Britain after their tour of duty
- duffel or duffle — heavy woollen cloth, hence duffel coat and duffel bag; after Duffel, a town in Belgium where it was first made
- Dunkirk spirit, after the evacuation of Dunkirk in World War II
- Estrela Mountain Dog — Estrela Mountains, where this dog breed is originally from
- Fez, (also called tarboosh), a hat — Fez, a city in Morocco
- Finlandization, the influence a large country can have on a smaller one, after Finland
- gauze, a thin translucent open-weave fabric⏤after the city of Gaza, which is where it is thought to have originated.
- gamboge, a yellow artist's pigment — Cambodge, French name for Cambodia
- geyser, a hot water spring — Geysir in Iceland
- Glasgow kiss, a slang term meaning headbutt — Glasgow, Scotland
- Greek, not understandable ("all Greek to me") — Greek language of Greece
- Guinea, former British gold coin, and guineafowl — Guinea region of West Africa
- Gypsies, nomadic peoples in Europe and United States — Egypt
- Habanera — a musical style named after Havana, Cuba
- Hackney carriage, name for the London taxicab, probably from Hackney in London, England
- Havana, cigar — from capital of Cuba
- Hempenstall, a surname, after the town of Heptonstall (England)
- Honiton, a form of lace, after the town in Devon (England) where it is produced
- Holland, cotton or linen fabric — Holland
- iliad — a long narrative poem, or a series of woes, trials, etc.; both derive from the Homeric epic Iliad, literally meaning "of Ilium" (or Troy)
- Indian, the aboriginal peoples of the New World, after India
- Indigo, colour of indigo dye, after India
- Ionic order — one of the three orders of classical architecture, after Ionia in present-day Turkey
- japanning, application of lacquer, after Japan
- Jeans, denim trousers; Genoa
- Jersey cattle (also tomato, milk, cream, jumper) — Jersey, one of the Channel Islands
- Kimblewick bit, used on horses for riding — Kimble Wick, hamlet in Buckinghamshire (England)
- Labyrinth, maze, after a legendary structure on Crete
- Laconic, (of a person, speech, or style of writing) using very few words. From Laconia Ancient Sparta (Greece)
- Left Bank, style of life, fashion, or "look" — "Left Bank", left bank of the Seine (facing downstream) in Paris
- Leghorn chicken — after Leghorn, historical name for Livorno, Italy
- Lesbian, female homosexual — Lesbos, island in Greece
- Lipizzaner, a breed of horse — Lipica, town in Slovenia
- Magenta, colour — named after Magenta, Lombardy, Italy
- Marathon, long race — Marathon, Greece, town
- Madras, lightweight cotton fabric — Madras, old name for Chennai, coastal city in southeastern India
- Manila envelopes, Manila fiber — Manila, city in Philippines
- Marseillaise, national anthem of France — Marseille, city in France
- Masada, a mass suicide when conditions are hopeless, after Masada, Israel
- Mausoleum, a large and impressive tomb — Mausoleum at Halicarnassus in Turkey
- meander, a bend in a river — Meander, a river in Turkey
- Mecca, ultimate destination or activity center — Mecca, holy city in Saudi Arabia
- Mongoloid race — Mongolia, country in central Asia
- Morocco leather — Morocco, country in north Africa
- Muslin, a lightweight fabric — Mosul, Iraq
- Neanderthal man, known by his fossils — Neanderthal, Germany, valley where the fossils were found
- Nicene Creed, Christian doctrine — Nicaea, old name for İznik in Turkey
- Olympics, worldwide games — Mount Olympus, tallest mountain in Greece
- Ottoman (furniture), a type of stool — after the Ottoman Empire
- Paisley (design), used in shawls — Paisley, Scotland
- Panama hat — Panama in Central America, where it was first sold
- Portland cement — named after the Isle of Portland, England
- Rubicon, the point of no return — Rubicon (or Rubico), a small former river in northern Italy
- Rhode Island Red — Chicken named after Rhode Island
- Rugby football — Rugby School, in Rugby, Warwickshire, central England
- Shanghaied — drugged and forced into service aboard a ship, from Shanghai, China
- Siamese twins, conjoined twins — Siam, old name for Thailand
- Siberia, a remote undesirable location — Siberia, in eastern Russia
- Skid Row, originally Skid Road of Seattle, now the rundown area of a U.S. city
- Sodomy, forbidden sexual acts — Sodom, Biblical town on the plain of the Dead Sea
- Solecism, incorrect or ungrammatical usage of language — Soli an ancient city in Cilicia, where a dialect of Greek regarded as substandard was spoken
- Spa, place having water with health-giving properties — Spa, a town in Belgium, also famous for its motor racing circuit.
- Suede, a durable fabric — French name for Sweden
- Surrey, horse-drawn carriage — Surrey, a county in southern England
- Timbuktu, metaphor for an exotic, distant land — Timbuktu, city on the Niger River in Mali, West Africa
- Trojan horse, malicious computer virus — Trojan Horse, of Troy, from the Iliad
- turkey, from Turkey
- tuxedo, after Tuxedo Park, New York
- Vaudeville, after the Vau de Vire the setting for the bawdy songs of Olivier Basselin.
- volcano, from Italian island of Vulcano
- Xanadu, a symbol of opulence — Xanadu (or Shangdu), summer capital of Kublai Khan's empire

== Events and agreements ==
- Abu Ghraib (Iraq) – the Abu Ghraib torture and prisoner abuse scandal in 2003
- Arraiolos — Arraiolos Group
- Attica (New York) – the Attica Prison riots in 1971
- Beijing (China) – the Fourth World Conference on Women in 1994
- Brest (Belarus) – the Treaty of Brest-Litovsk in 1918
- Bretton Woods (New Hampshire) – The Bretton Woods system from 1944
- Cairo (Egypt) – the International Conference on Population and Development of 1994
- Camp David (U.S. presidential retreat in Maryland) – the Camp David Accords of 1978 and the Camp David 2000 Summit
- Copenhagen (Denmark) – the World Summit for Social Development in 1995
- Dayton (Ohio) – the Dayton Peace Agreement in 1995
- Doha (Qatar) – the Doha round of World Trade Organization negotiations that began in 2001
- Durban (South Africa) – the World Conference against Racism in 2001
- Geneva (Switzerland) – the Geneva Conventions, and the unofficial Geneva Accord negotiations of 2003
- Gleneagles (Scotland) – the 31st G8 summit in Gleneagles, Scotland
- Grand Trianon (a château in France) – the Treaty of Trianon in 1919
- Hillsborough (Sheffield, England) – the Hillsborough disaster of 1989
- Hiroshima (Japan) – the atomic bombing of Hiroshima in 1945
- Jackson State (Mississippi) – the Jackson State killings in 1970
- Kent State (Ohio) – the Kent State shootings in 1970
- Kyoto (Japan) – the Kyoto Protocol of 1997
- Lisbon — the Tresty of Lisbon of 2007
- Locarno (Switzerland) – the Locarno Treaties of 1925
- Lockerbie (Scotland) – the Lockerbie bombing of 1988
- Maastricht (The Netherlands) – the Maastricht Treaty of 1992
- Marrakesh (Morocco) – the Marrakesh Agreement of 1994 establishing the World Trade Organization
- Munich (Germany) – the Munich Agreement of 1938 and the Munich Massacre at the 1972 Summer Olympics
- Nantes – the Edict of Nantes in 1598
- My Lai (Vietnam) – the My Lai Massacre of 1968
- Nuremberg (Germany) – the Nuremberg Trials of 1945 to 1949
- Oslo (Norway) – the Oslo Accords of 1993
- Portsmouth (New Hampshire) – the Treaty of Portsmouth in 1905 (not Portsmouth, England)
- Potsdam (Germany) – the Potsdam Conference in 1945
- Pugwash (Canada) – the Pugwash Conferences
- Rio de Janeiro (Brazil) – site of the Earth Summit, officially the United Nations Conference on Environment and Development (UNCED) of 1992
- Saint-Germain-en-Laye (a château in France) – the Treaty of Saint-Germain-en-Laye in 1919
- San Stefano (now Yeşilköy, Turkey) – the Treaty of San Stefano in 1878
- Schengen (Luxembourg) – the Schengen treaty of 1985
- Seattle (Washington) – the WTO Meeting of 1999 in Seattle
- Tordesillas (Spain) – the Treaty of Tordesillas in 1494
- Trafalgar (a headland in Spain) – the Battle of Trafalgar in 1805
- Uruguay – the Uruguay Round of trade negotiations from 1986 to 1994 that transformed the General Agreement on Tariffs and Trade (GATT) into the World Trade Organization (WTO)
- Versailles (France) – the Treaty of Versailles in 1919
- Yalta (Ukraine) – the Yalta Conference in 1945
- Warsaw (Poland) – the Warsaw Pact (1955–1991)
- Waterloo (Belgium) – the Battle of Waterloo in 1815
- Watergate (office building in Washington, D.C.) – the Watergate scandal of 1972 to 1975
- Woodstock (New York) – the Woodstock Festival in 1969
- Worms – the Concordat of Worms in 1122

== Industries and professions ==
- Bay Street — Canada's financial industry (similar to Wall Street), after Bay Street, the main street of Toronto's financial district
- Beltway — the pundits, political leaders, and opinion-makers of Washington, D.C., after the highway surrounding the city
- Broadway — musical theater, after Broadway, a street in New York City
- The City — London-based financial services, after the City of London
- Detroit — the American automobile industry
- Fleet Street — the British press, after the London street that formerly housed many newspapers
- Hollywood — the American motion picture industry, after the district of Los Angeles, California, where many motion picture companies are headquartered
- K Street — lobbying industry working with the U.S. Federal government
- Madison Avenue — advertising industry, after Madison Avenue, a street in New York City where many advertising firms are headquartered
- Savile Row — tailoring, after the street in London where the most prestigious tailors are located
- Wall Street — U.S. financial services industry, after Wall Street, street in New York City where many financial services firms are headquartered

== Food and drink (other than cheese and wine) ==
- Anjou pear — Anjou
- Arbroath smokie (a kind of smoked haddock) — Arbroath in Scotland
- Bakewell Pudding — Bakewell, in Derbyshire, England
- Bath bun — Bath, England
- Bath Oliver (biscuit) — Bath, England
- Berliner (pastry), named after Berlin
- Black Forest gateau, Black Forest cake, Schwarzwälder Kirschtorte — Black Forest (Schwarzwald), Germany
- Bolognese sauce — from Bologna, Italy
- Bombay duck, a kind of fish — Bombay, old name for Mumbai, coastal city in western India
- Brazil nut
- Brussels sprout — after the capital of Belgium
- Buffalo wings, named for Buffalo, New York, where they originated
- Cantaloupe (also called rockmelon), a variety of melon — Cantalupo, multiple communes in Italy
- Ceylon tea — from Ceylon, old name for Sri Lanka
- Chelsea bun — Chelsea in London, England
- Cognac
- Coney Island hot dog — named after Coney Island, New York, but apparently invented in the Midwest of the United States
- Cuban, sub sandwich in Florida — Cuba, country in the Caribbean
- Curaçao liqueur — Curaçao
- Currant, a dried raisin — Corinth in Greece
- Danish, a sweet pastry — (in Denmark it is called wienerbrød, "bread from Vienna")
- Darjeeling tea — Darjeeling in India
- Dijon mustard — named after the French city Dijon
- Dover sole — from Dover, England
- Dublin Bay prawn — from Dublin, Ireland
- Eccles cake — from Eccles, Greater Manchester, England
- Glamorgan sausage a vegetarian sausage, Glamorgan county, Wales -
- Frankfurter (or Wiener — from Vienna)
- Hamburger — Hamburg, Germany
- Hollandaise sauce — Holland
- Jaffa orange — Jaffa
- Jaffa Cakes
- Java, slang for coffee — from island in Indonesia
- Jerusalem artichoke — wrongly associated with Jerusalem
- Kiwifruit — from Kiwi, the national symbol of and a nickname for New Zealand
- Lancashire hotpot — from Lancashire, England
- Lemon & Paeroa — from mineral water springs at the New Zealand town of Paeroa
- Madeira cake — Madeira Islands
- Manhattan cocktail — Manhattan Club in New York City
- Martini — Martinez, California, where the precursor to the martini, the Martinez, was developed
- Mayonnaise — from Mahón, Menorca, Spain
- Mocha coffee, ice cream — Mokha, Yemen, place where the coffee is grown
- Peach — from Persia, old name for Iran
- Peking Duck, a Chinese dish made of duck — Peking, old name for Beijing, China
- Pilsner lager — Plzeň, Czech Republic
- Pomfret Cakes — from Pontefract, Yorkshire, England
- Salisbury steak — Salisbury, England
- Sardine, types of small fish — Sardinia, island in the Mediterranean near Italy
- Seltzer (commercial name), Selters, Germany
- Seville orange — Seville
- Shallot — Ashkelon
- Swede (vegetable) — Sweden; also known as Swedish turnip
- Tabasco sauce — Tabasco, state of Mexico
- Tangerine — from Tangier in Morocco
- Turkish delight — Turkey
- Valencia orange — Valencia, Spain
- Welsh rarebit — A cheese and herb sauce drizzled over hot bread or toast; probably originating from Welsh peasants
- Vichyssoise — Chilled leek and potato soup, named for Vichy, France
- Virginia peanut — Virginia
- Yorkshire puddings from Yorkshire

Note: Saskatoon, Saskatchewan is named after the local Saskatoon berry, rather than vice versa.

== Cheese ==
- Ackawi
- American cheese, a common name for processed cheese
- Asiago after Asiago, the plateau and town in northern Italy where it was first made
- Brie after the Brie region in Île de France, where it was first made
- Caerphilly after Caerphilly, a town in Wales
- Camembert (cheese) chicken Camembert, Orne in France
- Cheddar after Cheddar in Somerset, England, where it was originally made
- Cheshire after Cheshire, a county in England
- Colby after Colby, Wisconsin, where it was first made
- Danbo cheese after Denmark
- Derby cheese after Derbyshire a county in central England
- Dubliner after Dublin, Ireland
- Dunlop after the town of Dunlop in Ayrshire, Scotland
- Edam after town of Edam in the Netherlands
- Emmental after Emmental, the name of a valley in Switzerland where it was originally made
- Double Gloucester cheese after Gloucester cattle, originally from Gloucester in England
- Gorgonzola after Gorgonzola, a village in northern Italy
- Gouda after the city Gouda in the Netherlands where originally made
- Gruyère after Gruyère, a district in Switzerland where first made
- Jarlsberg after the town Jarlsberg in Norway
- Lancashire cheese after Lancashire in England
- Lappi after Lapland region of Finland
- Leicester cheese after Leicester in England
- Limburger after Limburg, a former duchy of Lorraine
- Manchego after La Mancha, Spain
- Molbo, from the Mols peninsula in Jutland, Denmark
- Monterey Jack, from Monterey, California (not Monterrey, Mexico)
- Morbier
- Munster after town Munster, Haut-Rhin in Alsace region of France
- Nablusi
- Neufchâtel, from Neufchâtel-en-Bray, the part of Normandie where it originates
- Oaxaca, after Oaxaca de Juárez, a state and city in Mexico
- Parmesan, from Parma, Italy
- Pouligny-Saint-Pierre cheese, from Pouligny-Saint-Pierre, the place where it originates
- Roma(no) after Rome, Italy
- Roquefort after a village in southern France
- Samsø after the island of Samsø in Denmark
- Stilton after Stilton, a village in England where it was first sold
- Swiss after Switzerland
- Tilsit after a town in East Prussia (now Sovetsk, Russia) where it was first produced
- Wensleydale cheese after Wensleydale in North Yorkshire, England

== Wine ==
- Alsace
- Asti — Asti (province), Italy
- Beaujolais
- Bordeaux
- Burgundy
- Chablis
- Champagne, a sparkling wine named after the region of France where it is produced
- Chardonnay
- Gamay
- Hock, indirectly from Hochheim in Germany
- Madeira wine, a fortified wine and Plum in madeira, a dessert — Madeira islands of Portugal
- Marsala wine, a dry or sweet wine — Marsala, a town in western Sicily
- Port wine (or Porto), sweet fortified wine — Porto, in northern Portugal
- Rioja — La Rioja (region), Spain
- Sherry wine, an anglicisation of Jerez — Jerez de la Frontera, a city in southern Spain
- Tokaji, white wine — a city in Hungary

== Corporations ==
There are some corporations whose name is simply the same as their original location.

- Évian
- Iittala
- Nokia
- Raisio
- Tikkurila
- Vaasa
- Vauxhall

== Elements ==
See: Chemical elements named after places

== Musical genres ==
- Britpop — British popular music
- Canterbury scene — after Canterbury, Kent, England
- Chicago soul — after Chicago
- Dixieland jazz — after Dixie, nickname for the southern United States
- Dunedin sound — after the New Zealand city of Dunedin
- Madchester — after Manchester, England
- Memphis soul — after Memphis, Tennessee
- Northern soul — after Northern England
- Merseybeat — after the River Mersey
- Philly soul — after Philadelphia, Pennsylvania
- Urban Pasifika — after the Pacific Ocean
- Goa trance – after Goa

== Derivations from literary or mythical places ==
- Brobdingnagian, meaning very large in size — Brobdingnag, fictional land in the book Gulliver's Travels
- Cloud cuckoo land, an unrealistically idealistic state where everything is perfect, from The Birds by Aristophanes
- Eden, any paradisaical area, named after the religious Garden of Eden
- El Dorado, any area of great wealth, after the mythical city of gold
- hell, any horrible place, after the religious Hell
- Lilliputian, meaning very small in size — Lilliput, fictional island in the book Gulliver's Travels
- Munchkin, small children, dwarfs, or anything of diminutive stature — from the Munchkin country in The Wonderful Wizard of Oz
- Never Never Land, a metaphor for eternal childhood, immortality, and escapism, from J. M. Barries's Peter Pan
- Shangri-La, a mythical utopia, a language usage — Shangri-La, fictional place in the novel Lost Horizon
- utopia, term for organized society — Utopia, fictional republic from the book of the same name

== See also ==
- Lists of etymologies
- List of eponyms, names derived from people's names
- Demonym
- Lists of things named after places (chemical elements, chess openings, foods, drinks, mathematical problems, minor planets, other places, etc.)
