= Havana (disambiguation) =

Havana (Spanish: La Habana) is the capital and largest city of Cuba.

Havana, Havanna, or Havannah may also refer to:

== Geography ==
=== United States ===
- Havana, Alabama, an unincorporated community in Hale County
- Havana, Arkansas, northwest Yell County
- Havana, Illinois, Mason County
- Havana, Kansas, Montgomery County
- Havana, Minnesota, an unincorporated community in Steele County
- Havana, North Dakota, Sargent County
- Havana, Ohio, an unincorporated community in Huron County
- Havana, Tennessee, an unincorporated community in Hardin County, Tennessee
- Havana, Texas, a census-designated place in Hidalgo County
- Havana on the Hudson, a community in Northeastern New Jersey

=== Other places ===
- Havannah Island, Palm Island group, northern Queensland
- Havannah, Cheshire, England
- Port Havannah, a village and bay on Efate, Vanuatu

== Flora and fauna ==
- Havana (grape) or Avanà, a red Italian wine grape variety
- Havana (rabbit), from the Netherlands

== Music ==
=== Albums ===
- Havana (soundtrack), by Dave Grusin, 1990
- Havana (Tómas R. Einarsson album), 2003

=== Musicals ===
- Havana (Edwardian musical), 1908
- Havana, an unperformed musical by Frank Wildhorn

=== Songs ===
- "Havana" (Camila Cabello song), 2017
- "Havana" (Kenny G composition), 1997
- "Havana", by Echomen, 2001

== People ==
- Havana (given name), a list of people with the name

== Ships ==
- HMS Havannah (1811), a British Navy ship
- SS Havana (schooner), Canadian ship

== Sports and games ==
- Havana (board game), a light strategy game
- Havana (juggling), a club passing pattern for multiple people
- Havannah (board game), an abstract strategy board game

== Other uses ==
- Havana (film), 1990
- Havana (novel), by Stephen Hunter, 2003
- Havana (ritual), a Hindu fire ceremony
- Havanna (Argentine company), an Argentine food products company

== See also ==
- Habana (disambiguation)
- Habano (disambiguation)
- Habanero (disambiguation)
- Habanera (disambiguation)
- Havan (TV series), an Indian TV series
- "Hafanana", a 1976 song by Afric Simone
