= List of adjectivals and demonyms for Cuba =

The following are the 15 provinces of Cuba, along with their demonym or adjective form. Per Spanish morphology, the collective plural is made by adding an -s to pluralize the masculine singular forms listed, as in Cuba: cubano [masculine singular], cubana [feminine singular], cubanos [masculine plural] and cubanas [feminine plural].

Province	Demonym
Pinar del Río	pinareño/a
Artemisa	artemiseño/a
La Habana	habanero/a
Mayabeque	mayabequense
Matanzas	matancero/a
Cienfuegos	cienfueguero/a
Villa Clara	villaclareño/a
Sancti Spíritus	espirituano/a, colloquial: yayabero/a
Ciego de Ávila	avileño/a
Camagüey	camagüeyano/a
Las Tunas	tunero/a
Granma	granmense
Holguín	holguinero/a
Santiago de Cuba	santiaguero/a
Guantánamo	guantanamero/a

The majority of these provinces are named after their capital city, with the exception of:

- Mayabeque (San José de las Lajas, lajero/a; this adjective also refers to Santa Isabel de las Lajas, also known simply as Lajas),
- Villa Clara (Santa Clara, santaclareño/a),
- Granma (Bayamo, bayamés/esa).

Other places in Cuba and their adjective forms or demonyms are Baracoa (baracoense), Moa (moense), Florida (floridano/a), Palma Soriano (palmero/a), Manzanillo (manzanillero/a), Trinidad (trinitario/a).

The demonym habanero/a for Cuba's capital, Havana, has several derived or related terms, including:

- habanero, a chili pepper.
- habano, a generic term for Cuban cigars,
- habanera, a style of Cuban popular dance music of the 19th century.
- "Habanera", an aria from Georges Bizet's 1875 opéra comique Carmen.
- Havanese, the national dog of Cuba.

See also

- Habanero (disambiguation)
- Habanera (disambiguation)
- Habano (disambiguation)

== See also ==
- Provinces of Cuba
- List of adjectival and demonymic forms of place names
- List of adjectivals and demonyms for subcontinental regions
- List of adjectival and demonymic forms for countries and nations
