= SS Havana =

SS Havana is the name of the following ships:

- SS Havana (1891), sank at anchor in 1906
- SS Havana (1899), renamed Panama in 1905 and Aleutian in 1926, wrecked 1929
- SS Havana (1906), commissioned as USS Comfort (AH-3) 1918–1921, scrapped in 1948

== See also ==
- Havana (disambiguation)
