= Thomas Arvid =

American painter

Thomas Arvid (born March 24, 1964) is a contemporary oil painter whose career revolves around painting photorealistic depictions of wine and the rituals surrounding its consumption.

== Early life ==
Thomas Arvid was born in Detroit, Michigan, where his aptitude for art led him to pursue a career in sign painting. In 1986, Arvid, who is self-taught, moved to Atlanta, Georgia, to discover alternatives to the industrial work his hometown provided. Upon realizing that he could pursue fine art as a career, he began painting full-time after an inspirational backpacking trip through Europe in 1991.

Arvid pursued a study of the color red by painting Campbell soup cans, Converse High-top tennis shoes, and eventually red wine. After beginning his study of red wine, Arvid discovered that his paintings were being purchased before they were finished and decided to follow an unexplored niche by pursuing wine as his subject matter.

== Work ==
Arvid’s painting style is photorealistic and has been described as being "big and bold, with enough selected detail and softness to create a sense of balance…this blend of elements is precisely what winemakers hope to bring to their top vintages". Arvid’s work premiered in a solo exhibit at the Marietta/Cobb Museum of Art in 2012.
