= List of mayors of Smyrna, Georgia =

Mayors of the city of Smyrna, Georgia, USA

The following is a list of mayors of the city of Smyrna, Georgia, United States.

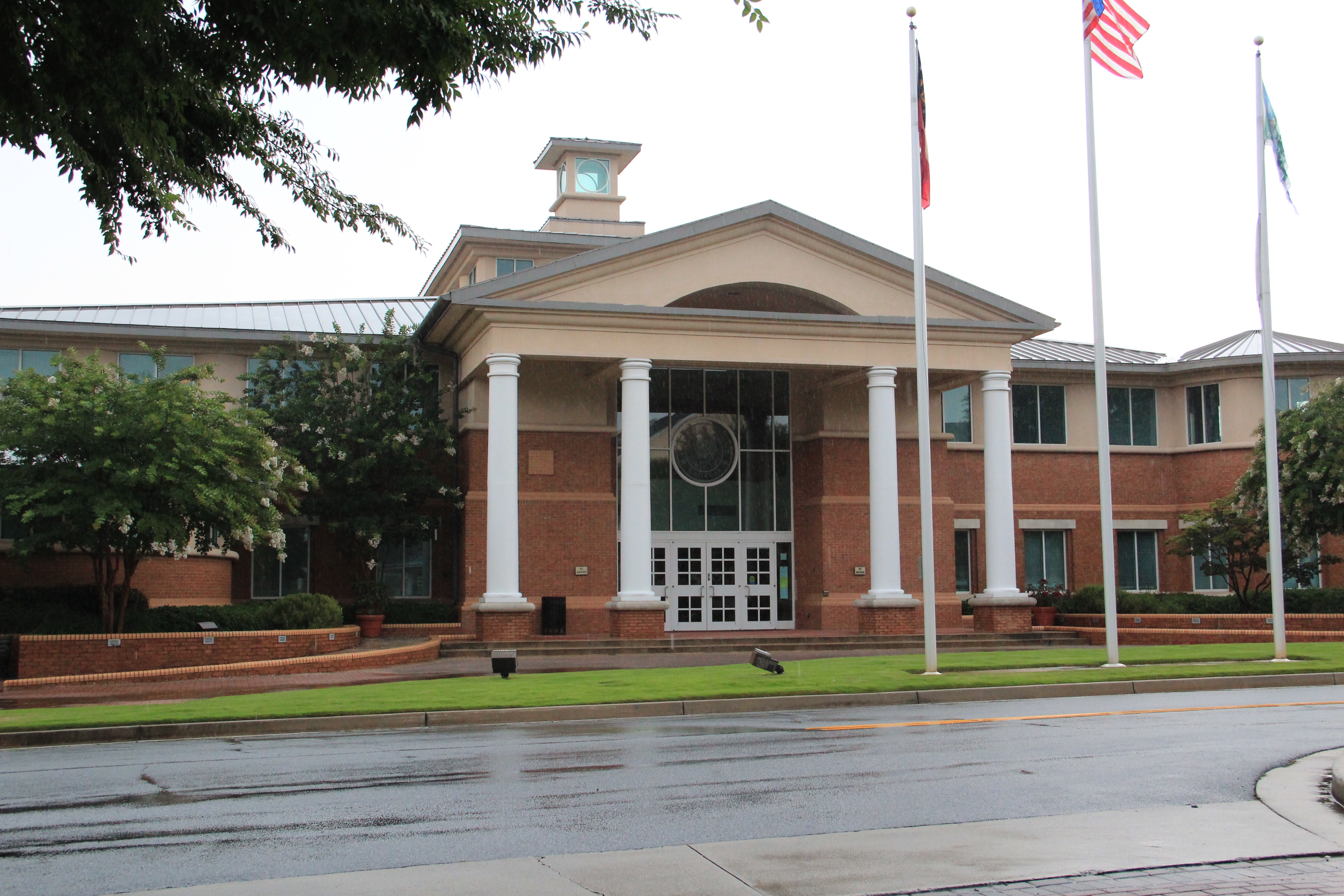
Smyrna City Hall building in 2013

- John C. Moore, 1872–1873
- Matthew Varner Ruff, 1900, 1921
- J.T. Pace, 1901–1906, 1908
- J.F. Petty, 1907
- Joe L. Stopplebein, 1909
- Jake C. Moore, 1910–1911
- W.T. Pace, 1912
- J.W. Lyle, ca.1912
- J.W. Fuller, 1913–1917
- B.F. Whitney, 1918–1920
- John L. Pollock, 1922–1924
- J. Gid Morris, 1925–1926
- P.M. Edwards, 1927–1930
- P.F. Brinkley, 1931–1932
- H.H. Arrington, 1933–1937
- T.W. Huffstutler, ca.1937
- J.Y. Wootten, ca.1945
- Lorena Pace Pruitt, 1945–1948
- John M. Gibson, ca.1950–1952, 1958–1959
- Guy Duncan, 1953–1955
- James E. Quarles, 1955–1957
- George W. Kreeger, 1960–1961, 1964–1969
- J.B. Ables, 1962–1963
- Harold Smith, 1970–1971
- John C. Porterfield, 1972–1975
- Arthur T. Bacon, 1976–1977, 1982–1985
- Frank Johnson, 1980–1981
- A. Max Bacon, 1985–2019
- Derek Norton, 2020–present

== See also ==
- Smyrna history
