= Demonym =

Name for a resident of a particular geographical area

A demonym (/ˈdɛmənɪm/), or rarely gentilic, is a word that identifies a group of people (inhabitants, residents, natives) in relation to a particular place. Demonyms are usually derived from the name of the place (hamlet, village, town, city, region, province, state, country, and continent). Demonyms are used to designate all people (the general population) of a particular place, regardless of ethnic, linguistic, religious or other cultural differences that may exist within the population of that place. Examples of demonyms include Cochabambino, for someone from the city of Cochabamba; Indian for a person from India; and Swahili, for a person of the Swahili coast.

Many demonyms function both endonymically and exonymically (used by the referents themselves or by outsiders); others function only in one of those ways.

As a sub-field of anthroponymy, the study of demonyms is called demonymy or demonymics.

Since they are referring to territorially defined groups of people, demonyms are semantically different from ethnonyms (names of ethnic groups). In the English language, there are many polysemic words that have several meanings (including demonymic and ethnonymic uses), and therefore a particular use of any such word depends on the context. For example, the word Thai may be used as a demonym, designating any inhabitant of Thailand, while the same word may also be used as an ethnonym, designating members of the Thai people. Conversely, some groups of people may be associated with multiple demonyms. For example, a native of the United Kingdom may be called a British person, a Briton or, informally, a Brit.

Some demonyms may have several meanings. For example, the demonym Macedonians may refer to the population of North Macedonia, or more generally to the entire population of the region of Macedonia, or to the Greek people of the Greek region of Macedonia. In some languages, a demonym may be borrowed from another language as a nickname or descriptive adjective for a group of people: for example, Québécois (masculine) and Québécoise (feminine) are commonly used in English for a native of the province or city of Quebec (though Quebecer and Quebecker are also available).

In English, demonyms are always capitalized.

Often, demonyms are the same as the adjectival form of the place, e.g. Egyptian, Japanese, or Greek. However, they are not necessarily the same, as exemplified by the adjective Spanish instead of the noun Spaniard or British instead of Briton.

English commonly uses national demonyms such as Brazilian or Algerian, while the usage of local demonyms such as Chicagoan, Okie or Parisian is less common. Many local demonyms are rarely used and many places, especially smaller towns and cities, lack a commonly used and accepted demonym altogether.

== Etymology ==
Demonym comes from Ancient Greek δῆμος (dêmos) 'people, tribe' and ὄνυμα (ónuma) 'name'); and gentilic from Latin gentilis 'of a clan, or gens'.

National Geographic attributes the term demonym to Merriam-Webster editor Paul Dickson in a work from 1990. The word did not appear for nouns, adjectives, and verbs derived from geographical names in the Merriam-Webster Collegiate Dictionary nor in prominent style manuals such as the Chicago Manual of Style. It was subsequently popularized in this sense in 1997 by Dickson in his book Labels for Locals. However, in What Do You Call a Person From...? A Dictionary of Resident Names (the first edition of Labels for Locals) Dickson attributed the term to George H. Scheetz, in his Names' Names: A Descriptive and Prescriptive Onymicon (1988), which is apparently where the term first appears. The term may have been fashioned after demonymic, which the Oxford English Dictionary defines, as the name of an Athenian citizen according to the deme to which the citizen belongs, with its first use traced to 1893.

== Suffixation ==
Several linguistic elements are used to create demonyms in the English language. The most common is to add a suffix to the end of the location name, slightly modified in some instances. These may resemble Late Latin, Semitic, Celtic, or Germanic suffixes, such as -(a)n, -ian, -anian, -nian, -in(e), -a(ñ/n)o/a, -e(ñ/n)o/a, -i(ñ/n)o/a, -ite, -(e)r, -(i)sh, -ene, -ensian, -ard, -ese, -nese, -lese, -i(e), -i(ya), -iot, -iote, -k, -asque, -(we)gian, -onian, -vian, -ois(e), or -ais(e).

Examples of various suffixes

-(a)n

Continents and regions

- Africa → Africans
- Antarctica → Antarcticans
- Asia → Asians
- Australia → Australians
- Europe → Europeans
- North America → North Americans
- South America → South Americans
- Central America → Central Americans
- Americas → Americans
- Oceania → Oceanians

Countries

- Afghanistan → Afghans
- Albania → Albanians
- Algeria → Algerians
- Andorra → Andorrans
- Angola → Angolans
- Antigua → Antiguans
- Armenia → Armenians
- Australia → Australians
- Austria → Austrians
- Barbuda → Barbudans
- Belize → Belizeans
- Bolivia → Bolivians
- Bosnia and Herzegovina → Bosnians and Herzegovinians (mostly referred to as Bosnians)
- Brunei → Bruneians
- Bulgaria → Bulgarians
- Burundi → Burundians
- Cambodia → Cambodians
- Chile → Chileans
- Colombia → Colombians
- Costa Rica → Costa Ricans
- Croatia → Croatians (also "Croats")
- Cuba → Cubans
- Czech Republic → Czechs
- Dominican Republic → Dominicans
- El Salvador → Salvadorans
- Eritrea → Eritreans
- Estonia → Estonians
- Ethiopia → Ethiopians
- Fiji → Fijian, Fijindians
- Gambia → Gambians
- Georgia → Georgians
- Germany → Germans
- Guatemala → Guatemalans
- Guinea → Guineans
- Haiti → Haitians
- Honduras → Hondurans
- Hungary → Hungarians
- India → Indians
- Indonesia → Indonesians
- Jamaica → Jamaicans
- Kenya → Kenyans
- Kiribati → Kiribatians (also "I-Kiribati")
- Kosovo → Kosovars (also "Kosovans")
- Latvia → Latvians
- Liberia → Liberians
- Libya → Libyans
- Lithuania → Lithuanians
- Malawi → Malawians
- Malaysia → Malaysians
- Mali → Malians
- Mauritania → Mauritanians
- Mexico → Mexicans
- Micronesia → Micronesians
- Moldova → Moldovans
- Mongolia → Mongolians (also "Mongols")
- Monaco → Monacans (also "Monegasque")
- Morocco → Moroccans
- Mozambique → Mozambicans
- Namibia → Namibians
- Nauru → Nauruans
- Nicaragua → Nicaraguans
- Nigeria → Nigerians
- Niue → Niueans
- North Korea → North Koreans
- North Macedonia → Macedonians
- Palau → Palauans
- Papua New Guinea → Papua New Guineans
- Paraguay → Paraguayans
- Persia → Persians
- Romania → Romanians
- Russia → Russians
- Rwanda → Rwandans (also "Rwandese")
- Saint Lucia → Saint Lucians
- Samoa → Samoans
- Saudi Arabia → Saudis (also Saudi Arabians)
- Serbia → Serbians (also Serbs)
- Sierra Leone → Sierra Leoneans
- Singapore → Singaporeans
- Slovakia → Slovaks (also Slovakians)
- Slovenia → Slovenes (also Slovenians)
- South Africa → South Africans
- South Korea → South Koreans
- Sri Lanka → Sri Lankans
- St. Kitts and Nevis → Kittitians, Nevisians
- Syria → Syrians
- Tanzania → Tanzanians
- Tonga → Tongans
- Tunisia → Tunisians
- Tuvalu → Tuvaluans
- Uganda → Ugandans
- Uruguay → Uruguayans
- United States → Americans
- Vanuatu → Vanuatuans (also "Ni-Vanuatu")
- Venezuela → Venezuelans
- Zambia → Zambians
- Zimbabwe → Zimbabweans

Constituent states, provinces and regions

- Abkhazia → Abkhazians (also "Abkhaz")
- Emirate of Abu Dhabi → Abu Dhabians (also "Dhabyani")
- Alaska → Alaskans
- Alberta → Albertans
- Algarve → Algarvians
- Andalusia → Andalusians
- Arizona → Arizonans
- Arkansas → Arkansans
- Aruba → Arubans
- Asturias → Asturians
- Azores → Azoreans
- Bago Region → Bagoans
- Bangka Island → Bangkans
- Bavaria → Bavarians
- Bohemia → Bohemians
- Bonaire → Bonaireans
- Borneo → Borneans
- Bougainville → Bougainvilleans
- British Columbia → British Columbians
- Brittany → Bretons
- Cabinda → Cabindans
- California → Californians
- Carinthia → Carinthians
- Colorado → Coloradans
- Corsica → Corsicans
- Crete → Cretans
- Crimea → Crimeans
- Cumbria → Cumbrians
- Curaçao → Curaçaoans
- Dalmatia → Dalmatians
- Delaware → Delawareans
- Washington, D.C. → Washingtonians
- Extremadura → Extremadurans
- Florida → Floridans (more commonly "Floridians" below)
- Galatia → Galatians
- Galicia → Galicians
- Galilee → Galileans
- Gaza Strip → Gazans
- Georgia → Georgians
- Hawaiʻi → Hawaiians (Note: Local usage generally reserves Hawaiian as an ethnonym referring to Native Hawaiians. Hawaii resident is the preferred local form to refer to state residents in general regardless of ethnicity.)
- Hebrides → Hebrideans
- Idaho → Idahoans
- Illinois → Illinoisans
- Indiana → Hoosiers
- Ingria → Ingrians
- Inner Mongolia → Inner Mongolians
- Iowa → Iowans
- Istria → Istrians
- Jakarta → Jakartans
- Java → Javans (also "Javanese")
- Johor → Johoreans
- Judea → Judeans
- Kansas → Kansans
- Karelia → Karelians
- Karnataka → Kannadigas
- Kayah State → Kayahans
- Kedah → Kedahans
- Kentucky → Kentuckians
- Khyber Pakhtunkhwa → Pathans
- Kosrae → Kosraeans
- Lagos → Lagosians
- Liguria → Ligurians
- Louisiana → Louisianans (also "Louisianians")
- Madeira → Madeirans
- Malacca → Malaccans
- Mallorca → Mallorcans
- Mandalay Region → Mandalayans
- Manitoba → Manitobans
- Masuria → Masurians
- Menorca → Menorcans
- Minnesota → Minnesotans
- Mississippi → Mississippians
- Missouri → Missourians
- Moluccas → Moluccans
- Montana → Montanans
- Moravia → Moravians
- Nebraska → Nebraskans
- Nevada → Nevadans
- New Jersey → New Jerseyans
- New Mexico → New Mexicans (also "Neomexicanos", "Neomejicanos")
- Normandy → Normans
- North Dakota → North Dakotans
- Northwest Territories → Northwest Territorians
- Nova Scotia → Nova Scotians
- Ohio → Ohioans
- Okinawa → Okinawans
- Oklahoma → Oklahomans
- Ontario → Ontarians
- Oregon → Oregonians
- Otago → Otagoans
- Papua → Papuans
- Patagonia → Patagonians
- Pennsylvania → Pennsylvanians
- Pohnpei → Pohnpeians
- Pomerania → Pomeranians
- Puerto Rico → Puerto Ricans
- Samogitia → Samogitians
- Sabah → Sabahans
- Sarawak → Sarawakians
- Sardinia → Sardinians (also "Sards")
- Saskatchewan → Saskatchewanians (also "Saskatchewanite")
- Saxony → Saxons
- Siberia → Siberians
- Silesia → Silesians
- Slavonia → Slavonians
- South Australia → South Australians
- South Dakota → South Dakotans
- Styria → Styrians
- Sumatra → Sumatrans
- Sumba → Sumbans
- Sumbawa → Sumbawans
- Syrmia → Syrmians
- Tahiti → Tahitians
- Tamil Nadu → Tamilian
- Taranaki → Taranakians
- Tasmania → Tasmanians (informally "Taswegians")
- Tennessee → Tennesseans
- Texas → Texans
- Thuringia → Thuringians
- Tibet → Tibetans
- Tokelau → Tokelauans
- Transnistria → Transnistrians
- Transylvania → Transylvanians
- Umbria → Umbrians
- Utah → Utahns (also "Utahans")
- Victoria → Victorians
- Virginia → Virginians
- Vojvodina → Vojvodinans
- Waikato → Waikatorians
- Wake Island → Wakeans
- Wallachia → Wallachians
- Western Australia → Western Australians, West Australians (informally Sandgropers, never Westralians)
- West Papua → West Papuans
- West Virginia → West Virginians
- Westphalia → Westphalians

Cities

- Aberdeen → Aberdonians
- Abu Dhabi → Abu Dhabians (also "Dhabyani")
- Adelaide → Adelaideans
- Alexandria → Alexandrians
- Albuquerque → Albuquerqueans (also "Burqueños" or the feminine "Burqueñas")
- Annapolis → Annapolitans
- Atlanta → Atlantans
- Baltimore → Baltimoreans
- Bath → Bathonians
- Bristol → Bristolians
- Brockton → Brocktonians
- Bogotá → Bogotans
- Canberra → Canberrans
- Charlotte → Charlotteans
- Chattanooga → Chattanoogans
- Chicago → Chicagoans
- Cincinnati → Cincinnatians
- Clitheroe → Clitheronians
- Coimbatore → Coimbatoreians
- Coventry → Coventrians
- Danu → Danuans
- Derby → Derbeians
- Dubai → Dubaians
- Dundee → Dundonians
- El Paso → El Pasoans, El Paseños
- Galway → Galwegians
- Glasgow → Glaswegians
- Hanoi → Hanoians
- Hatta → Hattans (also "Hattawi")
- Hobart → Hobartians
- Indianapolis → Indianapolitans
- İzmir → İzmirians
- Jakarta → Jakartans
- Kalamazoo → Kalamazooans
- Kandy → Kandyans
- Kuching → Kuchingites
- Kyiv → Kyivans
- Kolkata → Calcuttans
- Lagos → Lagosians
- Las Vegas → Las Vegans
- Liverpool → Liverpudlians
- Madera → Maderans
- Malang → Malangans
- Manchester → Mancunians
- Manila → Manilans (also "Manileños" or the feminine "Manileñas")
- Mecca → Meccans
- Medina → Medinans
- Melbourne → Melburnians
- Miami → Miamians
- Milwaukee → Milwaukeeans
- Minneapolis → Minneapolitans
- Mira Mesa, San Diego → Mira Mesans
- Miri → Mirians
- Naypyidaw → Naypyidawans
- Ngawi city → Ngawians
- Oklahoma City → Oklahoma Cityans
- Omaha → Omahans
- Ottawa → Ottawans
- Philadelphia → Philadelphians
- Pisa → Pisans
- Pueblo → Puebloans
- Regina → Reginans
- Riga → Rigans
- Rome → Romans
- Sacramento → Sacramentans
- Salem → Salemians
- San Antonio → San Antonians
- San Diego → San Diegans
- San Francisco → San Franciscans
- San Jose → San Joseans
- Sarasota → Sarasotans
- Sioux City → Sioux Cityans
- Springville → Springvillians
- Sofia → Sofians
- St. Louis → St. Louisans
- Surabaya → Surabayans
- Tauranga → Taurangans
- Thebes → Thebans
- Toledo, Ohio → Toledoans
- Tucson → Tucsonians, Tucsonans
- Tulsa → Tulsans
- Utica → Uticans
- Valencia → Valencians
- Vilnius → Vilnians
- Waco → Wacoans
- Yuma → Yumians

-ian

Countries

- Artsakh → Artsakhians
- Azerbaijan → Azerbaijanians (also "Azerbaijanis" and "Azeris")
- Bahamas → Bahamians
- Barbados → Barbadians (also "Bajans")
- Belarus → Belarusians
- Belgium → Belgians
- Brazil → Brazilians
- Cameroon → Cameroonians
- Canada → Canadians
- Cayman Islands → Caymanians
- Chad → Chadians
- Comoros → Comorians
- Ecuador → Ecuadorians
- Egypt → Egyptians
- Ghana → Ghanaians
- Gibraltar → Gibraltarians
- Grenada → Grenadians
- Iran → Iranians
- Italy → Italians
- Jordan → Jordanians
- Laos → Laotians
- Maldives → Maldivians
- Palestine → Palestinians
- Peru → Peruvians
- Saint Vincent → Vincentians
- Trinidad and Tobago → Trinidadians, Tobagonians (also "Trinbagonians")
- Ukraine → Ukrainians

Constituent states, provinces, regions and cities

- Aarhus → Aarhusians
- Adelaide → Adelaidians
- Alabama → Alabamians
- Athens → Athenians
- Ayeyarwady Region → Ayeyarwadians
- Banat → Banatians
- Ballarat → Ballaratians
- Bareilly → Bareillian
- Bengaluru → Bangloreans, Bengalurigaru
- Banten → Bantenians (also "Banteneses", "Banteners")
- Belgrade → Belgradians (also "Belgraders")
- Bermuda → Bermudians (also "Bermudans")
- Birmingham, Alabama → Birminghamians
- Blackburn → Blackburnians
- Blackpool → Blackpudlians
- Bangkok → Bangkokians
- Bogor → Bogorians
- Boston → Bostonians
- Bracknell → Bracknellians
- Bradford → Bradfordians
- Brighton → Brightonians
- Brisbane → Brisbanians (also "Brisbanites")
- Bristol → Bristolians
- Bukovina → Bukovinian
- Burgundy → Burgundians
- Calgary → Calgarians
- Canary Islands → Canarians
- Canterbury, New Zealand → Cantabrians
- Cape Town - Capetonians
- Castile → Castilians
- Catalonia → Catalonians (also ""Catalan"")
- Cedar Rapids → Cedar Rapidians
- Chelmsford → Chelmsfordians
- Chester → Cestrians
- Chin State → Chinians
- Chittagong → Chittagonians (also "Chatgaiya")
- Christchurch → Christchurchians (also "Christchurchers")
- Cirebon → Cirebonians
- Corinth → Corinthians
- Coventry → Coventrians
- Darwin → Darwinians
- Dayton → Daytonians
- Devon → Devonians
- Duluth → Duluthians
- Edmonton → Edmontonians
- Florida → Floridians
- Fort Worth → Fort Worthians
- Fredericton → Frederictonians
- Greenville → Greenvillians
- Hamilton → Hamiltonians
- Harrow → Harrovians
- Hartlepool → Hartlepudlians
- Hereford → Herefordians
- Herzegovina → Herzegovinians
- Hesse → Hessians
- Hobart → Hobartians
- Houston → Houstonians
- Isles of Scilly → Scillonians
- Iowa City → Iowa Citians
- Jessup → Jessupians
- Kachin State → Kachinians
- Kansas City → Kansas Citians
- Kentucky → Kentuckians
- Kingston → Kingstonians
- Labrador → Labradorians
- Laguna → Lagunians (also "Laguneño", "Lagunense")
- Lancashire → Lancastrians
- Lancaster → Lancastrians
- Lesbos → Lesbians
- Lethbridge → Lethbridgians
- Lexington → Lexingtonians
- Liverpool → Liverpudlians (also, informally, "Scousers")
- Louisiana → Louisianians (also "Louisianans")
- Louisville → Louisvillians
- Madison → Madisonians
- Madrid → Madrilenians
- Maharashtra → Maharashtrians (also "Marathis")
- Market Drayton → Draytonians (also, informally "Gingerbread Men")
- McKinney → McKinnians
- Melbourne → Melburnians
- Memphis → Memphians
- Michigan → Michiganians (also Michiganders)
- Mobile, Alabama → Mobilian
- Nelson → Nelsonians
- New Guinea → New Guinians
- New Orleans → New Orleanians
- North Carolina → North Carolinians
- Northern Territory → Territorians
- Oregon → Oregonians
- Paris → Parisians
- Perlis → Perlisians
- Perak → Perakians
- Peterborough → Peterborians
- Phoenix → Phoenicians
- Plymouth → Plymothians
- Port Harcourt → Harcourtians
- Podgorica → Podgoricians
- Preston, Lancashire →Prestonians
- Prince George's County → Prince Georgians
- Quezon (Tayabas) → Quezonians (also "Quezonin", "Tayabasin", with the Tayabas Tagalog suffix -(h)in)
- Rivers State → Riverians
- Rochdale → Rochdalians
- Rochester, New York → Rochesterians
- Rockwall, Texas → Rockwallians
- Rockwall County, Texas → Rockwallians
- Saint Petersburg → Saint Petersburgians (also "Saint Petersburgers")
- Sarawak → Sarawakians
- Saskatchewan → Saskatchewanians
- Saskatoon → Saskatonians
- Savannah → Savannahians
- Shropshire & Shrewsbury → Salopians
- Sicily → Sicilians
- Solihull → Silhillians
- South Carolina → South Carolinians
- Stockport → Stopfordians
- Swindon → Swindonians
- Tanintharyi Region → Tanintharians
- Tel Aviv, Israel → Tel Avivians
- Telford → Telfordians
- Thrace → Thracians
- Towcester → Towcestrians
- Truro → Truronians
- Tuban, East Java → Tubanians
- Tucson → Tucsonians
- Vilnius → Vilnians
- Washington → Washingtonians
- Wellington → Wellingtonians
- Wilmington → Wilmingtonians
- Yukon → Yukonians

-anian

- Guam → Guamanians
- Mawlamyine → Mawlamanians

-nian

- Bendigo → Bendigonians
- Buffalo → Buffalonians
- Cork → Corkonians
- Manchester → Mancunians
- Naga → Naganians
- Panama → Panamanians
- Sligo → Sligonians
- Tampa → Tampanians
- Tobago → Tobagonians
- Toronto → Torontonians
- Torquay → Torquinians
- Trinidad and Tobago → Trinbagonians
- Truro → Truronians
- Wa → Wanians

-in(e)

- Argentina → Argentines (also "Argentinians")
- Byzantium → Byzantines
- Florence → Florentines (also Latin "Florentia")
- Gilbert Islands → Gilbertines (as by Robert Louis Stevenson, but Gilbertese was more usual)
- The Levant → Levantines
- Montenegro → Montenegrins
- Palatinate → Palatines
- Philippines → Philippine, Filipino (feminine: "Filipina", see below)
- Philistia → Philistines
- Trieste → Triestines

-(h)in

The Tayabas Tagalog suffix -(h)in, which is mostly used by the natives in the province of Quezon, is also used for their local or native demonyms in English.

- Quezon (Tayabas) → Quezonins, Tayabasins (also "Quezonians")
- Lucena → Lucenahins
- Tayabas → Tayabasins (also "Tayabense")
- Lucban → Lucbanins
- Infanta → Infantahins
- Sariaya → Sariayahins
- Brgy. Ilayang/Ibabang Talim → Talimin
- Brgy. Isabang → Isabangin (both in Lucena and Tayabas)
- Brgy. Morong → Morongin

-a(ñ/n)o/a, -e(ñ/n)o/a, or -i(ñ/n)o/a

Adaptations from the standard Spanish suffix -e(ñ/n)o (sometimes using a final -a instead of -o for a female, following the standard Spanish suffix -e(ñ/n)a)

Countries and regions

- Bicol → Bicolanos
- Cebu → Cebuanos
- El Salvador → Salvadoreños (also "Salvadorans")
- New Mexico → Neomexicanos, Neomejicanos (also "New Mexicans")
- Philippines → Filipinos

Cities

- Albuquerque → Burqueños or the feminine Burqueñas (also "Albuquerqueans")
- Belo Horizonte → Belo-horizontinos
- Buenos Aires → Porteños (when referring to the Autonomous City of Buenos Aires) or "Bonaerense" (if referring to the Province of Buenos Aires)
- Caguas - Caguenos
- Cainta → Cainteños
- Cavite → Caviteños
- Daraga → Daragueños
- Davao City → Davaoeños
- Iriga → Irigueños
- Legazpi → Legazpeños
- Ligao → Ligaoeños
- Los Angeles → Angelenos
- Madrid → Madrileños
- Manila → Manileños (also "Manilans")
- Masbate → Masbateños
- Naga → Nagueños
- San Pablo → San Pableños
- São Paulo → Paulistanos
- Tabaco → Tabaqueños
- Tauranga → Taurangans
- Zamboanga City → Zamboangueños

-ite

- Akron → Akronites
- Andhra - Andhrites
- Ann Arbor → Ann Arborites
- Austin → Austinites
- Bagansiapiapi → Bagansiapiapites
- Baku → Bakuvites
- Bandung → Bandungites
- Bergen County, New Jersey → Bergenites
- Boulder → Boulderites
- Brisbane → Brisbanites (also "Brisbanian")
- Bronx → Bronxites
- Brooklyn → Brooklynites
- Carson City, Nevada → Carsonites
- Chennai → Chennaiites
- Columbus → Columbusite
- Dallas → Dallasites
- Decatur → Decaturites
- Delhi → Delhites
- Denton, Texas → Dentonites
- Denver → Denverites
- Dhaka → Dhakaites (also "Dhakaiya")
- Dunedin → Dunedinites
- Durban → Durbanites
- Erie, Pennsylvania → Erieites
- Gaya → Gayaites
- Guelph → Guelphites
- Irmo, South Carolina → Irmites
- Israel → Israelis (also "Israelites")
- Istanbul → Istanbulites
- Jerusalem → Jerusalemites
- Karachi → Karachiites
- Kerala → Keralites
- Kimberley → Kimberlites
- Kweyol → Kweyolites
- Labuan Bajo → Labuan Bajoites
- Leicester → Leicesterite
- Manhattan → Manhattanites
- Mon State → Monites
- Moscow → Muscovites (also Latin "Muscovia")
- Montpelier, Vermont → Montpelierites
- Mumbai → Mumbaiites, Mumbaikars
- New Hampshire → New Hampshirites
- Norman, Oklahoma → Normanites
- Oban → Obanites
- Odesa → Odesites
- Pahang → Pahangite (also "Pahangese")
- Patna → Patnaites
- Penang → Penangite
- Perth → Perthites (also "Perthian" and "Perthling")
- Pullman → Pullmanites
- Putney → Putneyites
- Queens → Queensites
- Reading → Readingites
- Reno, Nevada → Renoites
- Ruskin, Florida → Ruskinites
- Saint Paul, Minnesota → Saint Paulites
- Salem → Salemites
- Seattle → Seattleites
- Seoul → Seoulites
- Shiloh → Shilonites (as in: "Ahijah the Shilonite")
- Shillong → Shillongite (also "Nong Shillong" and "Nong Sor")
- Smyrna, Georgia → Smynite
- Spokane → Spokanites
- Sydney → Sydneyites (also "Sydneysider")
- Telangana→ Telanganites
- Tokyo → Tokyoites
- Vancouver → Vancouverites
- Vizag → Vizagites
- Warangal → Warangalites
- Wenham, Massachusetts → Wenhamites
- Westchester County, New York → Westchesterites
- Whittier, California → Whittierites
- Winston-Salem → Winston-Salemites
- Wisconsin → Wisconsinites
- Wrexham → Wrexhamites
- Wyoming → Wyomingites
- Yangon → Yangonites

-(e)r

- Amsterdam → Amsterdammers
- Anaheim → Anaheimer
- Auckland → Aucklanders
- Bakersfield → Bakersfielder
- Beijing → Beijingers
- Belgrade → Belgraders
- Bergen → Bergeners
- Berlin → Berliners
- Bucharest → Bucharesters
- Budapest → Budapesters
- Boone, North Carolina → Booner
- Brussels → Brusselers
- Chatham Islands → Chatham Islanders
- Christmas Island → Christmas Islanders
- Cleveland → Clevelanders
- Cocos (Keeling) Islands → Cocos Islanders
- Connecticut → Connecticuter
- Cook Islands → Cook Islanders
- Copenhagen → Copenhageners
- Detroit → Detroiters
- Dublin → Dubliners
- Dresden → Dresdeners
- Easter Island → Easter Islanders (also "Rapa Nui")
- Falkland Islands → Falkland Islanders
- Fife → Fifers
- Frankfurt → Frankfurters
- Greenland → Greenlanders (also "Greenlandic")
- Hamburg → Hamburgers
- Hannover → Hannoveraners
- Heligoland → Heligolanders (also "Heligolandic")
- Holland → Hollanders
- Hong Kong → Hongkonger, Hong Kongers (also "Hong Kongese", "Hongkongese")
- Iceland → Icelanders (also "Icelandic")
- Kosovo^{[a]} → Kosovars (also "Kosovan")
- Leeds → Loiners
- Leipzig → Leipzigers
- Liechtenstein → Liechtensteiners
- Little Rock → Little Rockers
- London → Londoners
- Lorraine → Lorrainers
- Luxembourg → Luxembourgers
- Maine → Mainers
- Maryland → Marylanders
- Michigan → Michiganders
- Montreal → Montrealers
- Netherlands → Netherlanders (also "Dutchman" and "Hollanders")
- New Brunswick → New Brunswickers
- New England → New Englanders
- New York → New Yorkers
- New York City → New Yorkers
- New Zealand → New Zealanders (see below; non-standard examples)
- Newfoundland → Newfoundlanders
- Norfolk Island → Norfolk Islanders
- Oakland → Oaklanders
- Pangkal Pinang → Pangkalpinangers
- Pitcairn Islands → Pitcairn Islanders
- Pittsburgh → Pittsburghers (informally "Yinzers")
- Prague → Praguers
- Prince Edward Island → Prince Edward Islanders
- Puntland → Puntlanders
- Quebec → Quebeckers, Quebecers (also "Quebecois(e)")
- Queensland → Queenslanders
- Rhineland → Rhinelanders
- Rhode Island → Rhode Islanders
- Rotterdam → Rotterdammers
- Saarland → Saarlanders
- Sint Maarten → Sint Maarteners
- Solomon Islands → Solomon Islanders
- Somaliland → Somalilanders
- Stockholm → Stockholmers
- Stuttgart → Stuttgarters
- Tallinn → Tallinners
- Torres Strait Islands → Torres Strait Islanders
- Vermont → Vermonters
- Winnipeg → Winnipeggers
- Yellowknife → Yellowknifers
- York (UK) → Yorkers (also "Yorkies")
- Yukon → Yukoners
- Zürich → Zürchers

Often used for European locations and Canadian locations

-(i)sh

(Usually suffixed to a truncated form of the toponym, or place-name.)

"-ish" is usually proper only as an adjective. See note below list.

- Åland → Ålandish people (demonym "Ålandic")
- Bangka Island → Bangkish
- Britain, Great Britain and United Kingdom → British people (demonym "Britons")
- Cornwall → Cornish people (demonym "Cornishmen", "Cornishwomen")
- Denmark → Danish people (demonym "Danes")
- England → English people (demonym "Englishmen", "Englishwomen")
- Finland → Finnish people (demonym "Finns", "Finnic")
- Flanders → Flemish people (demonym "Flemings")
- Ireland → Irish people (demonym "Irishmen", "Irishwomen")
- Kent → Kentish people
- Kurdistan → Kurdish people (demonym "Kurds")
- Lombok → Lombokish people
- Luxembourg → Luxembourgish people (demonym "Luxembourgers")
- New South Wales → New South Welshmen
- Niger → Nigerish (also "Nigerien")
- Northern Ireland → Northern Irish people
- Poland → Polish people (demonym "Poles")
- Scotland → Scottish people (demonym "Scots", "Scotsmen", "Scotswomen")
- Spain → Spanish people (demonym "Spaniards")
- Sweden → Swedish people (demonym "Swedes")
- Turkey → Turkish people (demonym "Turks")
- Wales → Welsh people (demonym "Welshmen", "Welshwomen", "Walian")

-ene

- Cairo → Cairenes
- Cyrenaica → Cyrenes
- Damascus → Damascenes
- Nazareth → Nazarenes
- Palmyra → Palmyrenes
- Slovenia → Slovenes (also "Slovenians")

Often used for Middle Eastern locations and European locations.

-ensian (These are largely obsolete.)

- Kingston-upon-Hull (UK) → Hullensians
- Leeds (UK) → Leodensians
- Reading (UK) → Readingensians

-ard

- Spain → Spaniards (also "Spanish")
- Savoy → Savoyards
- Montagne → Montagnards

-ese, -nese or -lese

- Abruzzo → Abruzzese
- Ajman → Ajmanese
- Aragon → Aragonese
- Aceh → Acehnese
- Assam → Assamese
- Bali → Balinese
- Bengal → Bengalese
- Benin → Beninese (also "Beninois")
- Bergen → Bergenese
- Bern → Bernese
- Bearn → Bearnese
- Bhutan → Bhutanese
- Bologna → Bolognese
- Burkina Faso → Burkinabe
- Calabria → Calabrese
- Cirebon, West Java → Cirebonese
- China → Chinese
- Chuuk → Chuukese
- Congo → Congolese
- Da Lat → Dalatese
- East Timor → East Timorese
- Faroe Islands → Faroese
- Emirate of Fujairah → Fujairahnese
- Gabon → Gabonese (also "Gabonais", "Gabonaise")
- Genoa → Genovese, Genoese
- Gilbert Islands → Gilbertese (also "Gilbertine")
- Grenadines → Grenadinese
- Guangdong (Canton) → Cantonese people
- Guyana → Guyanese
- Hainan → Hainanese
- Hong Kong → Hongkongese
- Hunan → Hunanese
- Japan → Japanese (also "Nipponese")
- Java → Javanese (also "Javans")
- Kawthaung → Kawthaunggese
- Kelantan → Kelantanese
- Kokang → Kokanggese
- Lebanon → Lebanese
- Leon → Leonese
- London → Londonese
- Macao → Macanese
- Malta → Maltese
- Manila → Manilese
- Marshall Islands → Marshallese
- Milan → Milanese
- Myanmar/Burma → Burmese
- Nanjing (Nanking/Nankin)→ Nankinese
- Navarre → Navarrese
- Negeri Sembilan → Negeri Sembilanese
- Nepal → Nepalese (also "Nepalis")
- Pahang → Pahangese (also "Pahangite")
- Pa Laung → Palaunggese
- Pa'O → Paonese
- Piedmont → Piedmontese
- Pittsburgh → Pittsburghese (as used routinely by residents of Pittsburgh referring only to the accent/dialect)
- Portugal → Portuguese
- Rakhine State → Arakanese
- Ras Al Khaimah → Khaimahnese
- Rwanda → Rwandese (also "Rwandans")
- Saba → Sabanese
- Sagaing Region → Sagainggese
- Saigon → Saigonese
- San Marino → Sammarinese
- Sark → Sarkese
- Sassari → Sassarese
- Senegal → Senegalese
- Shan State → Shanese
- Shanghai → Shanghainese
- Emirate of Sharjah → Sharjahnese (also "Sharjawi")
- Siam → Siamese
- Sikkim → Sikkimese
- (South) Sudan → (South) Sudanese
- Suriname → Surinamese
- Swindon → Swindonese
- Taiwan → Taiwanese
- Taunggyi → Taunggese
- Tegal, Central Java → Tegalese
- Togo → Togolese
- Turin → Torinese
- Umm Al Quwain → Quwainese (also "Qewani")
- Vienna → Viennese
- Vietnam → Vietnamese
- Yap → Yapese

"-ese" is usually considered proper only as an adjective, or to refer to the entirety. Thus, "a Chinese person" is used rather than "a Chinese". Often used for Italian and East Asian, from the Italian suffix -ese, which is originally from the Latin adjectival ending -ensis, designating origin from a place: thus Hispaniensis (Spanish), Danensis (Danish), etc. The use in demonyms for Francophone locations is motivated by the similar-sounding French suffix -ais(e), which is at least in part a relative (< lat. -ensis or -iscus, or rather both).

-i(e), -i(ya), or -i(a)

Countries

- Afghanistan → Afghanistanis (also "Afghans")
- Azerbaijan → Azerbaijanis (less commonly "Azeris", also "Azerbaijanians")
- Bahrain → Bahrainis
- Bangladesh → Bangladeshis
- Eswatini (Swaziland) → Swazis, Swatis
- Iraq → Iraqis
- Israel → Israelis
- Kazakhstan → Kazakhstanis (also "Kazakhs")
- Kurdistan → Kurdistanis (also "Kurdish", "Kurds")
- Kuwait → Kuwaitis
- Kyrgyzstan → Kyrgyzstanis (also "Kyrgyz")
- Nepal → Nepalis (also "Nepalese")
- Oman → Omanis
- Pakistan → Pakistanis
- Qatar → Qataris
- Somalia → Somalis
- Tajikistan → Tajikistanis (also "Tajiks")
- Thailand → Thais
- Trinidad and Tobago → Trini
- Turkmenistan → Turkmenistanis (also "Turkmen")
- United Arab Emirates → Emiratis
- Uzbekistan → Uzbekistanis (also "Uzbeks")
- Yemen → Yemenis

States, provinces, counties, and cities

- Al Ain → Ainawi
- Allahabad → Allahabadis
- Azawad → Azawadis
- Azra → Azragis
- Balochistan → Balochistanis (also "Baloch", "Baluch", "Baluchi")
- Barisal → Barisalis (also "Borishali")
- Beirut → Beirutis
- Bangladesh, West Bengal → Bengalis
- Bharat → Bharatiya
- Bihar → Biharis
- Birmingham (UK) → Brummies
- Chhattisgarh → Chhattisgarhis
- Dagestan → Dagestanis
- Dhaka → Dhakaiya (also "Dhakaites")
- Faridabad → Faridabadis
- Glasgow → Weegie (predominantly used by those not from Glasgow, slightly pejorative), Glaswegian (better)
- Gujarat → Gujaratis
- Hatta → Hattawi
- Hazara → Hazaragis (also "Azragi")
- Hyderabad → Hyderabadis
- Karakalpakstan → Karakalpakstanis (also "Karakalpaks")
- Kashmir → Kashmiris
- Kerala → Malayalis (also "Malayalee", "Keralite")
- Kumaon → Kumaonis (also "Kumaiye")
- Lahore → Lahoris
- Punjab → Punjabis
- Rajasthan → Rajasthanis
- Rangpur → Rangpuris
- Sindh → Sindhis
- Sylhet → Sylhetis (also "Siloti")
- Tangail → Tangailia
- Tel Aviv → Tel Avivi (also "Tel Avivim" (plural))
- Yorkshire → Yorkies (also "Yorkshireman", "Tyke")
- Zanzibar → Zanzibaris

Mostly for Middle Eastern and South Asian locales. -i is encountered also in Latinate names for the various people that ancient Romans encountered (e.g. Allemanni, Helvetii). -i.e. is rather used for English places.

-iot or -iote

- Chios → Chiots
- Corfu → Corfiots
- Cyprus → Cypriots ("Cyprian" before 1960 independence of Cyprus)
- Phanar → Phanariotes

Used especially for Greek locations. Backformation from Cypriot, itself based in Greek -ώτης.

-k

- Greece → Greeks
- Slovakia → Slovaks
- Tajikistan → Tajiks (also "Tajikistani")

-asque

- Bergamo → Bergamasque
- Menton → Mentonasque
- Basque Country → Basque
- Sanremo → Sanremasque

Often used for Italian and French locations.

-(we)gian

- Dawei → Dawegians
- Galloway → Galwegians
- Galway → Galwegians
- Glasgow → Glaswegians
- Magway Region → Magwegians
- Norway → Norwegians
- Poway, California→ Powegians
- Tasmania→ Taswegians

-onian

- Aberdeen → Aberdonians
- Bath → Bathonians
- Connacht → Connachtonians
- Cork → Corkonians
- Dundee → Dundonians
- Halifax → Haligonians
- Lesotho → Lesothonians
- Newport → Newportonians
- Oxford → Oxonians

Often used for British and Irish locations.

-vian

- Barrow-in-Furness → Barrovians
- Harrow → Harrovians
- Moose Jaw → Moose Javians
- Oamaru → Oamaruvians
- Oslo → Oslovians
- Peru → Peruvians
- Warsaw → Warsovians
- Waterloo → Waterluvians
- Wythenshawe → Wythenshavians

-ois(e), -ais(e)

- Benin → Beninois(e) (also "Beninese")
- Gabon → Gabonais(e) (also "Gabonese")
- Niger → Nigerois(e) (also "Nigerien")
- Seychelles → Seychellois(e)
- Quebec → Quebecois(e) (also "Quebecker"; most common within Canada)

While derived from French, these are also official demonyms in English.

From Latin or Latinization

- Alsace → Alsatians (Alsatia)
- Annapolis → Annapolitans
- Argyll → Argathelians
- Ashbourne → Ashburnians (Essiburns)
- Cambridge → Cantabrigians
- Canterbury → Cantabrians
- Chester → Cestrians
- Colchester → Colcestrians
- Constantinople → Constantinopolitans (Constantinopolis)
- Courland → Couronians (Curonia)
- England → Anglican (Anglia)
- Exeter → Exonians
- Guernsey → Sarnians (Sarnia)
- Halifax → Haligonian
- Leeds → Leodensians (Ledesia)
- Lviv → Leopolitans (Leopolis)
- Manchester → Mancunians (Mancunia)
- Melbourne → Melburnians (Melburnia)
- Minneapolis → Minneapolitans
- Naples → Neapolitans (Neapolis)
- Newcastle → Novocastrians (Novum Castrum)
- Orkney Islands → Orcadians (Orcadia)
- Oswestry → Oswestrians (Oswestria)
- Shropshire & Shrewsbury → Salopians (Salopia)
- Tripoli → Tripolitans (Tripolis)
- Venice → Venetians
- Wolverhampton → Wulfrunians

Other

- Botswana → Motswana (singular) Batswana (plural)

== Prefixation ==
It is much rarer to find demonyms created with a prefix. Mostly they are from Africa and the Pacific, and are not generally known or used outside the country concerned. In much of East Africa, a person of a particular ethnic group will be denoted by a prefix. For example, a person of the Luba people would be a Muluba, the plural form Baluba, and the language, Kiluba or Tshiluba. Similar patterns with minor variations in the prefixes exist throughout on a tribal level. And Fijians who are indigenous Fijians are known as Kaiviti (Viti being the Fijian name for Fiji). On a country level:

- Botswana → Motswana (singular), Batswana (plural)
- Burundi → Umurundi (singular), Abarundi (plural)
- Eswatini → Liswati (singular), Emaswati (plural)
- Lesotho → Mosotho (singular), Basotho (plural)

== Non-standard examples ==
Demonyms may also not conform to the underlying naming of a particular place, but instead arise out of historical or cultural particularities that become associated with its denizens. In the United States such demonyms frequently become associated with regional pride such as "Burqueño" and the feminine "Burqueña" of Albuquerque, or with the mascots of intercollegiate sports teams of the state university system, take for example the sooner of Oklahoma and the Oklahoma Sooners.

Examples

Formal

- Aberdeenshire → Doric
- Albuquerque → Burqueños or the feminine Burqueñas (also "Albuquerqueans")
- Buenos Aires → Porteños
- Concepción, Chile → Penquistas
- Connecticut → Nutmeggers
- Cyprus → Cypriots
- Guinea Bissau → Bissau-Guinean
- Edinburgh → Lothian
- Lisbon → Alfacinha
- Indiana → Hoosiers
- Los Angeles → Angelenos
- Madagascar → Malagasy
- Massachusetts → Bay Staters
- North Macedonia → Macedonians
- Nunavut → Nunavummiut, Nunavummiuq (sing.)
- Minas Gerais → Mineiros
- Rio Grande do Norte → Potiguares
- Rio Grande do Sul → Gaúchos
- Rio de Janeiro (city) → Cariocas
- Rio de Janeiro (state) → Fluminense
- São Paulo (city) → Paulistanos
- São Paulo (state) → Paulistas
- Shropshire & Shrewsbury → Salopian
- Tierra Caliente → Calentano, Calentana, Guache, Guacha, Huache, Huacha
- Valparaíso → Porteños

Informal

- Australia → Aussie
- Birmingham, England → Brummie
- Medellin, Colombia → Paisas
- Canada → Canuck
- Cardiff → Taffs
- Devon → Janner
- Hartlepool, England → Monkey hanger
- Isle Of Wight → Caulkheads
- Plymouth → Janner
- Jersey → Jèrriais (adjectival), Jerseyman (demonym)
- Kansas → Jayhawker
- Liverpool, England → Scouser, Liverpudlian
- London, England → Cockney (specifically, someone from East London)
- Mexico → Azteca
- Middlesbrough, England → Smoggie
- Newcastle, Australia → Novocastrian
- Newcastle upon Tyne, England → Geordie
- Newfoundland, Canada → Newfie
- New Zealand → Kiwi
- Nigeria → Naija
- North Carolina → Tar Heel
- Philippines → Pinoy
- Pittsburgh, Pennsylvania, United States → Yinzer
- Peru → Inca (also Perulero)
- Puerto Rico → Boricua (from Taino Boriquen (transl. land of brave people))
- South Australia → Croweater
- Sunderland, England → Mackem
- Sydney, Australia → Sydneysider
- Ohio → Buckeye
- Oklahoma → Okie, Sooner
- Oldham, England → Yonner
- Tasmania → Taswegian
- United States → Yank or Yankee
- Upper Peninsula of Michigan → Yooper
- Wisconsin → Cheesehead

== Ethnonyms ==
Since names of places, regions and countries (toponyms) are morphologically often related to names of ethnic groups (ethnonyms), various ethnonyms may have similar, but not always identical, forms as terms for general population of those places, regions or countries (demonyms).

Examples
- Abkhazia → Abkhazians, Abkhaz
- Afghanistan → Afghans
- Albania → Albanians
- Algeria → Algerians
- Arab League → Arabs
- Australia → Australians, Aussies
- Azerbaijan → Azerbaijanis, Azeris
- Bashkortostan → Bashkirs
- Bengal → Bengali (also "Bengalese")
- Bulgaria → Bulgarians
- Canada → Canadians
- Cambodia → Khmers
- Chechnya → Chechens
- China → Chinese
- Cornwall → Cornish
- Croatia → Croats
- Czech Republic → Czechs
- Denmark → Danes
- Egypt → Egyptians
- England → English
- Eswatini (Swaziland) → Swazis, Swatis
- Finland → Finns
- Flanders → Flemings
- France → French
- United Kingdom → British
- Haiti → Haitian
- Hayastan → Hayastani (also "Armenians")
- Hungary → Hungarians, Magyars
- India → Indians
- Indonesia → Indonesians
- Ingushetia → Ingushians
- Iran → Iranians, Persians
- Ireland → Irish
- Jersey → Jerseymen, Jerseywomen
- Kalmykia → Kalmyks
- Karakalpakstan → Karakalpaks
- Karnataka → Kannadigas
- Kazakhstan → Kazakhs
- KwaZulu → Zulus
- Kurdistan → Kurds
- Kumaon → Kumaonis, Kumaiye
- Kyrgyzstan → Kyrgyzs
- Lapland → Sámi/Laplanders
- Madagascar → Malagasys
- Mali → Malis
- Malta → Maltese
- Mongolia → Mongols
- Montenegro → Montenegrins
- Morocco → Moroccans
- The Americas → Native Americans
- Netherlands → Dutch
- New Zealand → Kiwis
- Odisha → Odias
- Pakistan → Pakistani
- Palestine → Palestinians
- Philippines → Filipinos (for Men), Filipinas (for Women)
- Poland → Poles
- Scotland → Scots
- Serbia → Serbs
- Sorbia → Sorbs
- Slovakia → Slovaks
- Slovenia → Slovenes
- Somalia → Somalis
- Spain → Spanish
- Sweden → Swedes
- Tajikistan → Tajiks
- Tamil Nadu → Tamils
- Tatarstan →Tatars
- Thailand → Thais
- Turkey → Turks
- Turkmenistan → Turkmens
- Ulster → Ulstermen
- United States → Americans
  - Hawaii → Hawaiians, Kanaka Maoli
  - Louisiana → Louisianans, Cajuns, Creoles
  - New Mexico → New Mexicans, Hispanos
  - Texas → Texans, Tejanos
- Uzbekistan → Uzbeks
- Wales → Welsh
- Wallonia → Walloons

== Fiction ==
Literature and science fiction have created a wealth of gentilics that are not directly associated with a cultural group. These will typically be formed using the standard models above. Examples include Martian for hypothetical people of Mars (credited to scientist Percival Lowell), Gondorian for the people of Tolkien's fictional land of Gondor, and Atlantean for Plato's island Atlantis.

Other science fiction examples include Jovian for those of Jupiter or its moons and Venusian for those of Venus. Fictional aliens refer to the inhabitants of Earth as Earthling (from the diminutive -ling, ultimately from Old English -ing meaning "descendant"), as well as Terran, Terrene, Tellurian, Earther, Earthican, Terrestrial, and Solarian (from Sol, the sun).

Fantasy literature which involves other worlds or other lands also has a rich supply of gentilics. Examples include Lilliputians and Brobdingnagians, from the islands of Lilliput and Brobdingnag in the satire Gulliver's Travels.

In a few cases, where a linguistic background has been constructed, non-standard gentilics are formed (or the eponyms back-formed). Examples include Tolkien's Rohirrim (from Rohan), the Star Trek franchise's Klingons (with various names for their homeworld), and the Sangheili from the Halo franchise, (also known as Elites in the game by humans, as well as players) named after their homeworld of Sanghelios. In the books by Frank Herbert, the people from the planet Dune (or Arrakis) are the Fremen, but they are neither a nation nor a country.

== See also ==
- List of adjectival and demonymic forms of place names
  - List of adjectivals and demonyms for astronomical bodies
  - List of adjectivals and demonyms for continental regions
    - List of adjectivals and demonyms for subcontinental regions
  - List of adjectival and demonymic forms for countries and nations
    - List of adjectivals and demonyms for Australia
    - List of adjectivals and demonyms for Canada
    - List of adjectivals and demonyms for Cuba
    - List of adjectivals and demonyms for India
    - List of adjectivals and demonyms for Malaysia
    - List of adjectivals and demonyms for Mexico
    - List of adjectivals and demonyms for New Zealand
    - List of adjectivals and demonyms for the Philippines
    - List of adjectivals and demonyms for the United States
  - List of adjectivals and demonyms for former regions
    - List of adjectivals and demonyms for Greco-Roman antiquity
  - List of adjectivals and demonyms for fictional regions
  - List of adjectivals and demonyms for cities
- List of regional nicknames
- Macedonia naming dispute
- Nationality
- -onym, especially ethnonym and Endonym and exonym

== Sources ==
- Coates, Richard (2021). "Some thoughts on the theoretical status of ethnonyms and demonyms". Onomastica. 65 (2): 5–19. doi:10.17651/ONOMAST.65.2.1. S2CID 245777535.
- Roberts, Michael (2017). "The Semantics of Demonyms in English". The Semantics of Nouns. Oxford: Oxford University Press. pp. 205–220. ISBN 978-0-19-873672-1.
