= Habanera =

Habanera (feminine form of the Spanish word habanero, "from Havana") may refer to:

== Music ==
- Habanera or contradanza, a style of Cuban popular dance music of the 19th century
- Habanera, a work for violin and piano by Pablo de Sarasate, part of the Spanish Dances
- Habanera, a work for piano of 1885 by Emmanuel Chabrier, arranged for orchestra by him in 1888
- Habanera, composition for flute or violin & piano by Maurice Ravel
- Habanera, composition for cello and piano by Ernesto Halffter
- Habanera, guitar composition by Eduardo Sainz de la Maza
- Habanera, guitar composition by Xavier Montsalvatge
- "Habanera" (aria), popular name of an aria "L'amour est un oiseau rebelle" from Bizet's opera Carmen
- Habanera (John Harle album), a 1987 album by the English classical saxophonist John Harle
- Habanera, a 2000 album by Celia Cruz
- Habanera, a 2002 single by Scooter
- Habanera, classical album by Elīna Garanča
- Charanga Habanera, timba group
- La Habanera, song on album One Second by pop group Yello

== Film ==
- La Habanera (film), a 1937 German movie

== Animals ==
- Soritena habanera, species of tiger moth
- Volvarina habanera, sea snail

== Other ==
- Havaner lebn or Vida Habanera, a Cuban-Yiddish newspaper

== See also ==
- Habanero (disambiguation)
- Habano (disambiguation)
