= Stratton Library =

Stratton Library may refer to:

- Stratton Library, at Sheldon Jackson College
- Stratton Library, in the Cobb County Public Library System
