= Smyrna Public Library =

Coordinates: 33.8855°N 84.51725°W

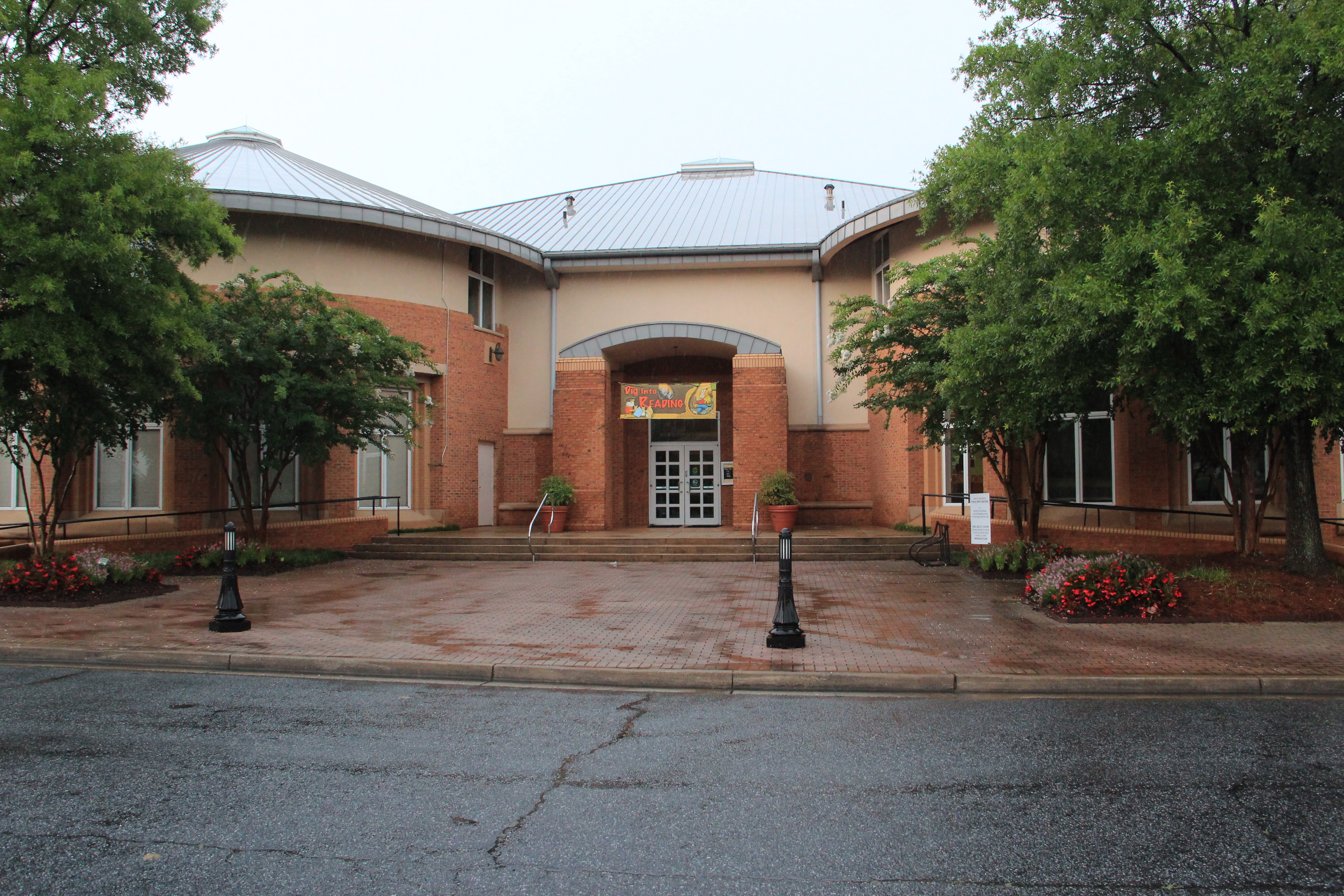
- Location: Smyrna, Georgia, United States
- Established: 1936

Collection
- Size: 89,845 (2013)

Access and use
- Circulation: 225,000 (2013)
- Population served: 53,000
- Members: 34,289 (2013)

Other information
- Director: Mary Moore

The Smyrna Public Library is an independent municipal library in the U.S. state of Georgia. It is located at 100 Village Green Circle in downtown Smyrna. Not only is it the only public library in the county that is not a part of the Cobb County Public Library System, but it is the only public library in the state that is not a part of a public library system at all.

An educational and cultural resource for the residents, the library offers a wide variety of services to the community. The library collection has grown to over 130,000 items in a wide variety of formats. Books, audiobooks on CD, and DVDs can all be checked out by cardholders. There is free Internet access.

The library's reference collection includes over 8,000 volumes, with special collections on military and genealogy. The children's department presents more than 40 programs a month, and was the recipient of the 2005 Georgia Library Association Eason Associates Program Award.

The Friends of the Smyrna Library is one of the largest "Library Friends" groups in Georgia. They raise money for library activities and sponsor monthly adult speaker programs, a book discussion group, art exhibits, an annual dinner theatre, and the Murder Goes South Mystery Festival.

== History ==
The Smyrna Women's Club and the Smyrna Men's Club provided the original financing and co-sponsored the first library, which officially opened on September 15, 1936, with few more than 600 books. Most were collected by young boys pulling their wagons from door to door and asking for books. Some of these books remain part of the library collection and are on display.

A single bookshelf in the Woman's Club located at the corner of Atlanta Road (old U.S. 41 and State Route 3) and Powder Springs Street (old State Route 5) was the home of Smyrna's first library collection. By 1938, 1,400 volumes were housed in their clubhouse, and in 1939, the Men's Club added a room to the Women's Clubhouse to accommodate the growing collection. This "new" library was located in the back of the Women's Clubhouse. A part-time librarian administered the collection, and ongoing funding was a joint venture of local citizens' support, the city of Smyrna, and the U.S. federal government.

The city council secured Works Projects Administration funds to help finance the project. The monthly income was 30 dollars: 20 from the WPA and five from each of the clubs. This contract was renewed each year until the WPA was abolished in the 1940s.

At that time, the city of Smyrna, with help from the state and county boards of education, continued to finance the library. The library was governed by a seven-member board of directors, and it continued to grow and have a prominent role in the community. In 1961, the city assumed full responsibility for funding the library and built a new library facility on King Street.

By 1986, the library was seriously overcrowded, and the mayor and the city council recognized the need for a new facility. A new library was recognized as an integral part of the first phase of the city's downtown revitalization program. In 1991, the city opened a new 28,000 square feet (2,600 m^{2}) facility. This nationally recognized building is based on the colonial Virginia capitol in Williamsburg. It features an open floor plan with large windows that provides a warm, inviting atmosphere to 250,000 annual visitors.
