= Atlanta Bread Company =

Fast-food chain of the United States

- Trade name: Atlanta Bread
- Type: Private
- Industry: Café; Bakery
- Genre: Fast casual
- Founded: 1993; 33 years ago Sandy Springs, Georgia
- Founder: Robert Auffenberg; Richard Auffenberg
- Headquarters: Smyrna, Georgia, U.S.
- Number of locations: 9 restaurants (2024)
- Area served: Georgia, North Carolina, South Carolina
- Key people: Jerry Couvaras, president & CEO; Basil Couvaras, VP COO
- Products: Soups, salads, sandwiches, pizza, pastas, and bakery items
- Revenue: US$122 million (2010) ▼US$0.831 million (2021)
- Number of employees: 5,000 (2004); 350 (2020)
- Website: www.atlantabread.com

Atlanta Bread Company is a privately owned American chain of bakery-café fast casual restaurants with 9 locations in Georgia and North Carolina. Its headquarters are in Smyrna, Georgia, a suburb northwest of Atlanta. Offerings include bakery items, pasta, salads, sandwiches, soups, and specialty drinks.

Aside from the bakery section, Atlanta Bread has a regular menu for dine-in or takeout including: flatbreads, paninis, salads, sandwiches, side choices, and soups, as well as coffee, espresso drinks, frozen drinks, fruit smoothies, hot chocolate, iced drinks, lattes, lemonade, and tea. Despite the similar name and type of outlets, Atlanta Bread carries no relation to the American bakery-café chain Panera Bread.

== History ==
Atlanta Bread was founded by Robert and Richard Auffenberg in 1993, in Sandy Springs, Georgia (part of the Atlanta metropolitan area), where it started as a single restaurant. In 1994, Jerry Couvaras moved to Atlanta and discovered the restaurant. That year, he joined the company as the manager of a restaurant location in Marietta, Georgia. Couvaras was born and raised in South Africa, and had previously worked as an investment banker. Couvaras was appointed as the Atlanta Bread Company's president and chief executive officer (CEO) in 1995, while his brother, Basil Couvaras, became the chief operating officer (COO) that year. By that time, the Couvaras brothers were selling franchises under the Atlanta Bread Company name.

By 1995, the owners began franchising and expanding across the country.

In 1999, Atlanta Bread Company was among the fastest-growing franchises in the United States, with plans to rapidly double its number of restaurant locations. That year, the Couvaras brothers settled a lawsuit filed by the Auffenbergs the previous year which alleged that they unfairly gained control and ownership of the business. The settlement required that the Couvaras brothers pay the Auffenbergs millions of dollars in royalties over the next 15 years.

In March 2004, Jerry Couvaras was arrested in Johannesburg, South Africa, and was charged with fraud after approximately 2,000 South Africans lost a total of $5.54 million as part of an alleged investment scheme that failed in 1993 after the liquidation of two investment companies. The charges were unrelated to the Atlanta Bread Company. Basil Couvaras was appointed to run the company while Jerry Couvaras — who remained as president and CEO — stayed in Johannesburg until the charges could be resolved. Basil Couvaras was later charged in the case as well.

In November 2004, Jerry and Basil Couvaras pleaded guilty to a banking violation and agreed to pay fines, while remaining fraud charges against them were dismissed. Jerry Couvaras said, "It was disappointing when it happened because we felt we had not done anything wrong. Unfortunately we had to plead to something. We felt the fine would be the quickest way to get back to doing our business." Company officials stated that the charges were related to a decade-old lawsuit that had previously been settled; Jerry Couvaras further stated, "I think people can really see through what's happened here. People can see what this was really about. I think it was really old animosity."

In 2004, Atlanta Bread Company had 5,000 employees and was one of the largest cafe and bakery chains in the United States, with 170 restaurant locations in 25 states. Sean Lupton-Smith was one of the company's most financially successful franchisees, with five locations that generated profits of nearly $2 million per year. In January 2007, Lupton-Smith sued the company for $12 million, alleging that the company had wrongfully terminated his ownership of the restaurants. Revenue and store locations decreased significantly after 2004, partially because of poor locations and issues with franchisees that included legal problems; the company had sued franchisees or had been sued eight times between 2001 and 2011.

In 2010, the company had a revenue of $122 million.

In 2011, the company had 74 locations in 20 states, including 13 company-owned stores; 44 stores had been closed since 2008, when the Great Recession began. Jerry Couvaras stated that the store closings were primarily part of a business strategy in order to gain revenue to remodel existing stores that were left open. Between 2001 and 2011, 66 loans from the Small Business Administration (SBA) were made to Atlanta Bread Company franchisees. Half of the loans failed, totaling $32.8 million, with a loss of $5 million for the United States federal government. As of 2011, Atlanta Bread Company ranked at number 11 on the SBA website's list of the 25 worst-performing large franchises.

Atlanta Bread Company has received accolades over its history, including being ranked in the top 100 of Fast Casual's "Movers & Shakers" in 2011.

As of November 2025, there were 9 restaurant locations in Georgia and North Carolina.

== See also ==
- List of bakery cafés
