= Havana (given name) =

Havana is a feminine given name.

Notable people with the name include:

- Havana Brown (born 1985), Australian DJ, singer, songwriter, record producer and dancer
- Havana Harris (born 2006), Australian rules footballer for the Gold Coast Suns
- Havana Hopman (born 2003), New Zealand individual rhythmic gymnast
- Havana Mena (c. 2000–), Latin musician
- Havana Rose Liu (born 1997), American actress and model
- Havana Solaun (born 1993), association footballer for Houston Dash

== Animals ==
- Havana Grey (foaled 2015), British Thoroughbred racehorse and sire
