= Potiguar =

Potiguar may refer to:

- Demonym of Rio Grande do Norte state, Brazil
- Potiguara people
- Campeonato Potiguar, a Brazilian football (soccer) competition
- Associação Cultural e Desportiva Potiguar, a Brazilian football (soccer) club
- Associação Cultural e Desportiva Potyguar Seridoense, a Brazilian football (soccer) club
