= Smyrna Heights =

Coordinates: 33°52′20″N 84°31′23″W

- Neighborhood
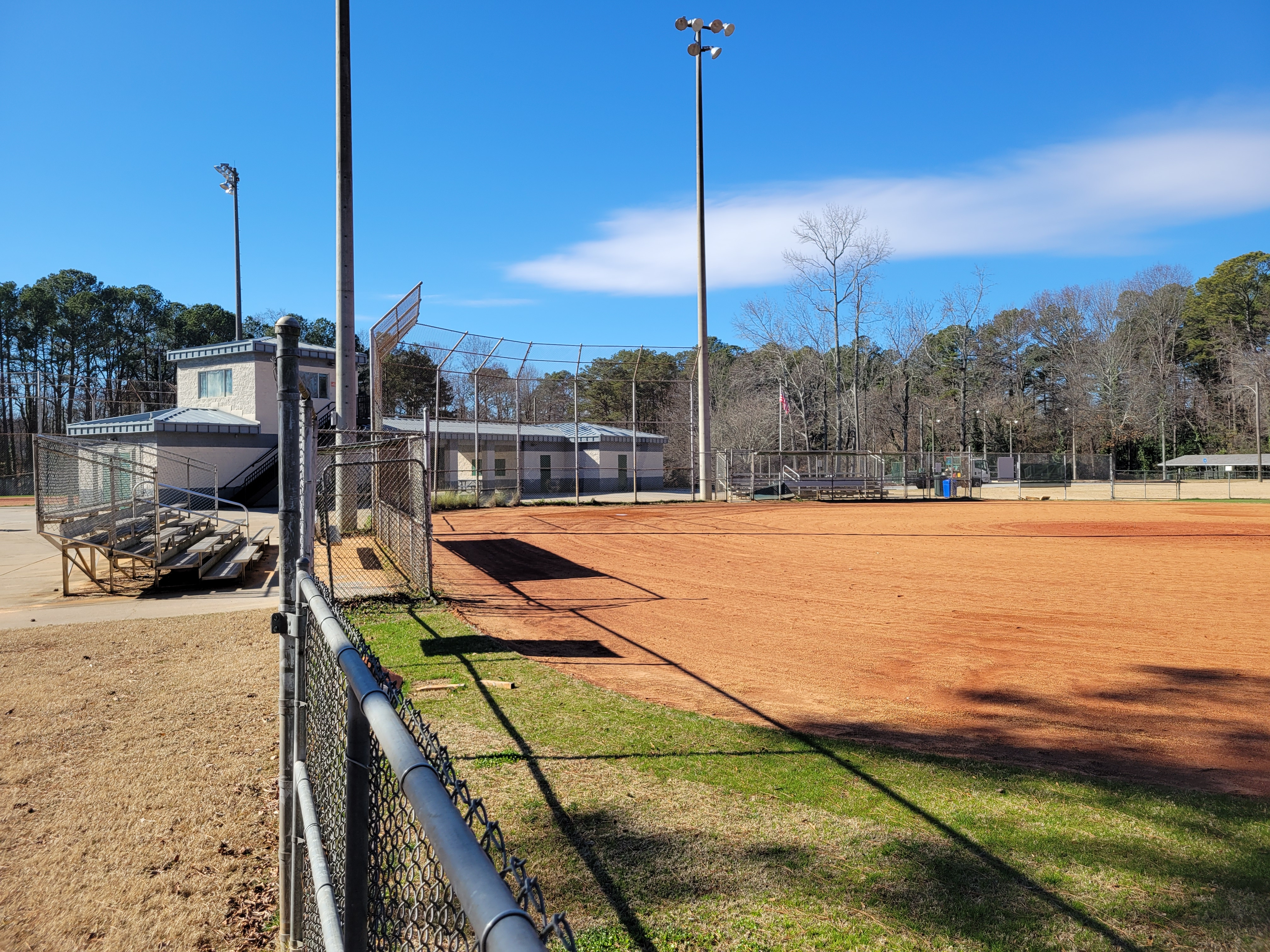
- Tolleson Park
- Interactive map of Smyrna Heights
- Country: United States
- State: Georgia
- County: Cobb County
- City: City of Smyrna
- Ward: 4
- ZIP Code: 30080

Smyrna Heights is a neighborhood of Smyrna, Georgia, United States, built in the 1950s.

== Education ==
- Cobb County Public Schools

== Parks ==
- Tolleson Park
- Askew Park
- Brinkley Park
