= Habana (disambiguation) =

La Habana is the Spanish name for Havana, the capital of Cuba.

Habana may also refer to:

== Music ==
- Habana (album), a 1997 album by Roy Hargrove's Crisol
- "Habana" (song), a 2004 song by Miguel Bosé
- "Habana", by Bebo Valdés from Cuban Dance Party, 1959

== Places ==
=== Cuba ===
- La Habana Province
- Habana Formation, a geologic formation in Cuba

=== Other countries ===
- Habana, Queensland, a small town in Australia
- Habana District, Moyobamba, Peru

== Sport ==
- FC La Habana, Cuban football team
- Habana (Cuban League), a baseball team which played in the Cuban League from 1878 to 1961

== Other uses ==
- Bryan Habana (born 1983), South African rugby player
- Cyclone Habana, a 2021 tropical cyclone in the South-West Indian ocean
- Habana (steamship), Spanish ship

== See also ==
- Havana (disambiguation)
- Habana Abierta, a Cuban band
- Habana Blues, a 2005 Spanish-Cuban film directed and co-written by Benito Zambrano
- Habana Eva, a 2010 Venezuelan film
