= Cobb County Public Library System =

Public library system in Georgia, USA

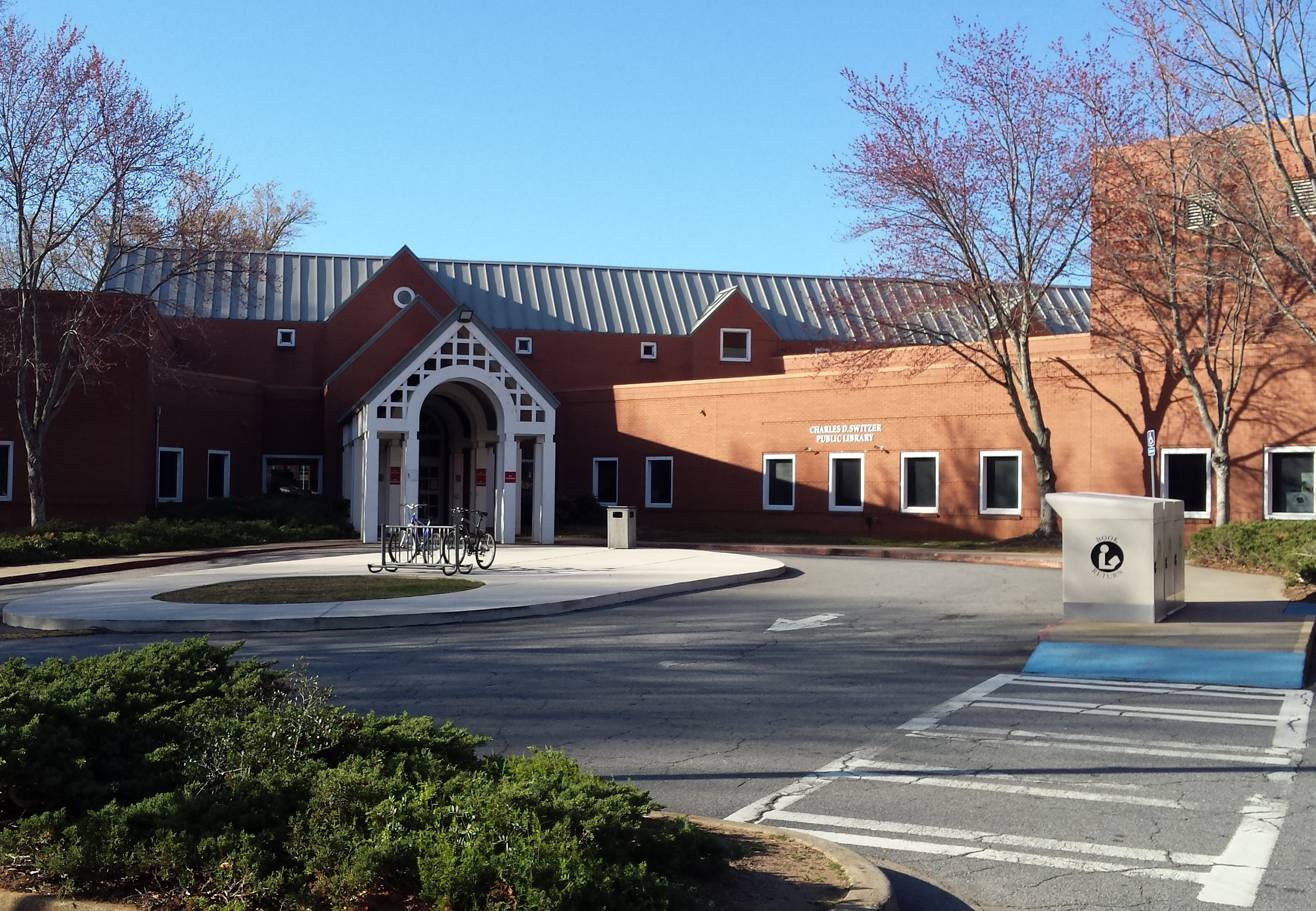
- Charles D. Switzer Library
- 33°57′0.3672″N 84°32′38.2992″W
- Location: Cobb County, Georgia
- Established: 1969
- Branches: 15

Collection
- Size: 1,252,626 (2020)

Access and use
- Circulation: 2,851,855 (2020)
- Population served: 790,588 (2020)
- Members: 447,378 (2020)

Other information
- Budget: $11.3 million (2014)
- Director: Helen Poyer
- Website: http://www.cobbcat.org/

The Cobb County Public Library System (CCPLS) is a system of 15 public libraries in Cobb County, Georgia, United States, excluding its second-largest city of Smyrna, which runs its own Smyrna Public Library. CobbCat.org is the online database of all CCPLS holdings.

The CCPLS uses an interlibrary loan system among all 15 branches, and allows for loan requests from other counties and areas through WorldCat. Those with a valid library card in the Cobb Country Library system can reserve materials online and pick them up in their local library. Books may be returned at any library in the system.

== History ==
=== Initial libraries ===
Cobb County's first library was the Marietta Young Men's Debating and Library Association, which debuted in 1874. For eight years this was the sole library of the county, until the opening of the Franklin Lending Library in 1882. With two libraries now present in the county the Marietta Library Association was founded in 1883. The first library building opened on Church Street, Marietta, and was named the Sarah Freeman Clarke Library in honor of the woman who housed the initial Franklin Lending Library collection in her home. Following the opening of the Marietta Library Association, Acworth opened its first library, the Carrie Dyer Reading Club, in 1889. Austell opened its first library through the Austell Woman's Club near the end of the 1920s, and the Smyrna Public Library was founded in this decade as well.

=== Cobb County-Marietta Public Library Board ===
In 1948 the Cobb County Board of Education established the Cobb County Library, taking advantage of state matching funds in order to secure monies for books to support a future county library system. During this time, and into the early 1950s, J. Dennis Kemp became concerned about the lack of library resources in unincorporated areas of Cobb County, and went to the county commissioner to see if library outreach could be afforded to these communities. A county-appointed study committee created in 1956 began to explore the possibilities of joining the Cobb County library collection with the existing Clarke Library. The next year the committee finalized a merger, creating the Cobb County-Marietta Public Library Board, and two years later in 1959 they combined and brought the Clarke and Fort Hill libraries to the system. Prior to this acquisition the Fort Hill branch was, for many decades, the only library black people could utilize. At its inception this county library system consisted of 25,000 books with a budget of $10,500 split into thirds by the city school system, county school system, and the county government.

With the library outreach committee continuing to explore areas of Cobb County to branch into, plans were made to grow the library system. In the late 1950s, the Clarke Library moved to a larger building, the old U.S. Post Office, and had two bookmobiles serving rural regions. Seeing the success of the library system, the library board decided to construct branch libraries in growing towns with sufficient population densities. Thus, an onslaught of new libraries joined the system.

=== Growth ===
In 1961 two branches in East Marietta and Powder Springs were added, and in 1962 South Cobb's previously private branch joined the system alongside the Oakdale (now Lewis A. Ray) Branch. In 1963 the Acworth Library joined, a new branch was established in Kennesaw, and Central Library moved into the building previously occupied by the old Marietta Post Office (currently the Marietta/Cobb Museum of Art). In 1964 and 1965 the Gritters and Sweetwater Valley branches respectively joined the system.

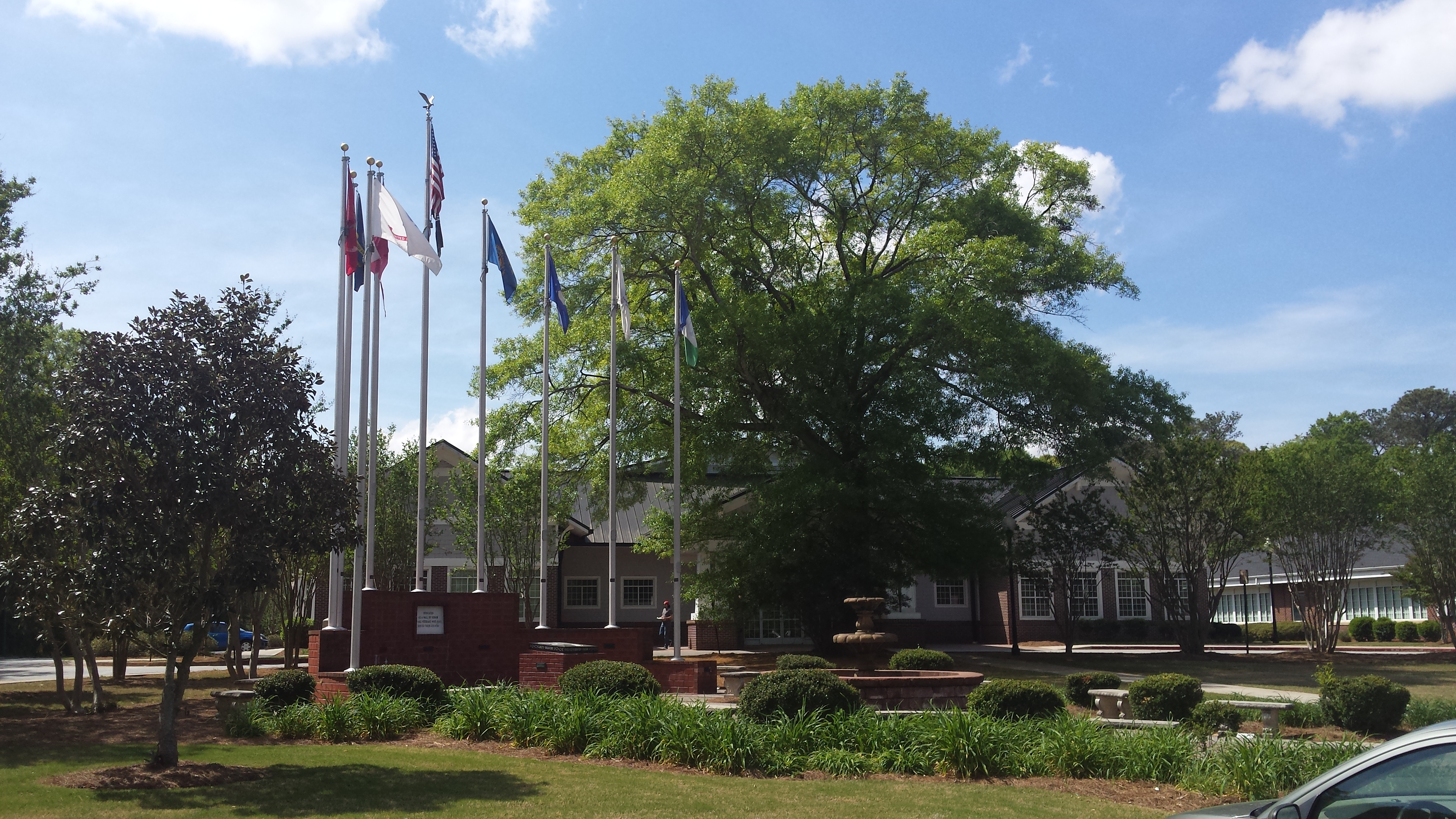
The Veterans Park, located at the Powder Springs Library branch

With a rapidly growing number of branches, a 1965 voters' referendum authorized $985,000 of library bonds to be divided into library construction, land purchases, books, supplies, and equipment for the system. Due to this bond, from 1966 to 1969 seven new libraries were added: Kennesaw, East Marietta, Acworth, South Cobb, Sibley, Lewis A. Ray, and Powder Springs. All seven opened on the same day in 1967, and were met with public approval.

With such a large number of libraries representing much more than just Marietta, the system changed its name to the present-day Cobb County Public Library System in 1969. The Stratton branch was added in 1974, and the Merchant's Walk branch was added in 1979. In 1978 taxpayers overwhelmingly approved a $7.16 million library issue to renovate and expand the Switzer (then Central) library to 64,000 square feet, and construct the Kemp Memorial Library, Mountain View Library, and Vinings Library. The money was also used to renovate the Kennesaw and Powder Springs branches. By the early 1980s the system had grown to fourteen libraries with an annual budget of $1.5 million and passed one million materials circulated annually. The Fort Hill library was rededicated as the Hattie G. Wilson library in memory of the late librarian's 33 years of service. The final two libraries added to the sixteen-branch system were the Mountain View and Vinings libraries, constructed in 1989 and 1990 respectively.

During the 1990s the population of Cobb County began to grow rapidly. The speed of the system's growth was unable to meet the needs of the growing population, and the amount of books in the collection dropped below one book per citizen. In July 1991 the Friends of the Library and the CCPLS urged the passage of a new $7.06 million bond referendum in order to provide enough books to meet the success of neighboring library systems. Ultimately this bond referendum did not pass by 814 out of 60,000 votes.

=== Modern years ===
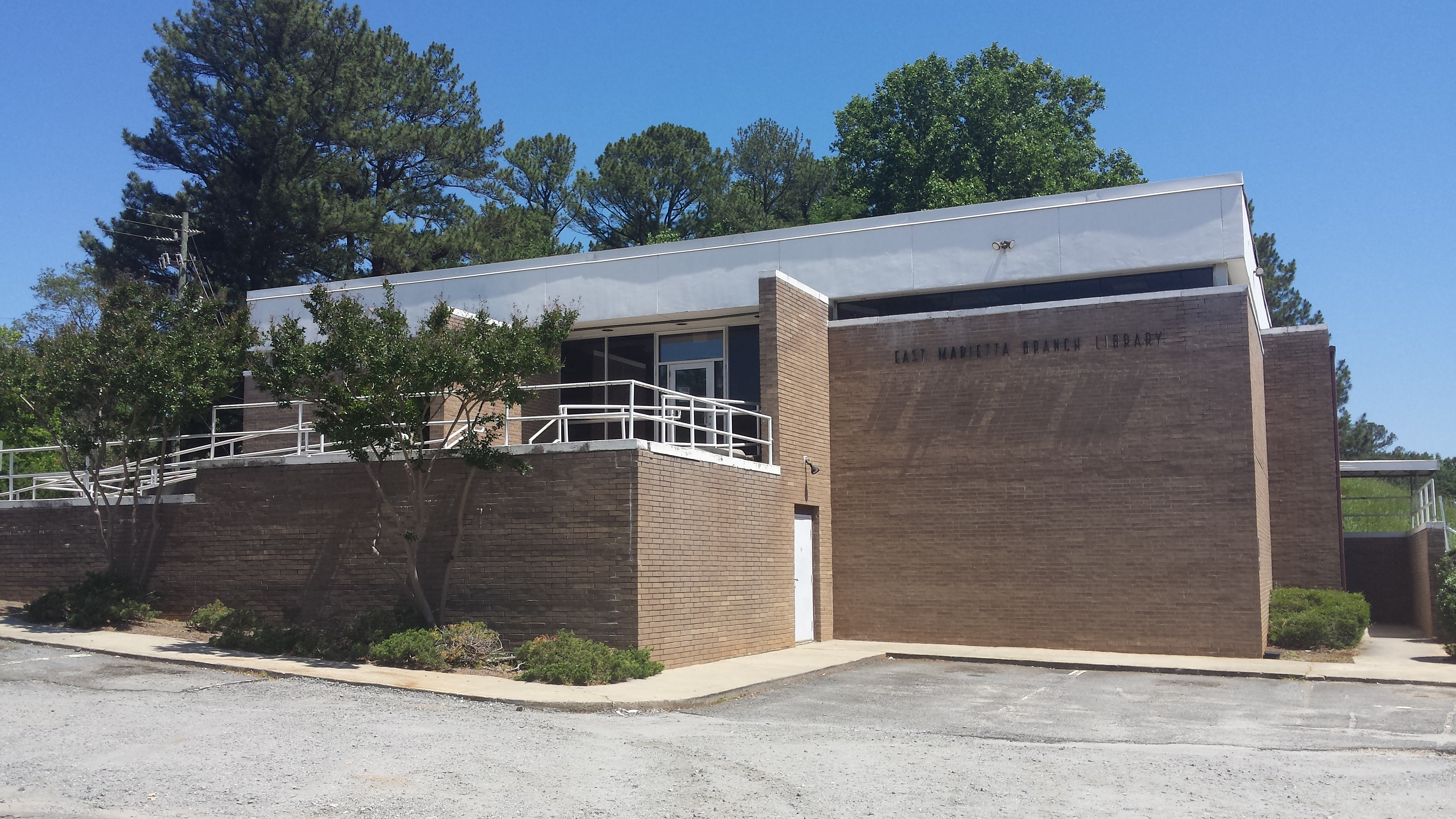
The old East Marietta Branch Library, which was replaced by the Sewell Mill Library and Cultural Center

The Cobb County Library System has continued to see growth into the 21st century. In 2002 a library in West Cobb opened, and in 2005 the South Cobb Regional Library opened. In 2007 a new building was secured in Powder Springs, and their town library moved to its new location on Atlanta Road.

In 2010 the East Cobb Library replaced the previously built Merchant's Walk Library and doubled the amount of floor space for books and technological improvements. While interest in libraries in this area of Cobb County was high, the Hattie G. Wilson (formerly Fort Hill) library began to show signs of disuse. Citing a 50% loss of circulation, the Wilson Library was unanimously voted to shut down in 2013.

Another renovation was approved in 2016 when the East Marietta Library was chosen for a new location and new building. This new facility, the Sewell Mill Library and Cultural Center, opened on December 4, 2017 at a cost of $10.6 million. It was built in conjunction with the Cobb County Parks Department, and, in addition to a large collection of books, also has a black box theater, open-air amphitheater, art galleries and classrooms, and many individual and group conference rooms.

In 2023, Cobb County Public Library was selected as the Georgia Library of the Year.

== Public libraries ==
Library	Neighborhood served	Image	Founded	Location	Notes
East Cobb Library	East Cobb County		2010	4880 Lower Roswell Road, Marietta, GA 30068	Formerly the Merchant's Walk Library, built in 1974, this library was sold for $1.3 million to develop a shopping center. The library opened on February 1, 2010. It is currently leased in the shopping center until construction on the new building begins nearby.
Gritters Library	Shaw Park Area		1964	880 Shaw Park Road, Marietta, GA 30066	"Gritters" comes from the era when there were military districts. The 911th Militia District, known as Gritters, was officially organized in 1839. Legend has it that an early grist mill in the area was known for gritty meal, and thus the library was named Gritters Mill. Gritters was built in 1972 and opened on November 19, 1973.
Kemp Memorial Library	West Cobb County		1989	4029 Due West Road, Marietta, GA 30064	The property was donated by Frances Kemp Whitlow, for whom the library is named. The library boasts an open air and natural light building.
Lewis A. Ray Library	Smyrna, Georgia		1967	4500 Oakdale Road, Smyrna, GA 30080	Originally known as the Oakdale library, it was renamed in 1967 in honor of the Chairman of the Cobb County-Marietta Library Board, Dr. Lewis A. Ray, a dentist.
Mountain View Regional Library	East Cobb County		1989	3320 Sandy Plains Road, Marietta, GA 30066	This was the largest library branch in the system at the time of completion, and, due to its proximity to four high schools, the busiest. It underwent a major renovation in 2008, expanding the children's department and modernizing its technology and furniture.
North Cobb Regional Library	Kennesaw, Georgia		2019	3535 Old 41 Highway, Kennesaw, GA 30144	This library opened in September 2019 as a consolidation of the Kennesaw and Acworth branches. It has a teen area, makerspace, computer lab, and outdoor plaza. The children's area features learning toys.
Powder Springs Library	Powder Springs, Georgia		1961	4181 Atlanta Street, Bldg 1, Powder Springs, GA 30127	This library moved to a new facility in January 2008, on the site of the old Powder Springs Elementary School. It features dedicated children's and adult services areas and a meeting room, conceived in a style reminiscent of the old elementary school, which is named for Luke Penn, the school's longtime custodian.
Sewell Mill Library and Cultural Center	East Marietta Area		2017	2051 Lower Roswell Road, Marietta, GA 30068	This was constructed in 2017 to replace the East Marietta Branch Library, which had been standing since 1961. It was created alongside the parks department, and has many features which set it aside from other libraries in the system, such as a black box theater and art gallery.
Sibley Library	Fair Oaks, Marietta, Georgia		1967	1539 South Cobb Drive, Marietta, GA 30060	It is named after the first librarian of the system, Ms. Florence Weldon Sibley, known affectionately as "Miss Tib". As a member of a wealthy, prominent family, most of her salary was donated toward library operations.
South Cobb Regional Library	Mableton, Georgia		1962	805 Clay Road, Mableton, GA 30126	This was originally a private library that joined the system in 1962. Its new location was completed in 2006.
Stratton Library	Marietta, Georgia		1974	1100 Powder Springs Rd. SW, Marietta, GA 30064	It is named after the first director of the library system, Joanne P. Stratton.
Sweetwater Library	Austell, Georgia		1913	5000 Austell-Powder Springs Road Suite 123, Austell, GA 30106	It was formed by the Austell Woman's Club. As one of their first projects, it moved in 1922 to their headquarters, and again in 1950 to its own building. The Sweetwater Library joined the Cobb County Library System in 1966. In 2001, the library purchased an historic three-story thread mill, and by 2003 had fully moved into its new location.
Switzer Library	Marietta, Georgia		1963	226 Roswell Street, Marietta, GA 30060	Originally known as the Central Library, the name was changed in 2013 to honor longtime trustee Charles D. Switzer. Its initial iteration existed in the old Marietta Post Office, and, upon a $7.1 million library bond issue, constructed the new building, which opened in 1989. The Switzer Library is home to the Georgia Room, a genealogical and local history special collection. The Georgia Room was founded in 1970 through the generous bequest of Miss Virginia Vanstone Crosby, in memory of her father, Charles Mayo Crosby.
Vinings Library	Vinings, Georgia		1990	4290 Paces Ferry Road, Atlanta, GA 30339	This was the sixteenth branch to be added to the system, and was built from funds from the 1986 bond issue.
West Cobb Regional Library	Kennesaw, Georgia		2002	1750 Dennis Kemp Lane, Kennesaw, GA 30152	This serves as a reference and training resource for the other West Cobb branches, while still functioning as a regular library. Opened in May 2022.

== Library systems in neighboring counties ==
- Bartow County Library System to the northwest
- Sequoyah Regional Library System to the north
- Fulton County Library System to the south and east
- West Georgia Regional Library System to the south and west
