= Strathcona (sternwheeler) =

Strathcona was a stern-wheel steamboat. Strathcona was built in 1898 to work for the Hudson's Bay Company. Originally she saw service on the Stikine River from 1898 to 1900. In 1901 she did service between Port Essington to Hazelton on the Skeena River. But she only did this trip once and retired from the Hudson Bay Company.

The steamer also helped do the service on the Sidney and Nanaimo ferry route starting on June 24, 1902, replacing the Iroquois. This service was called the Sidney and Nanaimo Transportation Company. The service also made stops in the Gulf Islands. She was soon replaced by the SS Iroquois. Strathcona had worked for three months of that year before she blew a cylinder on August 19, 1902. The ship was unable to be repaired, so she was retired from S&NT immediately and replaced.

Owner(s) In 1898-1901 she was owned by the Hudsons Bay Company, London UK. In 1901-1902 she was owned by Charles Spratt, Victoria BC. She was sold to Sidney & Nanaimo Transportation Co. In 1910 she was owned by William A. Rannie et al., Vancouver BC.

The stern-wheeler's true end is unknown. She was beached and stripped on one of the Gulf Islands.
