= Smyrna, Georgia =

- City
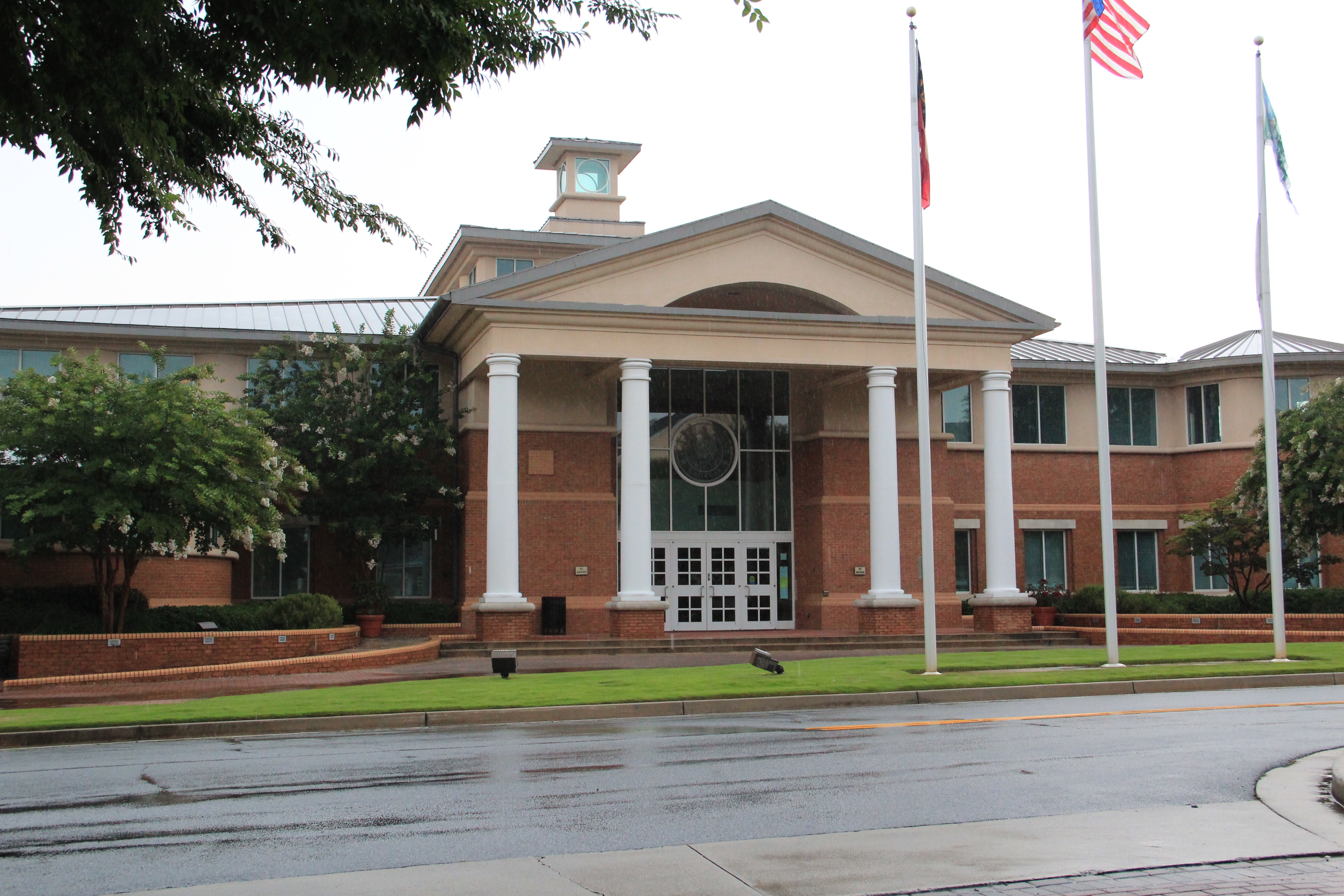
- Smyrna City Hall

- Flag Seal
- Location in Cobb County and the state of Georgia
- Coordinates: 33°52′19″N 84°31′6″W
- Country: United States
- State: Georgia
- County: Cobb
- Established: 1832

Government
  - Mayor: Derek Norton

Area
  - Total: 15.61 sq mi (40.42 km^{2})
  - Land: 15.56 sq mi (40.31 km^{2})
  - Water: 0.042 sq mi (0.11 km^{2})
- Elevation: 1,060 ft (323 m)

Population (2020)
  - Total: 55,663
  - Density: 3,576/sq mi (1,381/km^{2})
- Demonym: Smyrnite
- Time zone: UTC-5 (Eastern (EST))
  - Summer (DST): UTC-4 (EDT)
- ZIP Codes: 30080–30082, 30126
- Area codes: 770/678/470
- FIPS code: 13-71492
- GNIS feature ID: 0356541
- Website: smyrnaga.gov

Smyrna is a city in Cobb County, Georgia, United States. It is located northwest of Atlanta, and is in the inner ring of the Atlanta Metropolitan Area. It is included in the Atlanta–Sandy Springs–Alpharetta MSA, which is included in the Atlanta–Athens-Clarke–Sandy Springs CSA.

From 2000 to 2012, Smyrna grew by 28%. Historically it is one of the fastest-growing cities in the state, and one of the most densely populated cities in the metropolitan area. In the 2020 Census, Smyrna's population was 55,663.

== History ==
Pioneers began settling the area in 1832. By the late 1830s, a religious encampment called Smyrna Camp Ground had become a popular travel destination and was well known throughout Georgia. It is a Greek name for the Biblical city of Smyrna, modern day İzmir in Turkey, the home of the Christian martyr Polycarp. After the completion of the Western and Atlantic Railroad in 1842, the area began to grow. It was known by several names until 1872—Varner's Station, Ruff's Siding, Neal Dow, and Ruff's Station. The city was incorporated with the name Smyrna in 1872.

Two Civil War battles occurred in the area, the Battle of Smyrna Camp Ground and the Battle of Ruff's Mill, both on July 4, 1864. The area's businesses, homes, and 1849 covered bridge (since rebuilt and still in use today) were burned by Sherman's troops.

The nearby Bell Bomber plant that produced B-29 bombers during World War II was reopened by Lockheed in 1951, and became a catalyst for growth. The city's population grew during the next two decades, from 2,005 in 1950 to almost 20,000 by 1970.

== Geography ==
Smyrna is part of the Atlanta metropolitan area, located about 1 mile (1.6 km) northwest of the Atlanta city limits, and with Smyrna's downtown approximately 16 miles (26 km) from downtown Atlanta. Smyrna is located just west of the northern intersection of I-285 and I-75, which is the site of the edge city Cumberland and the Cobb Galleria.

Smyrna is bordered by Vinings to the east, Marietta to the north and west, and Mableton to the south and southwest. The city of Sandy Springs and the affluent Atlanta neighborhoods of Paces and Buckhead are approximately within 10 miles of Smyrna's center. Smyrna Heights is a neighborhood in Smyrna.

According to the United States Census Bureau, the city has a total area of 15.4 square miles (39.9 km^{2}), of which 15.4 square miles (39.8 km^{2}) is land and 0.04 square miles (0.1 km^{2}), or 0.23%, is water. The general terrain of the area is characteristic of the Piedmont region of Georgia, characterized by hills with broad ridges, sloping uplands, and relatively narrow valleys.

=== Flora ===
The city's official symbol is the jonquil (a flower). Known as the "Jonquil City", it derives this name from the thousands of jonquils that flourish in gardens and along the streets in early spring.

=== Climate ===
Climate data for Smyrna, GA
Month	Jan	Feb	Mar	Apr	May	Jun	Jul	Aug	Sep	Oct	Nov	Dec	Year
Record high °F (°C)	79 (26)	80 (27)	89 (32)	93 (34)	97 (36)	102 (39)	105 (41)	104 (40)	102 (39)	95 (35)	84 (29)	79 (26)	105 (41)
Mean daily maximum °F (°C)	52 (11)	57 (14)	65 (18)	73 (23)	80 (27)	86 (30)	89 (32)	88 (31)	82 (28)	73 (23)	64 (18)	54 (12)	72 (22)
Mean daily minimum °F (°C)	34 (1)	38 (3)	44 (7)	52 (11)	60 (16)	68 (20)	71 (22)	71 (22)	65 (18)	54 (12)	45 (7)	37 (3)	53 (12)
Record low °F (°C)	−8 (−22)	−9 (−23)	10 (−12)	25 (−4)	37 (3)	39 (4)	53 (12)	55 (13)	36 (2)	28 (−2)	3 (−16)	0 (−18)	−9 (−23)
Average precipitation inches (mm)	4.20 (107)	4.83 (123)	4.81 (122)	3.36 (85)	3.67 (93)	3.95 (100)	5.27 (134)	3.90 (99)	4.47 (114)	3.41 (87)	4.10 (104)	3.90 (99)	49.87 (1,267)

== Demographics ==
Historical population
Census	Pop.	Note	%±
1880	259		—
1890	416		60.6%
1900	238		−42.8%
1910	599		151.7%
1920	791		32.1%
1930	1,178		48.9%
1940	1,440		22.2%
1950	2,005		39.2%
1960	10,157		406.6%
1970	19,157		88.6%
1980	20,312		6.0%
1990	30,981		52.5%
2000	40,999		32.3%
2010	51,265		25.0%
2020	55,663		8.6%
2025 (est.)	57,513	▲	3.3%
U.S. Decennial Census; 1850-1870 1870-1880; 1890-1910 1920-1930; 1940 1950 1960; 1970 1980 1990; 2000 2010 2020; 2025

=== Racial and ethnic composition ===
Smyrna city, Georgia – Racial and ethnic composition Note: the US Census treats Hispanic/Latino as an ethnic category. This table excludes Latinos from the racial categories and assigns them to a separate category. Hispanics/Latinos may be of any race.
Race / Ethnicity (NH = Non-Hispanic)	Pop 2000	Pop 2010	Pop 2020	% 2000	% 2010	% 2020
White alone (NH)	21,936	23,871	24,159	53.50%	46.56%	43.40%
Black or African American alone (NH)	10,963	15,801	17,032	26.74%	30.82%	30.60%
Native American or Alaska Native alone (NH)	102	110	103	0.25%	0.21%	0.19%
Asian alone (NH)	1,598	2,476	3,698	3.90%	4.83%	6.64%
Native Hawaiian or Pacific Islander alone (NH)	12	24	21	0.03%	0.05%	0.04%
Other race alone (NH)	98	219	419	0.24%	0.43%	0.75%
Mixed race or Multiracial (NH)	631	1,128	2,566	1.54%	2.20%	4.61%
Hispanic or Latino (any race)	5,659	7,642	7,665	13.80%	14.91%	13.77%
Total	40,999	51,271	55,663	100.00%	100.00%	100.00%

=== 2020 census ===
As of the 2020 census, Smyrna had a population of 55,663. There were 24,600 households and 13,669 families residing in the city. The median age was 35.4 years. 21.4% of residents were under the age of 18 and 10.6% were 65 years of age or older. For every 100 females there were 89.0 males, and for every 100 females age 18 and over there were 85.5 males age 18 and over.

Of the 24,600 households, 28.7% had children under the age of 18 living in them. Married-couple households accounted for 39.1% of all households, 20.1% had a male householder with no spouse or partner present, and 33.9% had a female householder with no spouse or partner present. About 35.1% of households were made up of individuals, and 7.7% had someone living alone who was 65 years of age or older.

There were 26,415 housing units, of which 6.9% were vacant. The homeowner vacancy rate was 1.9% and the rental vacancy rate was 9.1%.

100.0% of residents lived in urban areas, while 0.0% lived in rural areas.

Racial composition as of the 2020 census
Race	Number	Percent
White	25,394	45.6%
Black or African American	17,415	31.3%
American Indian and Alaska Native	259	0.5%
Asian	3,724	6.7%
Native Hawaiian and Other Pacific Islander	26	0.0%
Some other race	3,444	6.2%
Two or more races	5,401	9.7%

=== Personal income ===
The median household income in 2018 was $73,788. The per capita income was $44,823, a 24.7% increase from 2000.

In 2018, the place with the highest median household income in Smyrna was census tract 312.09, with a value of $143,443, followed by census tracts 311.12 and 311.17, with respective values of $108,229 and $89,769.

== Economy ==
=== Industry ===
The Atlanta Bread Company has its headquarters in Smyrna.

Companies with an office include Eaton Corporation and IBM. Smyrna was the site of the corporate offices of the now-defunct World Championship Wrestling.

==== Top employers ====
According to the city's 2022 Annual Comprehensive Financial Report, the top employers in the city are:

#	Employer	Employees
1	United Distributors	800
2	Glock	638
3	UCB	499
4	Publix	384
5	City of Smyrna	381
6	RV Behavioral LLC	350
7	FedEx Freight	282
8	The Kroger Company	244
9	Roman Catholic Archdiocese of Atlanta	200
10	Delmar Gardens of Smyrna, LLC	183

On October 31, 2014, Emory Healthcare closed the Emory Adventist Hospital at Smyrna. They have since announced plans to renovate and reopen the hospital.

==== Private projects ====
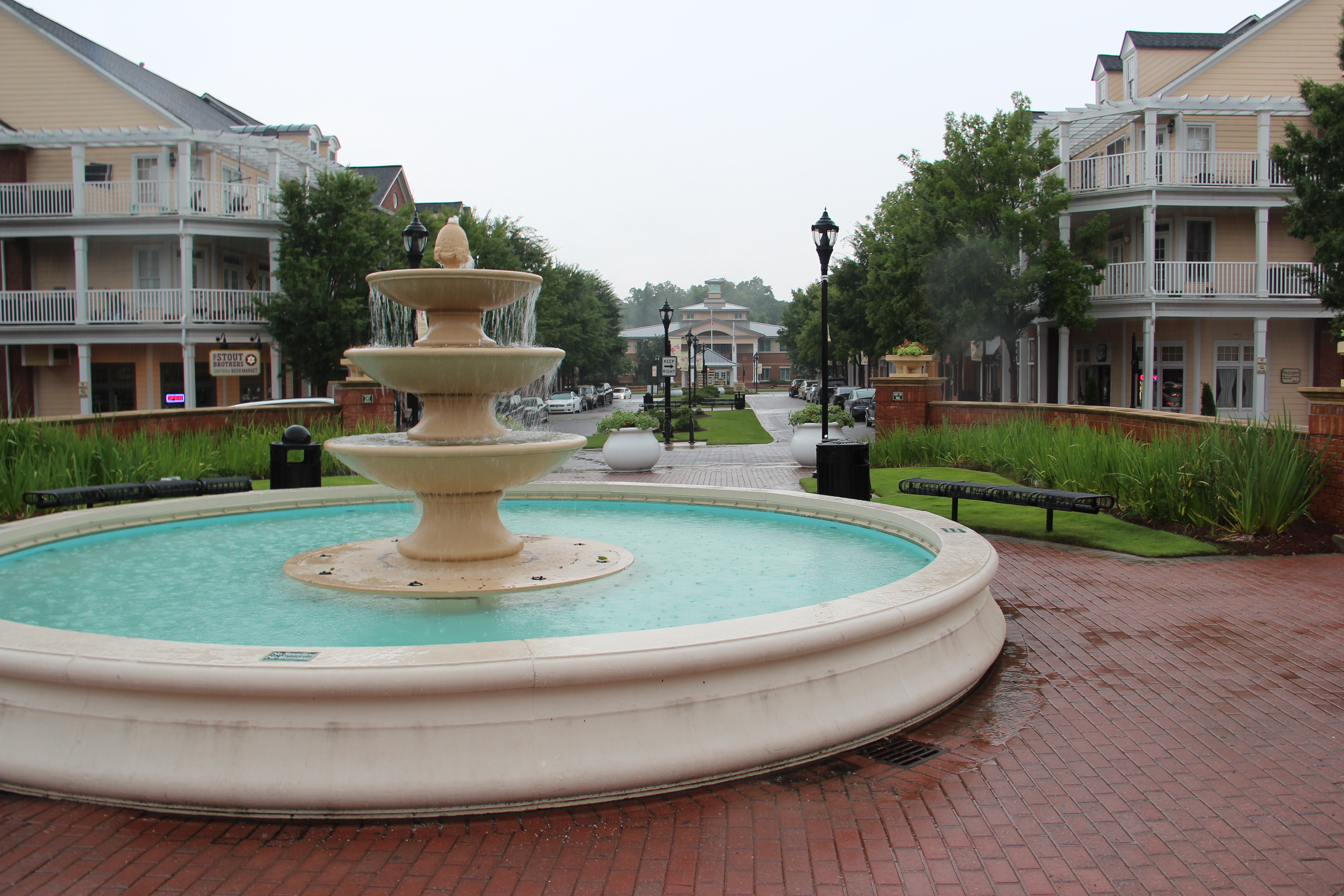
Market Village

In 1991, the city began a community redevelopment project known as "Market Village," in order to create a well-defined downtown. Included were a community center and 28,000-square-foot (2,600 m^{2}) public library. A mixed retail and residential district was modeled after an early 1900s city village, including a square with a fountain. This, and other expansions have revitalized the downtown area. Further redevelopment has occurred throughout the city—including thousands of new homes – mostly cluster homes, townhouse and condo communities replacing older neighborhoods. The population has risen as a result of redevelopment, a few annexations, and Smyrna's location as a residential suburb in the Northwest center of metro Atlanta.

==== Public projects ====
In September 2019, the James M. Cox Foundation gave $6 million to the PATH Foundation, which will connect the Silver Comet Trail terminus in Smyrna to the Atlanta Beltline. It is expected to be completed by 2022. The combined length of the Silver Comet and the Beltline will make it the longest paved trail surface in the U.S., totaling approximately 300 miles (480 kilometers); one could travel from Atlanta to Anniston, Alabama via the trail alone.

== Arts and culture ==
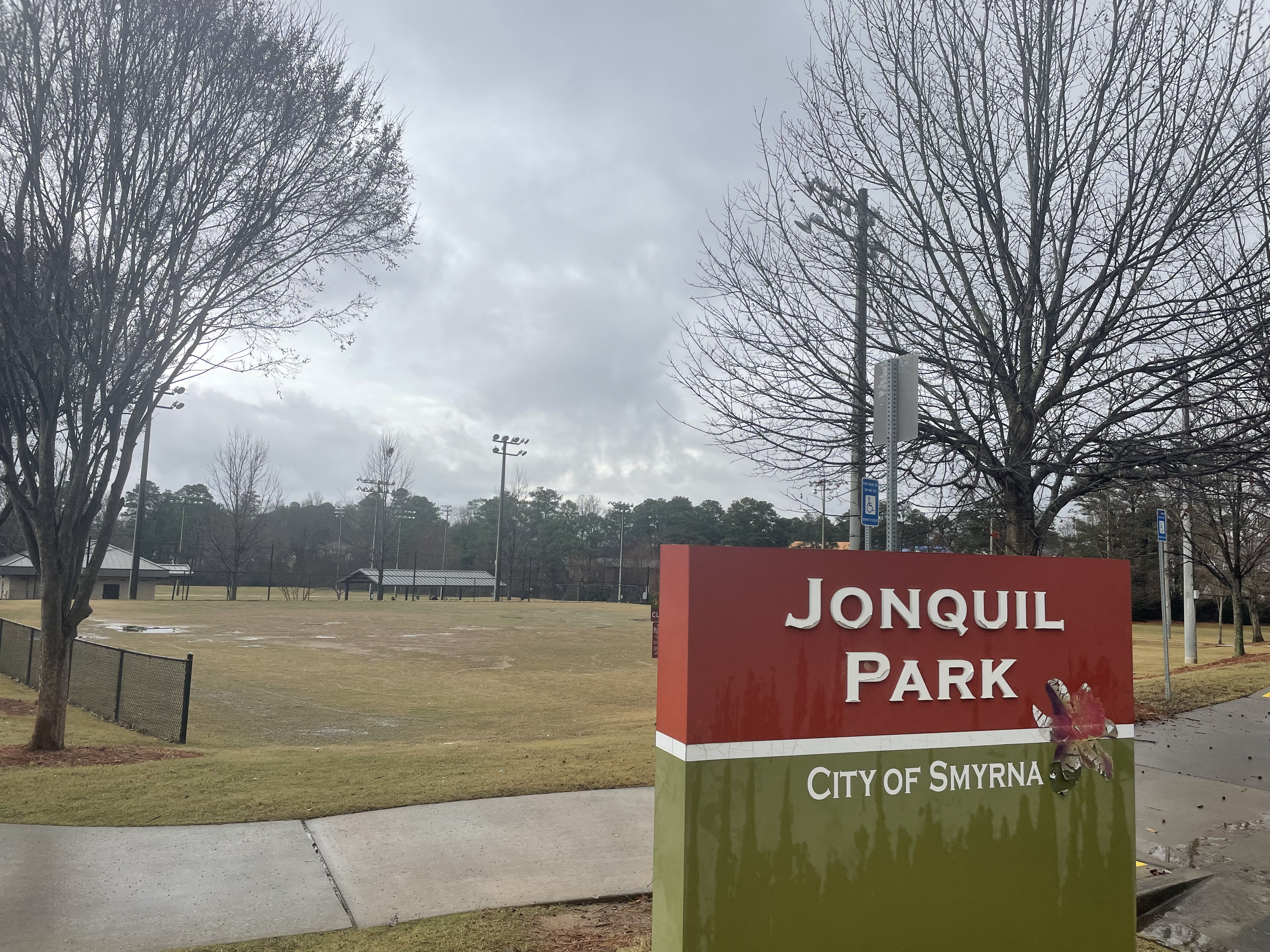
Jonquil Park

Market Village in the city center often has open-air concerts and festivals. There are also various small parks such as Cobb Park, public pools such as Aline Wolfe Center for the elderly and Tolleson park pool for all ages, tennis courts and playgrounds and a linear park with walking trail along Spring Road.

The ARTery is a community-driven public art initiative in Smyrna, located primarily in the downtown area, with key installations around Jonquil Plaza and the Village Green.

The city operates the Smyrna Public Library, the only library in the county which is not a part of the Cobb County Public Library System.

== Government ==
=== Municipal ===
The city is governed by a seven-member council, elected by wards, and a mayor elected at-large. Max Bacon served as the mayor of Smyrna starting in 1985; in July 2019 he announced his retirement from city politics. The current mayor is Derek Norton, who took office January 6, 2020. Norton previously served on the City Council since 2015. Like most municipalities in the state of Georgia, elective city offices in Smyrna are nonpartisan.

== Education ==
=== Public schools ===
Public schooling in Smyrna falls under the jurisdiction of the Cobb County School District. The city's students are served by 12 of the district's schools. The largest schools by enrollment are:

- Campbell High School
- Campbell Middle School
- Nickajack Elementary School

=== Private schools ===
Several private schools are inside Smyrna's city limits, including St. Benedict's Episcopal School, Covenant Christian School, Whitefield Academy, and a satellite campus of Buckhead Preparatory Academy.

== Media ==
Smyrna and Vinings' community newspaper is The Bright Side. It is dedicated to publishing positive events that occur in Cobb County.

The restaurant scene in the film Joyful Noise was shot at Howard's Restaurant in Smyrna in 2011.

== Infrastructure ==
=== Transportation ===
Several major roadways, such as I-285, Cobb Parkway (U.S. Route 41), Atlanta Road (Old State Route 3), and South Cobb Drive (State Route 280), pass through the municipality.

Smyrna is served by CobbLinc and MARTA public buses.

== Notable people ==
- Chan Marshall, singer-songwriter, musician, better known as Cat Power
- U.S. Representative Bob Barr
- Julia Roberts, Oscar-winning actress
- Gerald Perry and Ron Gant, baseball stars who both played for the Atlanta Braves
- Daniel Palka, baseball player with the Algodoneros de Unión Laguna of the Mexican league
- John Brebbia, baseball player with the Atlanta Braves
- Kyle Fowler, racing driver
- Louie Giglio, Passion City Church Senior Pastor/Passion Conferences and sixstepsrecords founder
- Tay Glover-Wright, American football player
- C. Martin Croker, voice-over actor and animator was born in Smyrna. He is best known for his work on the cult classic show Space Ghost Coast to Coast
- Kelly Nelon Clark, recording artist and actress, was a long time resident and calls Smyrna her hometown
- Benn Jordan, recording artist and composer, owns a home and recording studio in Smyrna.
- Eschel Rhoodie, the South African Secretary of the Department of Information from 1972 to 1977, resided in Smyrna after emigrating to the United States.
- 645AR, rapper, raised partly in Smyrna
