= Nutmegger =

Nickname

Flag of Connecticut

Nutmegger is a nickname for people from the US state of Connecticut. The official nickname for Connecticut is "The Constitution State", as voted in 1958 by the Connecticut state legislature; however, "The Nutmeg State" is an unofficial nickname for the state, hence the nickname "Nutmegger".

The origin of the appellation is unknown. One theory is that it comes from Yankee peddlers selling nutmegs in colonial times. These nutmegs may have been the real thing, i.e., the hard aromatic seed of the nutmeg tree (Myristica fragrans), an East Indies evergreen tree, or counterfeit wooden nutmegs; or, as has been suggested, they were the real thing but customers unfamiliar with the native form of the spice might have decided they had been sold a counterfeit after futilely trying to grind the unusually hard seed.

A popular newspaper column in the 1830s was "The Sayings and Doings of Samuel Slick, of Slickville", which has often been cited as the source of this legend. The original story was:

... that eternal scoundrel, that Captain John Allspice of Nahant, he used to trade to Charleston, and he carried a cargo once there of fifty barrels of nutmegs: well, he put half a bushel of good ones into each end of the barrel, and the rest he filled up with wooden ones, so like the real thing, no soul could tell the difference until HE BIT ONE WITH HIS TEETH, and that he never thought of doing, until he was first BIT HIMSELF. Well, it's been a standing joke with them southerners agin us ever since.
