= SS Havana (1891) =

1891 steamship schooner

History

Canada
- Name: SS Havana
- Owner: Farquhar, J.A. & Co.
- Operator: James A. Farquhar
- Port of registry: Windsor, NS.
- Builder: George W. Churchill
- Completed: 1891
- Fate: Sank at anchor

General characteristics
- Type: three-masted steam schooner
- Tonnage: 471 tons
- Length: 181.4 ft (55.3 m)
- Beam: 27.3 ft (8.3 m)
- Draft: 16.8 ft (5.1 m)
- Notes: Used in sealing and salvage

SS Havana was a one deck steamship schooner equipped with three masts. She was built in 1891 at Hantsport, Nova Scotia by George W. Churchill. Owned by Farquhar, J.A. & Co. and captained by James A. Farquhar, Havana sank at anchor on 26 April 1906 after colliding with SS Strathcona.

== History ==
Havana was used in both salvage and seal hunting. Original intentions for the vessel included chartering American parties looking to tour around Greenland. These expeditions were prohibited by Norwegian authorities.

In 1905, under the command of Farquhar, Havana was on a salvage mission to rescue Colonial, a cable ship that had stranded off of the coast of Canso, NS. Outfitted with a boiler, steam pumps, and wrecking apparatus, Havana successfully recovered Colonial. Colonial was harboured at the Halifax dry-dock, which was managed by S.M. Brockfield, the ship was docked and permanently repaired.

In the following winter of 1906, Havana was outfitted for seal hunting in the Gulf of Port aux Basques. By 9 April, Havana successfully returned to Halifax with a cargo of 6286 seals. From the expedition, Havana only suffered minor damage to the ship’s rudder as a result of ice flow.

Shortly after arriving in Halifax, Farquhar purchased the wrecked remains of the sunken schooner Alexander R. The wreck contained a cargo of coal that proved less than profitable.

== Sinking of the ship, and aftermath ==
Anchored in Halifax harbour on the night of 26 April 1906, the wooden Havana was struck along the broadside by SS Strathcona; a steel steamship. Sinking quickly, the crew of Havana quickly climbed aboard the deck of Strathcona. Eyewitness accounts compare the resulting damage to Havana as “if she were of matchwood.” The ship sank in approximately 10 minutes, and no casualties were suffered. The event was blamed on the results of a dark night. Havana was insured at Lloyd’s, and was valued at $11,000.

In his memoirs, Farquhar mentions that he regretted losing a sextant on board the sinking Havana. The sextant was a gift from the British Admiralty for retrieving the lost guns of HMS Niobe in 1874.

The remains of the Havana are located just off the coast of Point Pleasant Park.
