= Marietta/Cobb Museum of Art =

Coordinates: 33°57′05″N 84°32′58″W

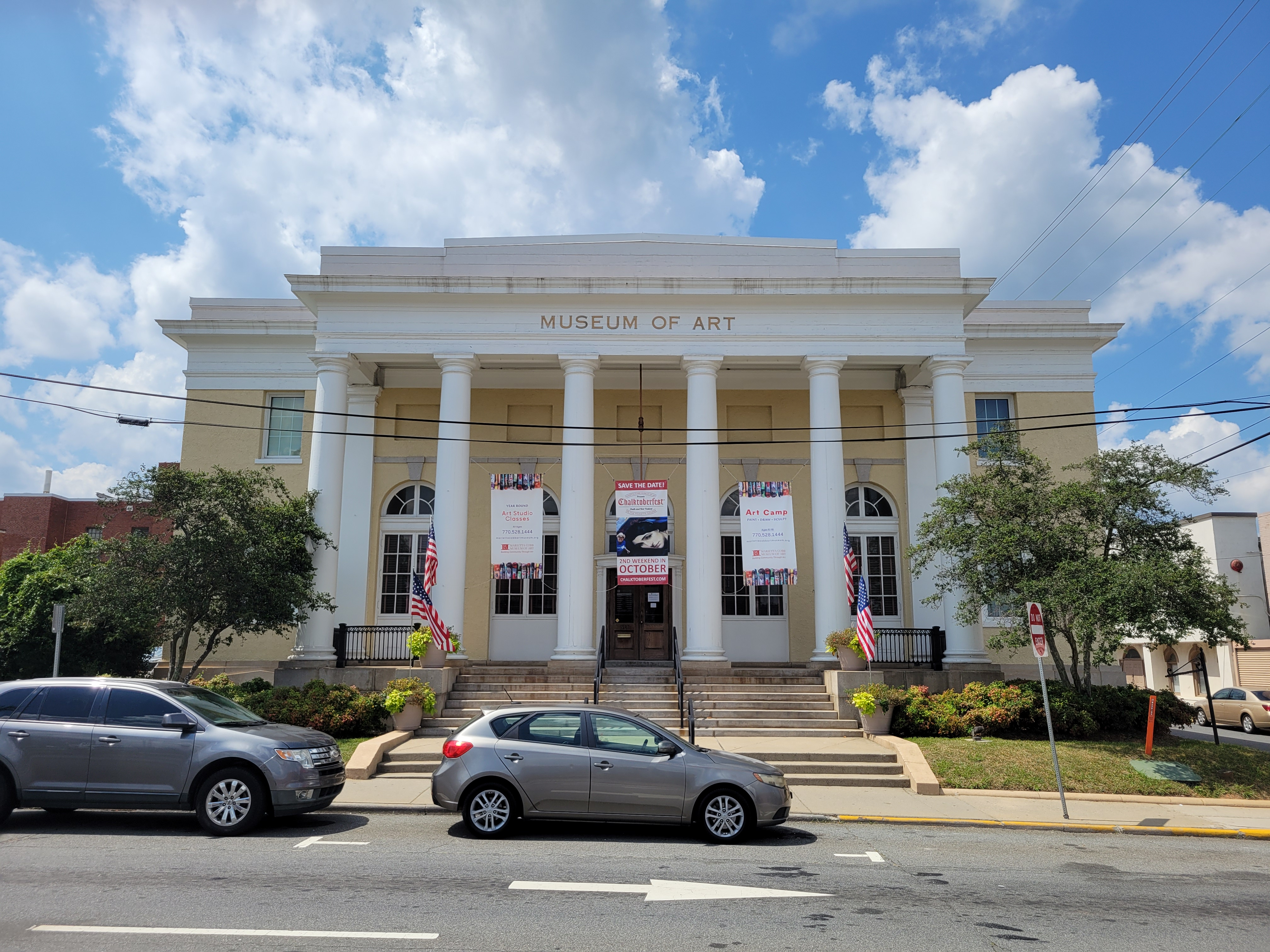
Marietta Cobb Museum of Art

The Marietta/Cobb Museum of Art is an art museum located in Marietta, the county seat of Cobb County, Georgia.

Founded in 1990, the museum's classical revival building was built in 1910 as the Marietta Post Office. In 1963 it became the main building of the Cobb County Public Library System, which has since moved into a large, modern facility.

The small museum has struggled with financial and other issues; when Donald Keyes resigned as Director in 2003, he was the ninth Director to resign in 13 years.

The building was used to film the courthouse scenes in the 2014 movie Selma.
