= Havaner lebn =

- Type: Weekly (1932–1937), Twice-weekly (1937–1960)
- Editor: Oscar Pinis (1932–1935), Sender Kaplan (1935–1960)
- Founded: November 11, 1932
- Ceased publication: December 31, 1960
- Language: Yiddish language Spanish language
- Headquarters: Havana
- Country: Cuba
- OCLC number: 8392744

Havaner lebn (Yiddish: האװאנער לעבּן, 'Havana Life'), known in Spanish as Vida Habanera, was a Yiddish and Spanish language newspaper published from Havana, Cuba 1932–1960. The first issue came out on November 11, 1932. It was the first commercial Jewish newspaper in the country with a longer duration. It was the main publication of the Ashkenazi Jewish community in the country at the time.

== History ==
Havaner lebn was founded by Elieser Aronowsky, Oscar Pinis, Carlos Shwarzapel and Asher Penn. Pinis was the editor of Havaner lebn 1932–1935. Sender Meyer Kaplan became the editor of Havaner lebn in 1935. He was assisted by Abraham J. Dubelman, who acted as co-editor of the newspaper. The authors of the newspaper were generally male. During its first years it came out weekly.

The newspaper carried advertisements for Jewish businesses. Havaner lebn published a yearly almanac, which became a key source on the history of the Jewish community in Cuba for this period.

In 1936 attacks on Havaner lebn were issued in the press organs of José Ignacio Rivero, which accused the newspaper of being leftist and anti-Cuban. As a result, Kaplan was arrested and detained for four weeks.

From 1937 onwards it was published twice-weekly. It became a bilingual (Yiddish/Spanish) publication in the 1950s.

The last issue was published on December 31, 1960. Many of the companies advertising in the newspaper had been nationalized, and would no longer pay the bills for ordered adverts. Both Kaplan and Dubelman migrated to Miami, United States shortly afterwards.
