= Soritena =

Scientific classification
- Kingdom: Animalia
- Phylum: Arthropoda
- Class: Insecta
- Order: Lepidoptera
- Superfamily: Noctuoidea
- Family: Erebidae
- Subfamily: Arctiinae
- Genus: Soritena; Schaus, 1924
- Species: S. habanera

Binomial name
- Soritena habanera Schaus, 1924

Genus of moths

Soritena is a monotypic moth genus in the family Erebidae. Its only species, Soritena habanera, is found on Cuba. Both the genus and species were first described by William Schaus in 1924.
