= Havana (juggling) =

Havana (also known as Turn Left in Havana) is a club-passing pattern for four jugglers. The pattern is a type of rotating feed, much like a feed weave. Feeders do a 2-count ("everies") while feedees do a 6-count. All passes are right hand tramline.

There is always one feeder, but the feeder changes throughout. When feeding, jugglers begin passing to feedee B and make five passes in a windshield-wiper fashion (to positions B-C-D-C-B, although the jugglers in those positions will be B-C-D-B-C).

After the first pass, feedees B and C begin to switch places in a clockwise motion. After the places have been exchanged and the feeder has given their 4th pass, B takes one additional step forward and turns counter-clockwise (left), such that D will be the new feeder.

Once A finishes their 5th pass, D immediately begins their feed cycle starting on their left. A has no break between A's 5th pass and D's first pass.

Some find that practicing a 4-person feed weave with a single feeder is a good warm up for this pattern.

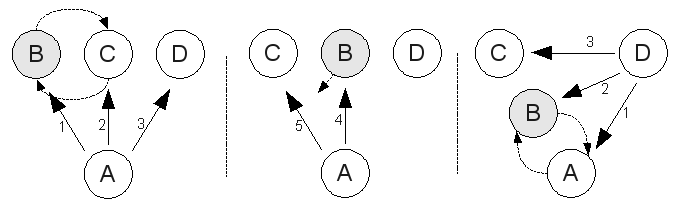

== Origin and naming ==
The "Havana" pattern was known under that name in California by 2011, and is collected in Aidan Burns' "New Highgate Collection" under the name "Havana feed" by 2014.

The pattern was recorded by The Passing Zone in 2019 under the name "Havana Feed."

In Havana, the position in the center of the triangle is "Havana," and each juggler will turn 120 degrees left after their first pass from that position; thus "turn left at Havana" is a mnemonic for that part of the pattern, and quickly came to be used as a metonym for the pattern itself.

The name of the "Albuquerque" variation refers to a running gag in Merrie Melodies cartoons in which Bugs Bunny often ends up in outlandish locations by failing to "take a left turn at Albuquerque." Versions of the gag appear in at least Herr Meets Hare (1943), Frigid Hare (1949), and Bully for Bugs (1953).

== Variations ==
- Phoenix (or Turn Right in Phoenix) is the same as Havana but the feeder starts with a pass to the rightmost feedee.
- Albuquerque (or Turn Right at Albuquerque) is the same as Havana, but mirrored, so all passes are with your left hands.
