= Havana Mena =

Havana Mena is a Latin musician born in Miami, Florida. Mena's first album was How Much You Want Me in 2000 for Heat Music. The single "How Much You Want Me" reached #11 on Billboard's top 100 rap singles. It was produced by Cool and Dre. Mena signed with Arista Records. Havana Mena was the first artist who signed to Arista Records under the direction of LA Reid.

Mena's other notable works include the single "Sleep Tight", which was featured in 2000 in the Dark Angel episode "Flushed", and the single "I'll Die for U", which was featured in the 2002 Source Youth compilation album.

Mena had gone on to complete an all-Latin/hip-hop album titled Mi Mundo produced by Nakia "Bignak" Cartwright and is currently releasing music under Soundproof Entertainment Group based out of Miami, FL.
