= Habanero (disambiguation) =

The habanero is a variety of chili pepper.

Habanero may also refer to:

- A person or thing from Havana, capital of Cuba
- Sexteto Habanero (later Septeto Habanero), a Cuban son ensemble
- El Habanero (newspaper), a Cuban newspaper
- Bōkun Habanero, a Japanese snack food company
  - Habanero-tan, the Bōkun Habanero mascot

== See also ==
- Habanera (disambiguation)
- Habano (disambiguation)
