= Habano =

The term habano (Spanish for "from Havana") most often refers to Cuban cigars. It may also refer to:

== Cigar companies ==
- Habanos S.A.

== See also ==
- Habanero (disambiguation)
- Habanera (disambiguation)
