= Skip Wells Park =

Cobb County Park

"Skip" Wells Park
- Location within Georgia Location within the United States
- Type: County Park
- Location: 2334 Bells Ferry Rd NE
- Coordinates: 34.0000°N 84.3229°W
- Area: 39.6 acres (16.0 ha)
- Operator: Cobb County PARKS
- Website: https://www.cobbcounty.gov/parks/find-park/skip-wells-park

Marine Lance Corporal Squire "Skip" Wells Park, commonly known as Skip Wells Park, is a near 40-acre park located in East Cobb, Georgia.

Formerly known as Bells Ferry Park, it was renamed in 2017 in honor of Marine Lance Corporal Squire "Skip" Wells, who was killed in the 2015 Chattanooga shootings. The park is operated by the Cobb County PARKS and includes tennis courts, softball fields, and open green space.

== History ==
Skip Wells Park was established by Cobb County as part of its efforts to expand neighborhood-level recreational access in East Cobb during the area’s period of rapid suburban growth. The park was originally known as Bells Ferry Park, likely named after Bells Ferry Road NE, which runs adjacent to the site. It is also likely that the park was developed during the 1970s, when much of East Cobb was undergoing residential expansion.

On March 12, 2017, the park was officially renamed Marine Lance Corporal Squire "Skip" Wells Park in honor of Squire "Skip" Wells, a United States Marine who was killed in the 2015 Chattanooga shootings on July 16, 2015. The attack targeted two military facilities in Chattanooga, Tennessee, and resulted in the deaths of five service members.The Federal Bureau of Investigation later classified the shooting as an act of terrorism.

Wells was 21 years old at the time of his death. He was a graduate of Lassiter High School and grew up in East Cobb, Georgia. According to his mother, Cathy Wells, he frequently played at Bells Ferry Park when he was younger. The renaming of the park recognized his military service and his personal connection to the local community.

Representative Barry Loudermilk, a member of the United States House of Representatives from Georgia, supported legislation to rename a Marietta post office in Wells’s honor. The bill was approved by Congress, and the facility was subsequently designated as the Marine Lance Corporal Squire “Skip” Wells Post Office Building.

== Facilities ==
- 1 picnic pavilion
- 2 playgrounds
- 4 tennis courts
- 4 softball fields
- 2 concession buildings
- 2 batting cages
- Walking and running trails

== Management ==
Skip Wells Park is managed by the Cobb County Parks, Recreation and Cultural Affairs Department, which is responsible for the operation, maintenance, and development of public parks and recreational facilities throughout Cobb County. The department oversees park safety, improvements, rentals, athletic programming, and community events across its parks.

Skip Wells Park is situated within a primarily residential area of East Cobb and is surrounded by established neighborhoods. Its location provides convenient access for nearby residents and shows its role as a neighborhood-level recreational facility rather than a regional destination park.

== See also ==
East Cobb, Georgia

Cobb County Parks, Recreation and Cultural Affairs Department

East Cobb Park
