= Cobb County Parks, Recreation and Cultural Affairs Department =

Cobb County local government department

Coordinates: 33.90980°N 84.58312°W

Cobb County Parks, Recreation, and Cultural Affairs Department
- Seal of the Cobb County PRC

Department overview
- Formed: 1966
- Headquarters: 1792 County Services Pkwy; Marietta, GA 30008
- Department executives: Michael Brantley, Director; Derrell Walker, Division Director, Operations; Melanie Johnson, Division Manager of Business Services; Elizabeth Hansard, Human Resources Dept. Rep.; Mario Henson, Division Director, Services
- Website: www.cobbcounty.org/parks

In the U.S. state of Georgia, the Cobb County Parks, Recreation and Cultural Affairs Department is the unit of Cobb county government which handles county parks, recreation facilities, and cultural affairs programs.

== Arts Centers ==
- Cobb County Civic Center
  - Jennie T. Anderson Theater
- Mable House
  - Barnes Amphitheater
- The Art Place
- Jim Miller Park (fairgrounds)

== Parks ==
=== Eastern district ===
- Skip Wells Park is located on Bells Ferry Road NE, south of Barrett Parkway. It has 1 picnic pavilion, 2 playgrounds, 4 tennis courts, 4 softball fields, 2 concession buildings, and 2 batting cages.
- East Cobb Park is located on Roswell Road NE (Georgia 120). East Cobb Park is the newest park in the system. The Friends of East Cobb Park started a fundraiser in 1998 to raise money to purchase the land. In 2002, construction began on the 13-acre park. It opened in 2003. East Cobb Park has 1 picnic pavilion and an amphitheater. Other amenities are included in the nearby Fullers Park.
- Fullers Park is located on Robinson Road NE, between Roswell Road NE and Old Canton Road NE, immediately south of (and almost contiguous with) East Cobb Park. It offers 2 picnic pavilions, 1 playground, 4 tennis courts, 5 baseball fields, 1 baseball/football field, 1 football/soccer field, 3 concession buildings, and batting cages. Also in Fullers Park is Fullers Recreation Center.
- Harrison Park is a large park, located in the Mountain View area on Shallowford Road NE, next to Lassiter High School. It includes 1 picnic pavilion, 3 playgrounds, 2 concession buildings, 7 baseball fields, and batting cages. Next to Harrison Park is the Harrison Tennis Center.
- Mount Bethel Park is located between Mountain View and Shallowford Falls, in the early Mount Bethel community. It is at the intersection of Lower Roswell Rd SE and Johnson Ferry Rd NE. This park has 1 baseball field, batting cages, and a concession building.
- Noonday Creek Park is located between Hawkins Store Road NE and Shallowford Road NE, along the eastern bank of Noonday Creek. There are USGS stream gauges on the creek at both ends of the park, just upstream of the Noonday Water Reclamation Facility. In this park, there are 12 soccer fields, 2 soccer practice fields, 2 football fields/soccer fields, a picnic pavilion, a playground, a BMX track, 2 concession buildings, and a meeting room.
- Sandy Plains Park is located on Sandy Plains Road NE in the Mountain View area, just east of Harrison Park. It has a playground, 4 softball fields, batting cages, and a concession building.
- Sewell Park is located on Lower Roswell Road SE, just east of Georgia 120 Loop, and west of Old Sewell Road SE. The amenities offered here are a picnic pavilion, a playground, 7 baseball fields, 2 concession buildings, 4 tennis courts, batting cages, an outdoor swimming pool, and a walking trail.
- Shaw Park is located on Canton Road NE (former Georgia 5). Gritters Library, which is part of the Cobb County Public Library System, is adjacent to the park. This park includes 5 baseball fields, batting cages, 2 tennis courts, 9 pickleball courts, a multi-purpose court, 2 picnic pavilions, 2 playgrounds, a concession building. Shaw Park also has the Northeast Cobb Community Center.
- Sweat Mountain Park is a small park located just west of Sweat Mountain on Steinhauer Road NE. It has 3 baseball fields, batting cages, 2 practice fields, 4 tennis courts, a playground, a picnic pavilion, a concession building, and a dog park.
- Terrell Mill Park is located on Terrell Mill Road SE at Paper Mill Road SE. Terrell Mill Park has 2 picnic pavilions, a playground, 4 softball fields, a concession building, and a soccer field. It also has the Terrell Mill Tennis Center.

=== Central district ===
- Fair Oaks Park is in the area of Cobb County called Fair Oaks. It is a large park that has 2 baseball fields, 2 soccer fields, a softball/football field, a multi-purpose court, 1 playground, 3 picnic pavilions, 2 concession buildings, and a sand volleyball court. Fair Oaks Park is also home to the Fair Oaks Tennis Center and the Fair Oaks Recreation Center.
- Heritage Park is right off of Fontaine Road SE. It has hiking trails (not paved), a boardwalk, an outdoor education building, 2 picnic pavilions, a historic cemetery, and a mill building.
- Hurt Road Park is beside the intersection of Hicks Road SW and Hurt Road SW. It consists of 4 softball fields, batting cages, 1 picnic pavilion, 2 concession buildings., 4 tennis courts, a basketball court, a walking trail, and 1 playground.
- "Jim Miller Park"
- Lions Park is close to Veterans Memorial Hwy SW. In this park, there are 2 baseball fields, batting cages, and 2 Concession buildings. The South Cobb Community Center is also located at this park.
- Milford Park is at the intersection of Smyrna Powder Springs Road SW and Hicks Road SW. It has 3 baseball fields, batting cages, 1 football field, a concession building, and 4 playgrounds.
- Nickajack Park is built along Nickajack Creek. This creek divides it from the neighboring school Lindley 6th Grade Academy. Nickajack Park offers 1 softball field, 1 baseball field, 1 football/softball field, a multi-purpose court, 4 tennis courts, batting cage, a playground, 2 picnic pavilions, and a concession building.
- Rhyne Park borders King Springs Road SE. It houses 2 playgrounds, 3 picnic pavilions, a concession building, 2 softball fields, 4 tennis courts, and some batting cages.
- Thompson Park is close to Heritage Park. Thompson park is basically a wooded area with a lake. It also includes the Thompson Community Center.
- Wallace Park is a very large park located in Mableton, GA. It has 2 picnic pavilions, 1 playground, 4 tennis courts, 1 softball field, 2 concession buildings, 2 batting cages, 2 baseball fields, 1 football field, and multi-purpose courts.

=== Western district ===
- Big Shanty Park is located next to Kennesaw Mountain High School. It has 4 baseball fields, 2 soccer fields, 4 tennis courts, and a concessions stand with a pressbox.
- Kennworth Park is a very large park that has 5 softball fields, 1 picnic pavilion, 2 concession buildings, batting cages, a senior center, and a playground. It is also adjacent to the Kennworth Tennis Center (8 courts).
- Lost Mountain Park is a very large park off of Dallas Highway (SR 120) that contains 8 softball fields, 1 baseball field, 2 football/soccer fields, a recreation center, 3 concession buildings, 2 playgrounds, 3 picnic pavilions, batting cages, walking tracks, 2 fishing ponds, and the West Cobb Senior Center. The Lost Mountain Tennis Center (12 courts) is also a part of Lost Mountain Park.
- Mudcreek Soccer Complex is a small park that offers youth soccer programs. It has 3 full-size and 2 half-size soccer fields, a concession/restroom building, a playground, a half-mile concrete walking track.
- Clarkdale Park is a small park that offers 2 softball fields, 2 baseball fields, and a concessions building.
- Oregon Park contains 8 baseball fields, 3 picnic pavilions, a playground, a disc golf course, 4 tennis courts, batting cages, a walking trail, and a concessions building.
- Pitner Road Park
- Powder Springs Park
- Stout Park
- Sweetwater Park
- Tramore Park
- Wild Horse Creek Park

=== Future parks ===
==== Hyde Farm ====
Hyde Farm is a future park, located adjacent to the Johnson Ferry unit of the Chattahoochee River National Recreation Area. It will be purchased from the land trust which bought the farm, and will be paid-for and operated jointly by the county and the National Park Service. The farmstead and home will continue to operate as a working farm.

==== Other purchases ====
In 1992, TPL bought an initial 40 acres (160,000 m^{2}) of the property along the Chattahoochee River, which were added to the Chattahoochee River National Recreation Area. That deal also ensured J.C. Hyde the right to farm that land along the river for the rest of his life, and TPL was granted the right to buy the upland acreage if the farm was to be sold within the next twenty years. After J.C. Hyde's death in 2004, his heirs sued, seeking to end TPL's contractual right of first offer. But the U.S. District Court for the Northern District of Georgia upheld the agreement. TPL and the estate recently settled the suit, allowing TPL to buy the remaining 95 acres (380,000 m^{2}) for $14,195,000. Cobb County Government and the Cobb County School Board are two different entities or agencies. Both collect their own tax base from the residents in the county.

== Recreation centers ==
=== Swimming pools ===
Indoor, year-round:

- Central Aquatic Center (next to the Cobb C ivic Center)
- Mountain View Aquatic Center
- West Cobb Aquatic Center
- South Cobb Aquatic Center

Outdoor, summer-only:

- Seven Springs Water Park
- Sewell Park Pool

=== Tennis ===
CCPRCA offers 6 complete tennis facilities. There are a total of 122 tennis courts at Cobb County parks and recreation centers.

- Fair Oaks Tennis Center was Cobb's first tennis center. It has 12 hard-courts and a tennis pro-shop building.
- Harrison Tennis Center is Cobb's largest tennis facility. It offers 16 hard-courts, 6 mini-courts, and a pro-shop building.
- Kennworth Tennis Center has 8 hard courts and a pro-shop building.
- Lost Mountain Tennis Center is Cobb's newest tennis center. It offers 12-hard courts and a pro-shop building.
- Sweetwater Tennis Center has 8 hard-courts.
- Terrell Mill Tennis Center has 8 hard-courts and a pro-shop building.

Other tennis courts without services are located at several other county parks.

=== Trails ===
- Silver Comet Trail
- Noonday Creek Trail (proposed)
- other proposed walking trails

=== Others ===
- Cobb Gymnastics Center
- Al Bishop Softball Complex
- Thompson Park offers therapeutic recreation
