= Fullers Park =

Park in Cobb County, Georgia, United States

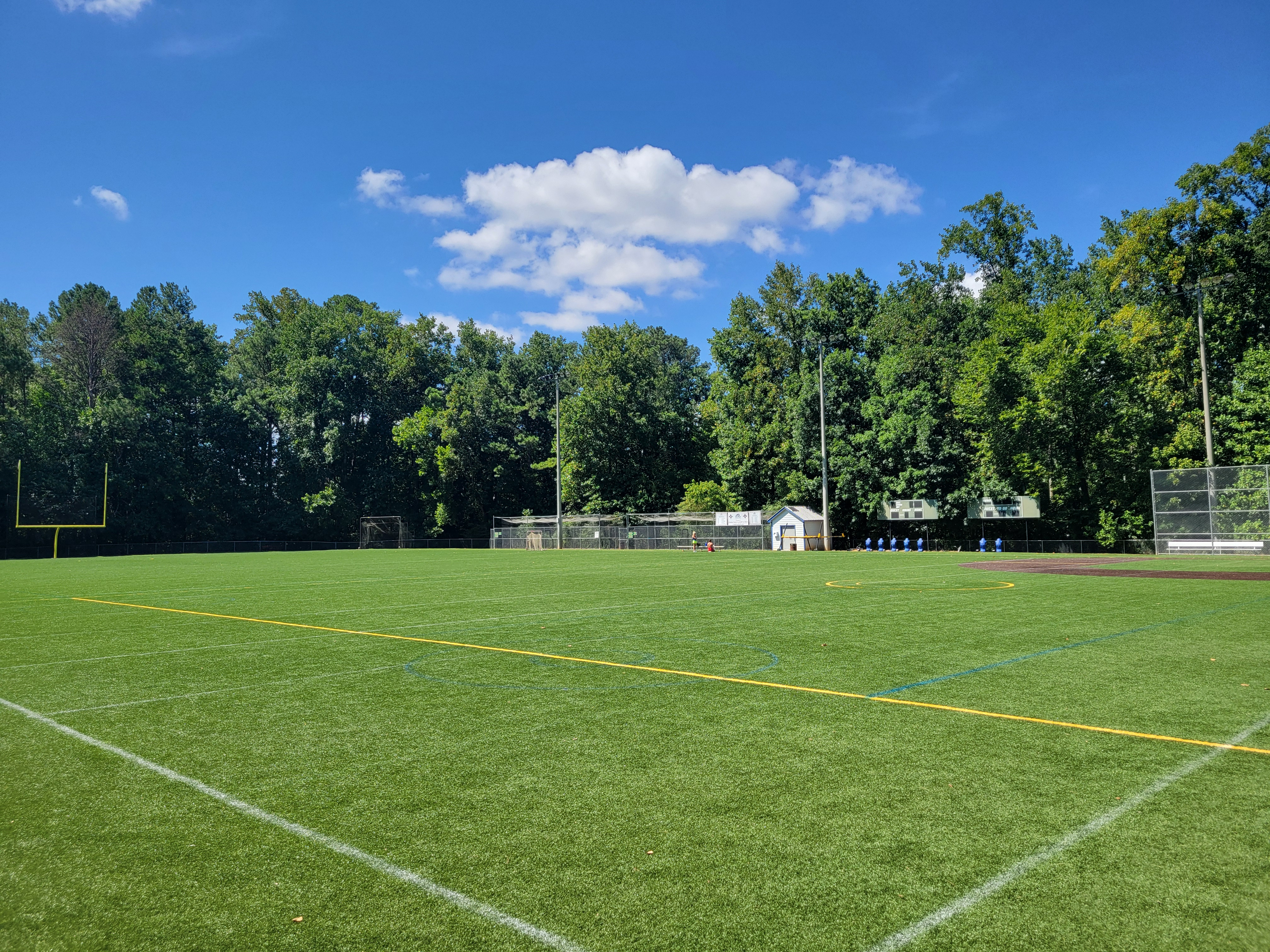

- Location within Georgia Location within the United States
- Type: County Park
- Location: 3499 Robinson Rd NE
- Coordinates: 33.97289°N 84.45254°W
- Area: 50 acres (20 ha)
- Established: 1974
- Operator: Cobb County
- Hiking trails: Fullers Park Trail
- Website: https://www.cobbcounty.gov/fullers-park

Fullers Park is a 50-acre county park located in East Cobb, Georgia. The park was originally developed by Cobb County and completed in 1974 as part of the county's expansion of public recreational facilities. The park has athletic fields, walking paths, playgrounds, picnic pavilions, and the Fullers Recreation Center. The Sewell Mill Creek runs through it.

== History ==
In the 1960s, Cobb County began an effort to expand its public recreation facilities during the years of rapid suburban expansion. The land that would become Fullers Park was purchased by Cobb County in April 1967. After seven years, the park was fully developed and ready for public use. It opened in June 1974.

Since opening, Fullers Park has undergone several renovations. A multi-use artificial turf field was installed. One of the baseball fields at the park was renamed in honor of Braves Hall-of-Famer, Chipper Jones, following a renovation project supported by the Atlanta Braves Foundation. The Fullers Park Recreation Center, an indoor community facility, provides space for recreational programming and community event space.

== East Cobb Park Connection ==
Fullers Park is connected by walking trails and a bridge over the Sewell Mill Creek to East Cobb Park, a 50-arce recreational park. Fullers Park is an active park, meaning it features facilities that can be used for recreational team sports. East Cobb Park is a passive park, which means it has a green space and calmer atmosphere.

== See also ==
- East Cobb Park
- Sewell Mill Creek
- Cobb County Parks, Recreation and Cultural Affairs Department
