= Charlice Byrd =

American politician

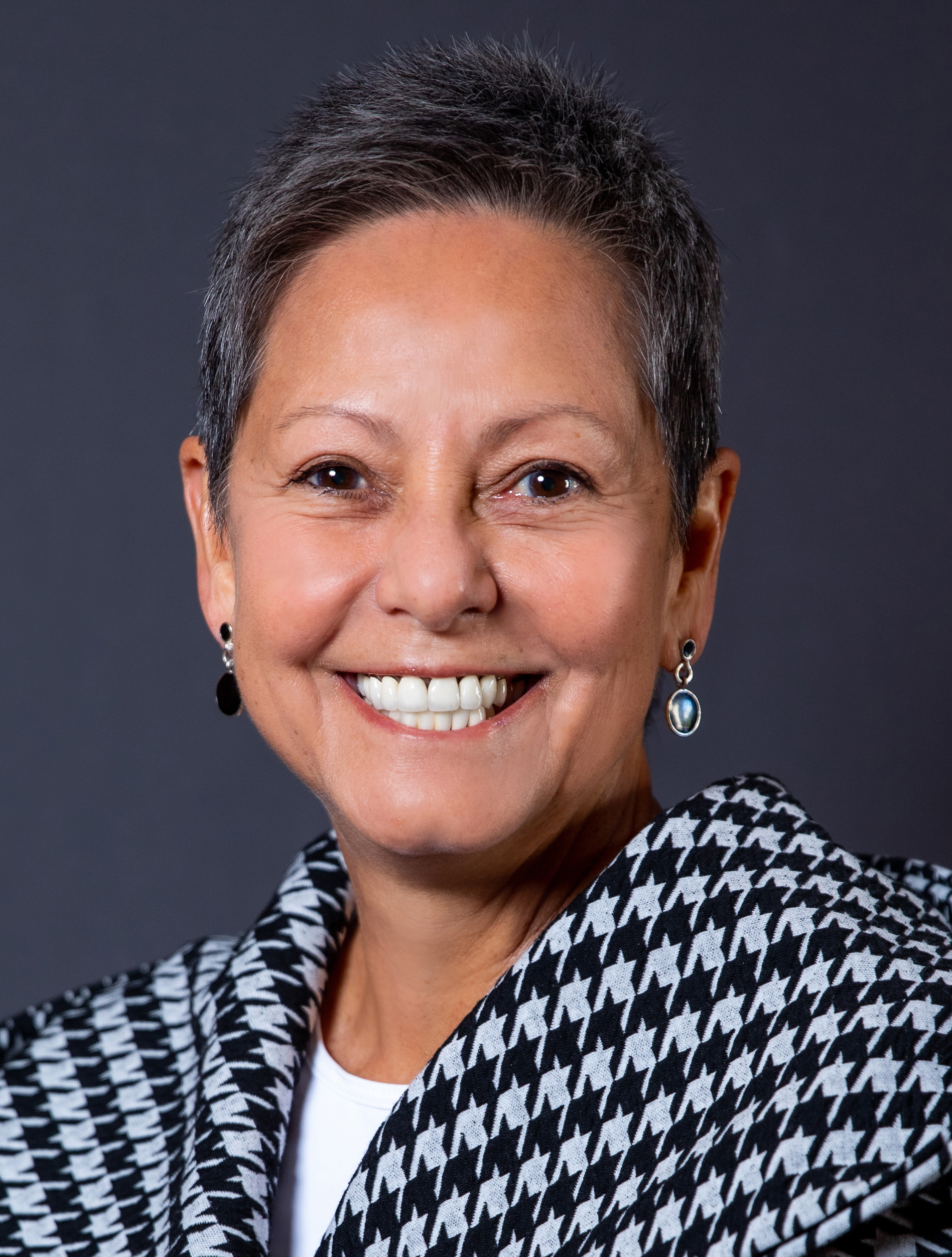
- Official portrait, 2025

Member of the Georgia House of Representatives from the 20th district
- Incumbent
- Assumed office January 11, 2021
- In office January 10, 2005 – January 14, 2013
- Preceded by: Chip Rogers
- Succeeded by: Michael Caldwell

Personal details
- Born: September 14, 1951 (age 74) New Orleans, Louisiana, U.S.
- Party: Republican
- Spouse: Michael Byrd
- Education: Southeastern Louisiana University
- Occupation: Educator
- Website: Official site

Charlice Hew Byrd (born September 14, 1951) is a Republican member of the Georgia House of Representatives who serves District 20 and parts of Cherokee County. She is a member of the Georgia Freedom Caucus.

An elementary educator from New Orleans, Louisiana, she and her husband, Michael reside in Woodstock, Georgia and are members of First Baptist Woodstock.

She graduated from Southeastern Louisiana University.

Byrd is of Chinese descent.
