= Chip Rogers =

American politician (born 1968)

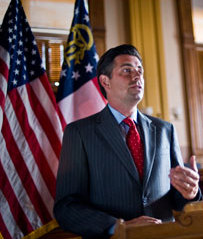
- Rogers in 2010

Member of the Georgia Senate from the 21st district
- In office 2003–2012
- Preceded by: Robert Lamutt
- Succeeded by: Brandon Beach

Personal details
- Born: May 3, 1968 (age 58)
- Party: Republican
- Education: Georgia Institute of Technology; J. Mack Robinson College of Business at Georgia State University

William "Chip" Rogers (born May 3, 1968) is the former president and CEO of the American Hotel & Lodging Association and past president and CEO of the Asian American Hotel Owners Association (AAHOA). Rogers is a former American politician from the state of Georgia. He is a Republican and was first elected in 2002 to the Georgia House of Representatives. In 2004 he was elected to the Georgia State Senate. Rogers was elected Senate Majority Leader in 2008 and again in 2010. In November 2012, Rogers resigned his position as Senate Majority Leader, and in December, he resigned his position in the state Senate. He took up the position of host and executive producer of the statewide Georgia Public Broadcasting radio program Georgia Works. After being fired from that position, he became the president of AAHOA.

== Biography ==
=== Education ===
Rogers graduated from North Gwinnett High School in 1986 and from the Georgia Institute of Technology with a Bachelor of Science Degree and a certificate in Economics in 1991. He then attended the Georgia State University's J. Mack Robinson College of Business, graduating with an MBA.

=== Career before politics ===
Chip Rogers founded Rogers Broadcasting in the early 1990s, which later became Rogers Communications. The company held interests in a radio station and real estate. During the 1990s, Rogers worked for a number of metro Atlanta radio stations including as an anchor for WBHF.

Rogers purchased the radio station WYXC, located in the Atlanta suburb of Cartersville, in 1999. He owned and operated the radio station for six years, selling WYXC to Clarion Communications in 2005. Rogers acquired sole ownership of Clarion Communications in December 2012 and immediately entered into a lease management agreement with Newstalk corporation to operate WYXC.

Before entering politics, Rogers appeared in infomercials for a sports handicapping service, portraying “Will 'The Winner' Rogers”. They promoted a "pay-per-call number" to receive football predictions. Rogers said the media stories on the topic were "gutter politics", that the work was scripted, and that he was not a sports handicapper. Rogers was also involved in a civil suit and counter suit with Bartow County Bank over a loan on the Oglethorpe Inn, after Rogers and his partner sold the hotel, but remained as guarantors for the loan. The matter was settled out of court.

=== Fred Thompson campaign ===
In September 2007, Senator Rogers was chosen as Executive Director and Communications Director for the Fred Thompson for U.S. President campaign in Georgia. A November 2007 poll among Republican primary voters in Georgia showed Thompson with a large lead over his G.O.P. primary candidates. Rogers secured endorsements for Thompson from 58 fellow Republican legislators, more than all other G.O.P. candidates at the time.

== Georgia House of Representatives (2003–2005) ==
Rogers first ran for office in 2002, winning a majority of the votes in a four-person primary for an open seat in the Georgia House of Representatives. The District 20 seat represented the citizens in the southwest corner of Cherokee County that encompasses Woodstock, Towne Lake, and parts of Acworth.

== Georgia Senate ==
After two years in the State House, Rogers ran to replace State Senator Robert Lamutt in District 21, who had decided to run for an open Congressional seat vacated by then Congressman Johnny Isakson. Rogers routed the early front runner and lawyer Craig Dowdy in the Republican primary, taking 81% of the vote. During one of Rogers' campaigns for the legislature, two teenage campaign workers stole signs of his opponent. Rogers stated he supported the plan after he alleged dozens of his own signs had been stolen, but added he had told his campaign manager not to proceed with any such plan.

Rogers was a leading voice for education reform and school choice. He was the Senate sponsor of the Constitutional Amendment to create public charter schools. The Constitutional Amendment Rogers sponsored was approved by Georgia voters on November 6, 2012.

Senator Rogers authored the Grade Integrity Act aimed at protecting the classroom teacher's authority to give students the grade they actually earned. The law prevents school personnel from changing a grade given by the classroom teacher unless such grade was given in conflict with school policy.

Rogers also helped make Georgia a national leader in K-12 digital learning. He authored the Digital Learning Act and was the Senate sponsor of the Online Clearinghouse Act. Both measures, which were signed into law, are aimed at expanding digital learning options and offerings for Georgia students.

Rogers helped pass legislation aimed at preventing identity theft. He authored the Georgia Personal Identity Protection Act which requires government agencies to provide notice to their customers upon a breach of a security system and a loss of electronic data including personal information. Rogers also authored the Georgia Credit Protection Act which would allow Georgia residents the opportunity to freeze their personal credit in order to prevent identity theft.

Senator Rogers was the author of Mattie's Call Act, a law which uses the Georgia statewide emergency alert system to help locate missing person's suffering from Alzheimer's disease or dementia.

In 2011 and 2012, Rogers committed to not accepting any lobbyist gifts. After receiving gifts and donations of $10,771 from lobbyists he indicated that he returned all gifts stating, "I spent considerable amounts of money paying people for things I never asked for" and that he wanted a "zero" on his lobbyist balance sheet."

=== Georgia Senate Majority Leader (2008–2012) ===
In November 2008, Senator Rogers was unanimously elected Senate Majority Leader for the Republican Party. He was unanimously re-elected in November 2010.

In 2010 Rogers authored a comprehensive overhaul of the Georgia Property Tax Code. The two laws authored by Rogers, SB 240 and SB 346 allowed for alternative property tax appeals, prevented local governments from ignoring distressed sales when establishing property values, and required that property sales price establishes initial assessed value. For his efforts in helping property owners, Rogers was honored as the "Legislator of the Year" by the Georgia Property Taxpayer Association.

Rogers also earned the 2010 "Golden Shovel" Award from the Georgia Utility Contractors (GUCA). In a statement from the association, "(Rogers) played an integral role in passing favorable legislation for GUCA in the 2010 Legislative Session, including SB 339, GUCA's legislation that allows utility contractors to directly bid on utility construction work ... and specifically helped carry legislation to help reduce the property tax burden for heavy equipment operators." In 2011 he announced support for Tea Party advocates looking to expand school choice in the state.

In October 2012, Rogers held an educational meeting about Agenda 21 for Senators and staffers, at the request of constituents, to discuss "how regionalism and public private partnerships are tearing down constitutionally limited self-government and free market economics." A resolution denouncing Agenda 21 as a threat to private property rights was part of the 2012 Republican National Platform.

May 2012: Decades-old videos surface that show Rogers, billed as Will “The Winner” Rogers, urging viewers to call a 900-number to get picks to gamble on sporting events.

== Georgia Public Broadcasting ==
On December 4, Rogers announced he was stepping down from the Senate to take an executive position with Georgia Public Broadcasting. Rogers joined Georgia Public Broadcasting as Executive Director for Georgia Works in December 2012. The Georgia Works blog, written by Rogers, was the most visited such blog on the GPB website, based upon the thirty minute long weekly television program of the same name that covered economic development and employment trends. Rogers worked on the program as Executive Producer and host. The multi-faceted Georgia Works platform included a statewide radio program heard across the 17-station GPB Radio network. Georgia Works programming focused on economic development in Georgia, along with educational, training, and employment opportunities. The program was broadcast statewide and was also broadcast on the GPB website.

Rogers was fired by Georgia Public Broadcasting in 2014 for violations of employment policy including political activity, outside or dual employment, and their code of ethics.

== Asian American Hotel Owners Association ==
Having worked with the organization since 2010, including as its VP, government affairs and public relations, in 2015 Rogers became the president and CEO of the Asian American Hotel Owners Association (AAHOA), the largest hotel owners association in the United States., after serving as interim president since November 2014. Rogers stated that the organization’s members own about half of all hotels in the United States. In leading the organization, he advocated for non-profit groups to clearly define their goals in order to increase their efficiency. In his role with AAHOA, Rogers also served as a member of the Forbes Nonprofit Council, the California State University Hospitality & Tourism Management Education Alliance Advisory Panel, Board member of the American Legislative Exchange Council Private Enterprise Advisory Board, and the board of directors for Community Leaders of America.

== Awards and recognitions ==
- The International Hospitality Institute recognized and featured him as one of the 100 Most Powerful People in Global Hospitality.
- The Atlanta Business Chronicle named Rogers as one of the 50 professionals in its 2018 Who's Who in Metro Atlanta's Hospitality Scene.
- Rogers has been recognized as a national leader for education reform by the Foundation for Excellence in Education and Students First.
- He is also a multiple winner of the Golden Peach Award given for support of digital learning in Georgia Public Schools
- Senator Rogers was a leader for property tax reform and was recognized by the Georgia Property Taxpayer Association as "Legislator of the Year"
- Rogers was named to "Most Influential Georgians" by James Magazine
- Senator Rogers named "Senator of the Year" four times by the Georgia Retail Association

== Electoral history ==
Georgia House of Representative Primary Election, 2002
| Party | Candidate | Votes | % | ±% |
|---|---|---|---|---|
| Republican | Chip Rogers | 3,447 | 53.70 | |
| Republican | Larry Singleton | 1,342 | 20.90 | |
| Republican | Dawn Marr | 1,181 | 18.40 | |
| Republican | Jerry Lanham | 451 | 7.00 | |

Georgia House of Representative General Election, 2002
| Party | Candidate | Votes | % | ±% |
|---|---|---|---|---|
| Republican | Chip Rogers | 10,034 | 81.20 | |
| Democratic | Jerry Moore | 2,318 | 18.80 | |

Georgia State Senate Primary Election, 2004
| Party | Candidate | Votes | % | ±% |
|---|---|---|---|---|
| Republican | Chip Rogers | 15,818 | 81.40 | |
| Republican | Craig Dowdy | 3,625 | 18.60 | |

Georgia State Senate General Election, 2004
| Party | Candidate | Votes | % | ±% |
|---|---|---|---|---|
| Republican | Chip Rogers | 61,810 | 100.00 | |
| Democratic | None | 0 | 0.0 | |

Georgia State Senate General Election, 2006
| Party | Candidate | Votes | % | ±% |
|---|---|---|---|---|
| Republican | Chip Rogers | 40,417 | 100.00 | |
| Democratic | None | 0 | 0.0 | |

Georgia State Senate General Election, 2008
| Party | Candidate | Votes | % | ±% |
|---|---|---|---|---|
| Republican | Chip Rogers | 61,991 | 76.70 | |
| Democratic | Carlos Lopez | 18,776 | 23.20 | |

Georgia State Senate General Election, 2010
| Party | Candidate | Votes | % | ±% |
|---|---|---|---|---|
| Republican | Chip Rogers | 46,102 | 80.00 | |
| Democratic | Patrick Thompson | 11,514 | 20.00 | |

Georgia State Senate General Election, 2012
| Party | Candidate | Votes | % | ±% |
|---|---|---|---|---|
| Republican | Chip Rogers | 66,429 | 100.00 | |
| Democratic | None | 0 | 0.0 | |

== See also ==
| Preceded by Tommy Williams | Georgia Senate Majority Leader; 2009–2012 | Succeeded by Ronnie Chance |
