= Noonday Creek Structure Number 4 =

Earth dam in Georgia, US

Coordinates: 34°03′42″N 84°32′42″W

Noonday Creek Structure Number 4 is an earthen dam on Noonday Creek regulated by the Georgia Safe Dams Program, located west of Noonday Creek Park. Construction was completed in 1954.

== Dimensions ==
The dam is 34 feet (10 m) high, and 765 feet (233 m) long. The maximum discharge is 2600 cubic feet per second.
