= Noonday Creek Structure Number 16 =

Coordinates: 34°01′48″N 84°33′54″W

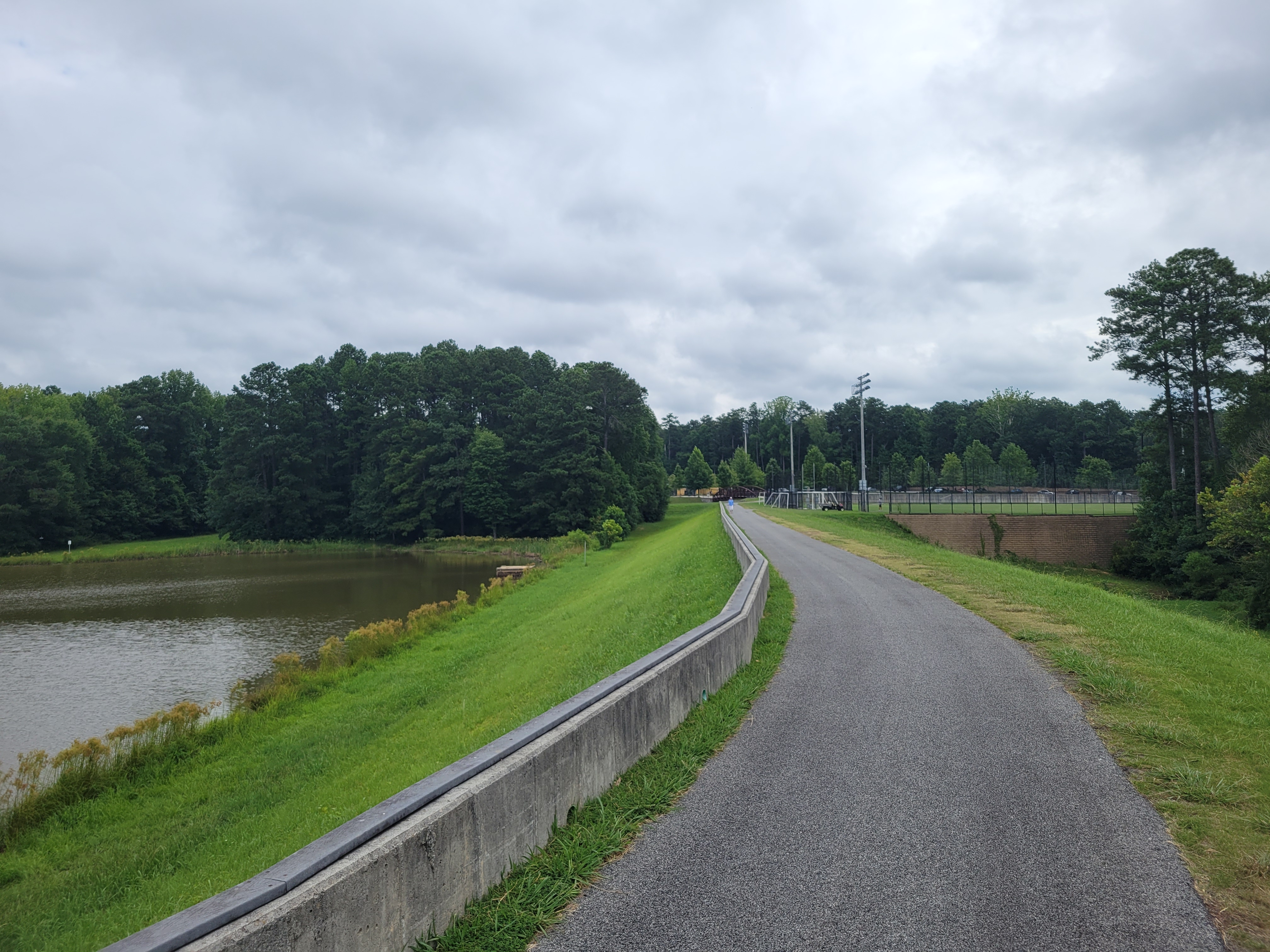
KSU Walking Path along dam

Noonday Creek Structure Number 16 is a category 1 (high hazard) earthen dam on Noonday Creek regulated by the Georgia Safe Dams Program, located a few yards north of Big Shanty Road in Kennesaw, GA. Construction was completed in 1956.

== Dimensions ==
The dam is 32 feet (9.8 m) high, and 912 feet (278 m) long. The maximum discharge is 2,050 cubic feet per second (58 m^{3}/s).
