= Georgia's 20th House of Representatives district =

State district in Georgia, USA

Georgia's 20th State House of Representatives district
Representative
Charlice Byrd; R–Woodstock
- Demographics: 79.8% White; 8.0% Black; 7.6% Hispanic; 2.6% Asian
- Population: 57,200

District 20 elects one member of the Georgia House of Representatives. It contains parts of Cherokee County.

== Members ==
- Chip Rogers (2003–2005)
- Charlice Byrd (2005–2013)
- Michael Caldwell (2013–2021)
- Charlice Byrd (since 2021)
