= India Tribune =

Chicago-based weekly newspaper

- Editor: Prashant Shah
- Founded: 1977
- City: Chicago
- Country: United States
- OCLC number: 40476249

India Tribune is a Chicago-based weekly in newspaper format, covering community affairs of the Americans from Indian descent, as well as news from India. The publication was founded in 1977.

The India Tribune is currently published in three editions: Chicago, New York City and Atlanta. It also runs a website with up-to-date news, features and photographs. Prashant Shah has been the editor and publisher of India Tribune since its onset.

== Associations ==
India Tribune is officially endorsed and honored by the following organizations:

- American Association of Physicians of Indian Origin (AAPI)
- Asian American Hotel Owners Association (AAHOA)
- National Federation of Indian Associations (NFIA)

== India Tribune columnists ==
Following are writers who have worked as columnists in India Tribune:

- Thomas Kulanjiyil (family matters)
- Dr. C. L. Shastri (astrology)
- Lina Trivedi (social issues)

== Today ==
Beginning May 2012, India Tribune changed its publishing frequency from weekly to bi-weekly. The bi-weekly version of India Tribune contains more pages and content and is printed on a glossier style of paper.

== Editor in chief ==
Shah has been running India Tribune for over 30 years. He immigrated to the United States in 1971 to study chemical engineering at Indiana Institute of Technology in Fort Wayne, Indiana. He later moved to Chicago, and started publishing India Tribune in 1977.
