= East Cobb Park =

Cobb County Park

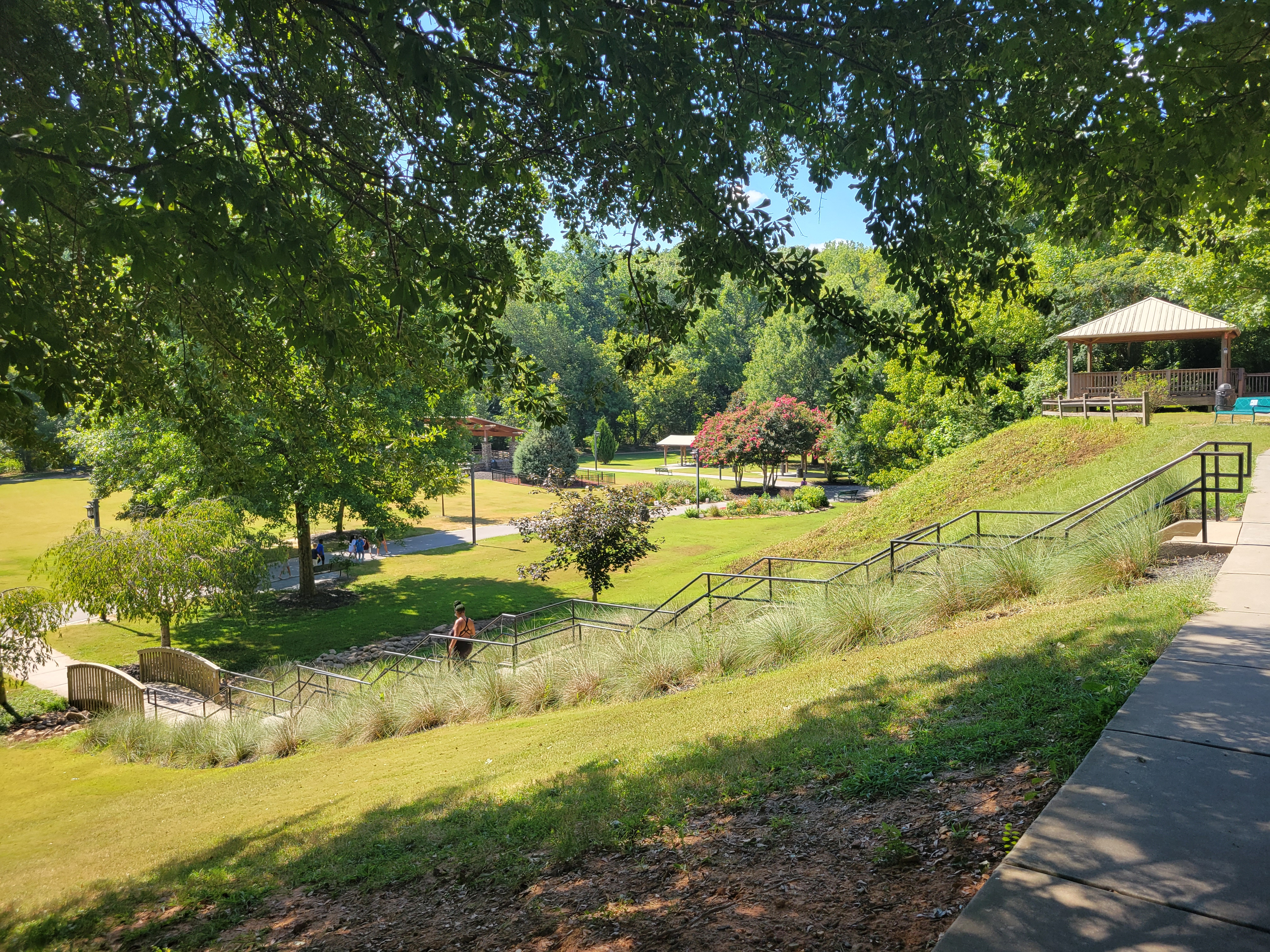
- East Cobb Park stairway

- Location within Georgia Location within the United States
- Type: County Park
- Location: 3322 Roswell Rd NE
- Coordinates: 33.9786°N 84.4442°W
- Area: 20 acres (8.1 ha)
- Established: 2003
- Operator: Cobb County & Friends for the East Cobb Park
- Hiking trails: East Cobb Loop (.9 mi)
- Website: https://eastcobbpark.org/

East Cobb Park is a near 50-acre county park located in East Cobb, Georgia.

It was originally established during the summer of 2003 by the Friends for the East Cobb Park. Today, the park features walking trails, bi-level playgrounds, open grass fields, pavilions, an outdoor classroom, and a view of the Sewell Mill Creek.

== History ==
In 1832, Georgia Conducted the Gold Lottery which gave 40-acre parcels to people willing to settle in these areas. The Tritt family received the land lots 965 and 966 with the Sewell Mill Creek running through. By 1965, land west of the Sewell Mill Creek had all been sold. Some of this land was sold to the Bowles family.

Creating a park in the quickly suburbanizing East Cobb was only an idea in 1998. With help from the East Cobb Area Council of the Cobb Chamber of Commerce, the Friends for the East Cobb Park non-profit was established. Several people were involved in the founding of this organization including Mary Karras, the first president of the Friends for the East Cobb Park, and Sunny Walker, who really sparked the vision for this park. Friends for the East Cobb Park helped to fundraise buying a 13 acre plot of land along SR-120 (Roswell Rd NE) to deed to Cobb County to create this park.

The goal was to fundraise $1 Million. Local schools, families, Scouting troops, and local organizations all brought money toward this fundraiser. At the park, stone walkways are filled with names of those who had donated, park benches feature memorial plaques, and the fence surrounding the park contains names of people, families, and organizations who had also donated. With all of the help from the East Cobb community, near closing time, Friends for the East Cobb Park were about $100,000 short at closing. Riverside Bank came in with a vital loan to ensure that the deal wouldn't collapse; the loan would eventually be paid off.

After original fundraising was complete, the Friends for the East Cobb Park kept their promise and followed through by deeding 13 acres of land to Cobb County. This was a major milestone because it officially turned private land into a public park. The county then took over the responsibility for the construction costs and daily maintenance. Construction of the park began in 2002, and a Dedication Ceremony was held on 28 June 2003. Mrs. Wylene Tritt, previous owner of the land East Cobb Park is on spoke about the land and her family's heritage to East Cobb. She talked about how special it was for this piece of her property to be enjoyed by the community.

In 2018, Mrs. Wylene Tritt sold 22 acres of the about 54 acre Tritt property to Cobb County to 'preserve the green jewel of East Cobb' for the public to enjoy instead of private development. She then donated about 7.7 acres of flood-plain land (Which wouldn't have been able to be developed) along the Sewell Mill Creek as a nice gesture to complete the deal.Today this land sits alongside East Cobb Park undeveloped.

== Facilities ==
- Multiple Walking Trails
- 2 Playgrounds
- 5 Pavilions
- East Cobb Park Garden & Nature Club Meetings
- Music in the Park Events
- Movie Nights Events
- Lending Book Library
- Sewell Mill Creek Overlooks
- Connecting Paths to Fullers Park

== Management ==
Since the park is a partnership between Cobb County and Friends for the East Cobb Park, there is a public-private partnership between the two. The county is responsible for the basic operations, infrastructure (Parking lots, restrooms, and repairs), and public safety. However, the Friends for the East Cobb Park fundraise and program events for the park. The non-profit helps to raise money for new additions and to host major annual programs like the Holiday lights and Sunday Music in the Park.

== Fullers Park Connection ==
East Cobb Park is connected by walking trails and a bridge over the Sewell Mill Creek to Fullers Park, a 50 acre recreational park. East Cobb Park is a passive park, which means it has a green space and chill atmosphere. Unlike East Cobb Park, Fullers Park is an active park featuring a gymnasium, tennis courts, a soccer field, many baseball/softball fields.

== See also ==
Fullers Park

Sewell Mill Creek

Cobb County Parks, Recreation and Cultural Affairs Department
