= Noonday Creek =

Stream in Georgia, United States

Noonday Creek is a 20.2-mile-long (32.5 km) stream in Cobb and Cherokee counties in the U.S. state of Georgia. The stream begins near Kennesaw Mountain and ends at Lake Allatoona.

Noonday is a translation of the native Cherokee language name, referring to the solar noon.

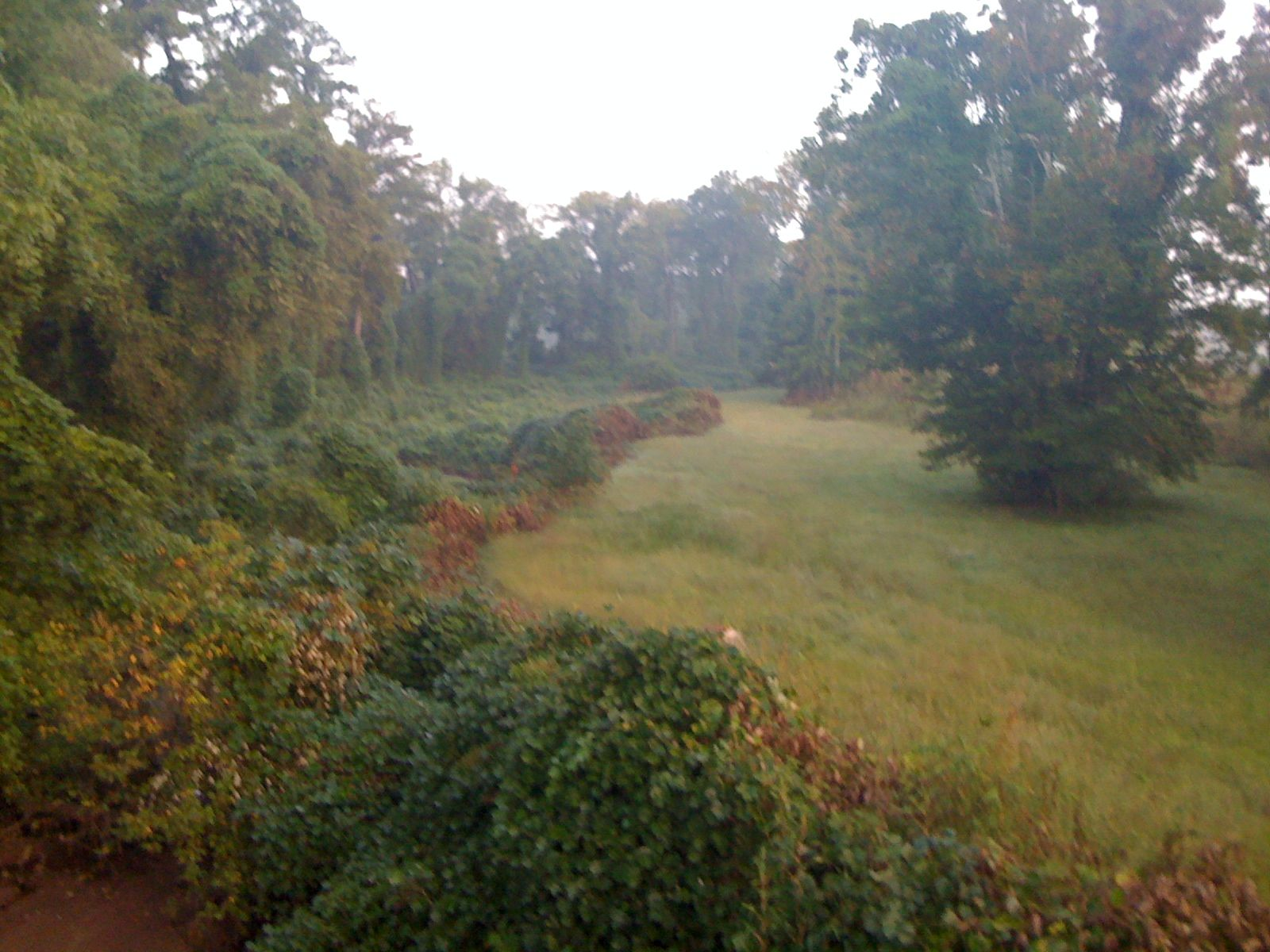
Noonday Creek looking west from Chastain Meadows, as of Sep 9, 2009.

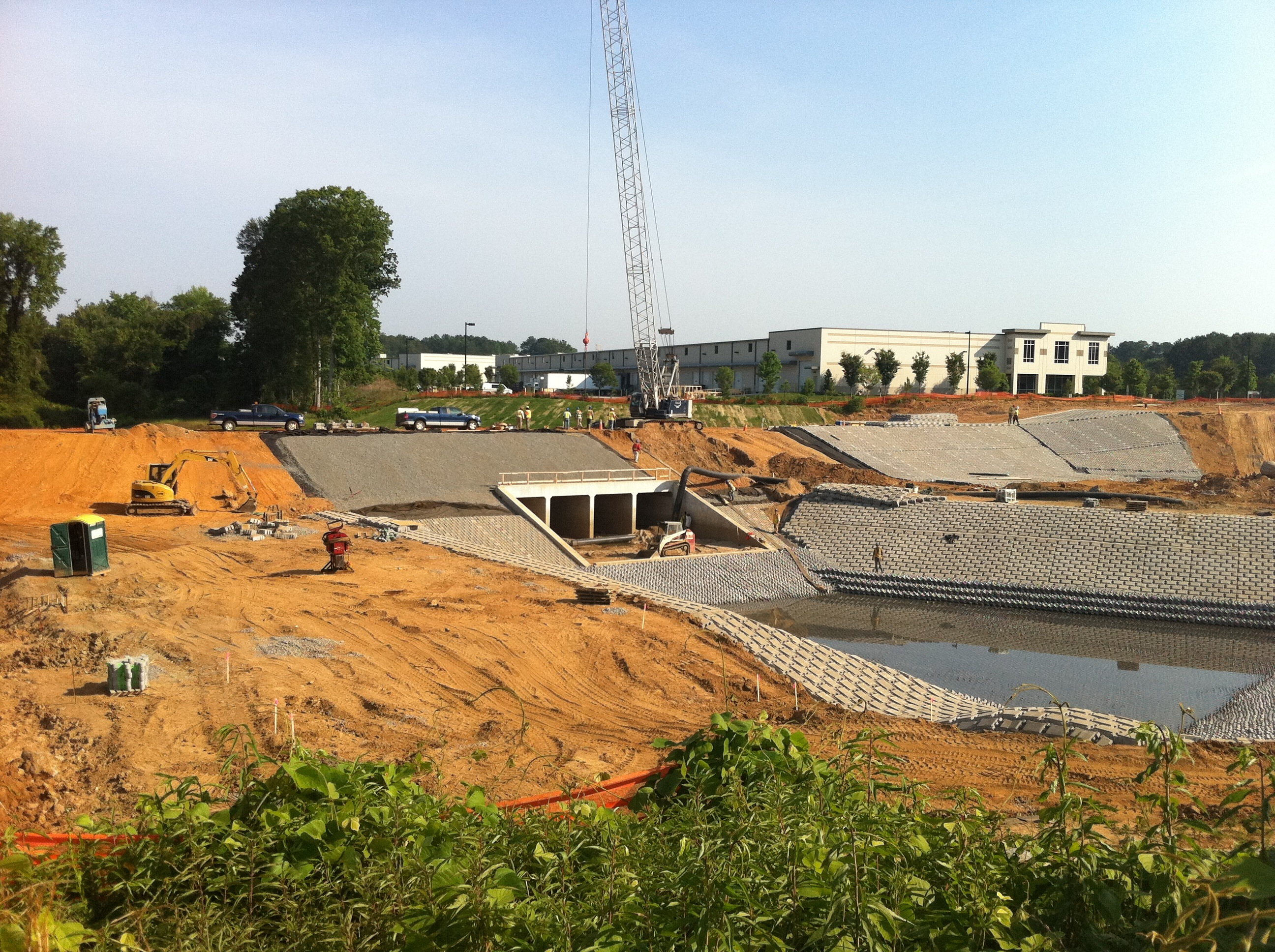
Noonday Creek looking west from Chastain Meadows, as of May 23, 2011.

== Geography ==
Noonday Creek is a tributary of the Little River, joining it within Lake Allatoona just to the north of the Towne Lake development. The confluence of Little River and Noonday Creek now lies beneath the water of the lake.

At the northern end of Cobb County, Noonday Creek picks up outflow from the Noonday Water Reclamation Facility, a sewage treatment plant serving Cobb and Cherokee counties. A large sewer line is buried along most of the creek south (upstream) of the plant, seen as a treeless kudzu-covered flood plain, dotted with concrete mounds topped with manholes.

=== Tributaries ===
Little Noonday Creek is its only officially-named tributary, flowing north from the northeast corner of Marietta and then northwestward, joining the main creek southwest of Noonday, at Noonday Creek Park. An unnamed tributary through Lake Latimer extends from the southwest along I-575 to the north end of the park. During heavy rains, the main creek often floods the fields at the park, and increasingly so due to excessive runoff from heavy land development in the area.

Other inflows include creeks that flow from or through Laura Lake (joining at Chastain Meadows Parkway), Chastain Lakes, Bells Ferry Park (joining north of Rockbridge Road), Barrett Lakes, Ellison Lakes, Bozeman Lake (near Kennesaw State University), and Timber Lake.

=== Monitoring ===
There are two USGS stream gauges on Noonday Creek, both operating since October 2000 and reporting via uplink to GOES weather satellites. The first is at Hawkins Store Road, at the south end of Noonday Creek Park. This is at 34°03′23″N 84°32′08″W, 895 feet (273 m) AMSL, and has a watershed area of 24.3 square miles (63 km^{2}). This has location identifier NDYG1 and is reported to be 2 miles (3 km) north-northwest of Blackwells. The second is at Shallowford Road, just downstream (north) at the other end of the park, next to the entrance to the water treatment plant. This is at 34°04′06″N 84°32′08″W, 890 feet (270 m) AMSL, with a watershed area of 33.6 square miles (87 km^{2}), including Little Noonday Creek. This is identified as NOOG1 and is reported as "near Woodstock". Both streamflow and stage (depth) are reported at both locations, with a rain gauge also at the latter. The National Weather Service does not issue river flood warnings or statements for this creek as it does for Sope Creek and others in the area, nor did it set an official flood stage for it until after the 2005 flood. Minor flood stage is now considered to be 10 feet (3.0 m), while major flood is 16 feet (4.9 m), both at the Shallowford gauge. The highest the original gauges could read was 12 feet (3.7 m), replaced with 20-foot (6.1 m) ones after the 2005 flood.

== Flooding ==
Until 2009, the most severe flood known to have occurred on Noonday Creek was in July 2005, when the outer bands of Hurricane Dennis followed Hurricane Cindy by just a few days. Massive rainfall occurred, particularly with Dennis, in less than 24 hours, sending the creek to a level of 16.30 feet (4.97 m) late on July 10. That is about ten times its normal depth or height, reaching beyond what the Federal Emergency Management Agency (FEMA) and GDNR labeled its 100-year flood plain, largely because of excessive urbanization upstream. Because of this, many people did not have flood insurance.

=== September 2009 record flooding ===
In September 2009, an even worse flood occurred due to a stalled weather system, and the training of heavy showers and thunderstorms over the area. On September 21, the creek rose even higher than in 2005, blocking not only Georgia 92, but also Interstate 575 at the southern end of the ramps to 92, and flooding the Towne Lake Parkway diamond interchange and underpass (and a gas station) beneath 575 one exit north. Traffic was detoured at Chastain Road (two exits south of 92), but it also flooded at the creek and was barricaded to all traffic to the east, making it very difficult to reach alternate routes.

Because of the many closures caused by the creek's inundation, residents of Woodstock and points northward found it took hours to get home, the resulting gridlock extending rush hour well past dusk, with heavy traffic still waiting to get home at 9:00pm on old Georgia 5, which was also blocked north of Woodstock due to the Little River. The 2009 Atlanta floods were called "of historic proportions" by the local National Weather Service forecast office (NWSFO Peachtree City).

Noonday Creek at Shallowford Road crested at 19.66 feet (5.99 m), with a peak flow literally off the chart, extrapolated to be about 10,000 cubic feet (280 m^{3}) per second, compared to an average of 68. This was after receiving at least 17.5 inches (440 mm) of rain in the past week, half of which fell around midday on September 21, at which point it was already at minor flood stage. The Hawkins Store Road gauge peaked at just over 17 feet (5.2 m) before it stopped reporting around 4pm, the same time the creek crested at Shallowford. The spillway of Noonday Creek Structure Number 17 was extensively damaged. Around 362,500 dollars in damage was done to the sewage treatment facility.

=== Flood control ===
On Sep 28, 2008, Final Design Place, Specifications, and Geotechnical Report for the Chastain Meadows Regional Stormwater Management Facility was resubmitted to Georgia EPD for approval and construction of the facility was finally completed on July 31, 2011.

==== Noonday Creek Structure Number 4 ====
Noonday Creek Structure Number 4 is an earthen dam on Noonday Creek.

==== Noonday Creek Structure Number 9 ====
Noonday Creek Structure number 9, also known as Ellison Lake Dam, is of earthen construction and is used for flood control purposes. Construction was completed in 1955. Its height is 29 feet (8.8 m) with a length of 598 feet (182 m). Maximum discharge is 1,587 cubic feet per second (44.9 m^{3}/s). Its capacity is 284 acre-feet (350,000 m^{3}). Normal storage is 35 acre-feet (43,000 m^{3}). It drains an area of 400 square miles (1,000 km^{2}).

==== Noonday Creek Structure Number 16 ====
Noonday Creek Structure Number 16 is a category 1 (high hazard) earthen dam on Noonday Creek regulated by the Georgia Safe Dams Program, located a few yards north of Big Shanty Road in Kennesaw, GA. Construction was completed in 1956.

A soccer stadium and passive recreation facilities for Kennesaw State University has been constructed around the dam.

== Recreational facilities ==
=== Noonday Creek Trail ===
Because most of the trees have already been removed from along that side of the creek, the Noonday Creek Trail being built will have little further impact if a permeable surface is used. The trail will eventually extend along most of the Cobb part of the creek.

== Noonday Creek in history ==
=== Civil War ===
Noonday Creek was an important watercourse during the Battle of Noonday Creek in June and July 1864.

=== Early uses of waterpower ===
Noonday Creek furnished water power to mills in the area, including near Woodstock.
