= Noonday Water Reclamation Facility =

The Noonday Water Reclamation Facility is a sewage treatment plant that processes around 20 million gallons or 75 million liters of sewage per day for northeast Cobb and southern Cherokee counties in north-northwest metro Atlanta, located in north-central Georgia. It is operated by Cobb's water system, which partly wholesales its service to Cherokee's.

The facility is located just south of the county line and east of Interstate 575 at 415 Shallowford Road, east of Kennesaw, also serving part of Marietta and all of Woodstock, its nearest city. This generally corresponds to the drainage basin of both Noonday Creek on which it is located, and Rubes Creek to the east, which is also a tributary of the Little River, in turn flowing northward into the Etowah River via Lake Allatoona.

Around 362,500 dollars in damage was done to the facility during the historic record-high water levels of the 2009 Atlanta floods, when the creek reached about ten times its normal height and width, and about double its flood stage, according to gauges just upstream (to the south).
