= Michael Caldwell =

American politician

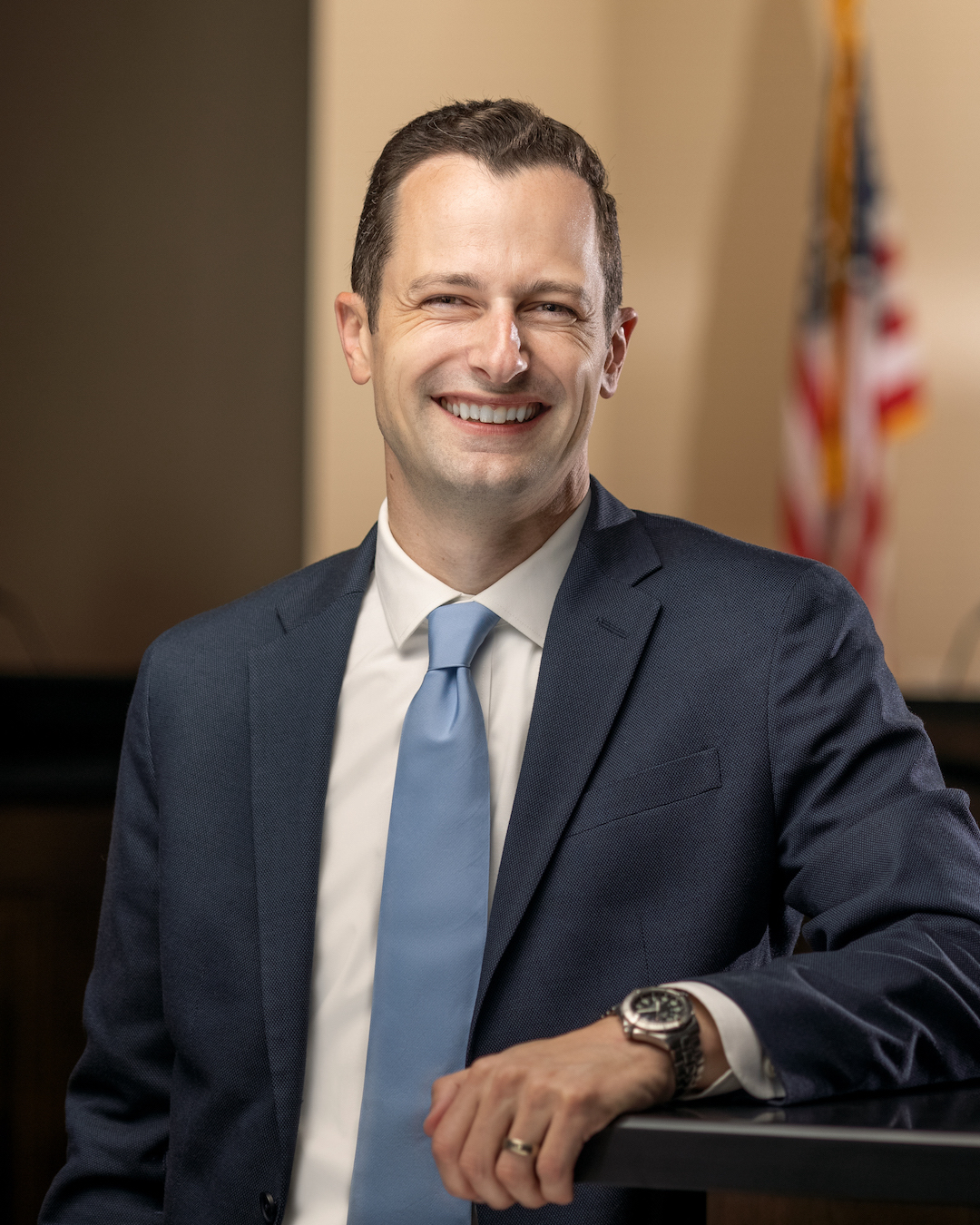
- Portrait of Michael Caldwell in the Woodstock City Council chambers.

Mayor of Woodstock
- Incumbent
- Assumed office January 1, 2022
- Preceded by: Donnie Henriques

Member of the Georgia House of Representatives from the 20th district
- In office January 13, 2013 – January 11, 2021
- Preceded by: Charlice Byrd
- Succeeded by: Charlice Byrd

Personal details
- Born: Michael Ryan Caldwell; August 26, 1989 (age 36) Ann Arbor, Michigan, U.S.
- Party: Republican
- Spouse: Katie Caldwell
- Education: Kennesaw State University (BS)

Michael Ryan Caldwell (born August 26, 1989) is an American entrepreneur and the Mayor of Woodstock, Georgia. He has served as a member of the Board of Directors of the Georgia Technology Authority since October 15, 2020, and a former Republican member of the Georgia House of Representatives for the 20th district between January 13, 2013 and January 11, 2021. He is also the cofounder and the Partner for Operations and Business Development at Black Airplane, an award-winning digital product company headquartered in Woodstock, Georgia.

== Biography ==
=== Education ===
Caldwell graduated from Etowah High School in Woodstock, Georgia in 2007. He then earned his Business Finance degree from Kennesaw State University in 2010.

=== Family ===
Michael was raised in Woodstock, Georgia after living around the country. He married his high school sweetheart Katie, and they have three children. The Caldwells live in downtown Woodstock.

=== Work and career ===
Michael Caldwell is a career politician, cofounder, owner and Partner for Operations and Business Development at Black Airplane, an award-winning creative software development firm that builds apps and websites, since May 2017. Previously, Caldwell was a member of the founding team and partial owner at Python Safety, Inc. which specialized in "Fall Protection for Tools" and was acquired by 3M in 2015. He authored the most widely adopted dropped object prevention procedure in the world and spent years traveling the globe speaking on this topic.

== Georgia House of Representatives (2013–2021) ==
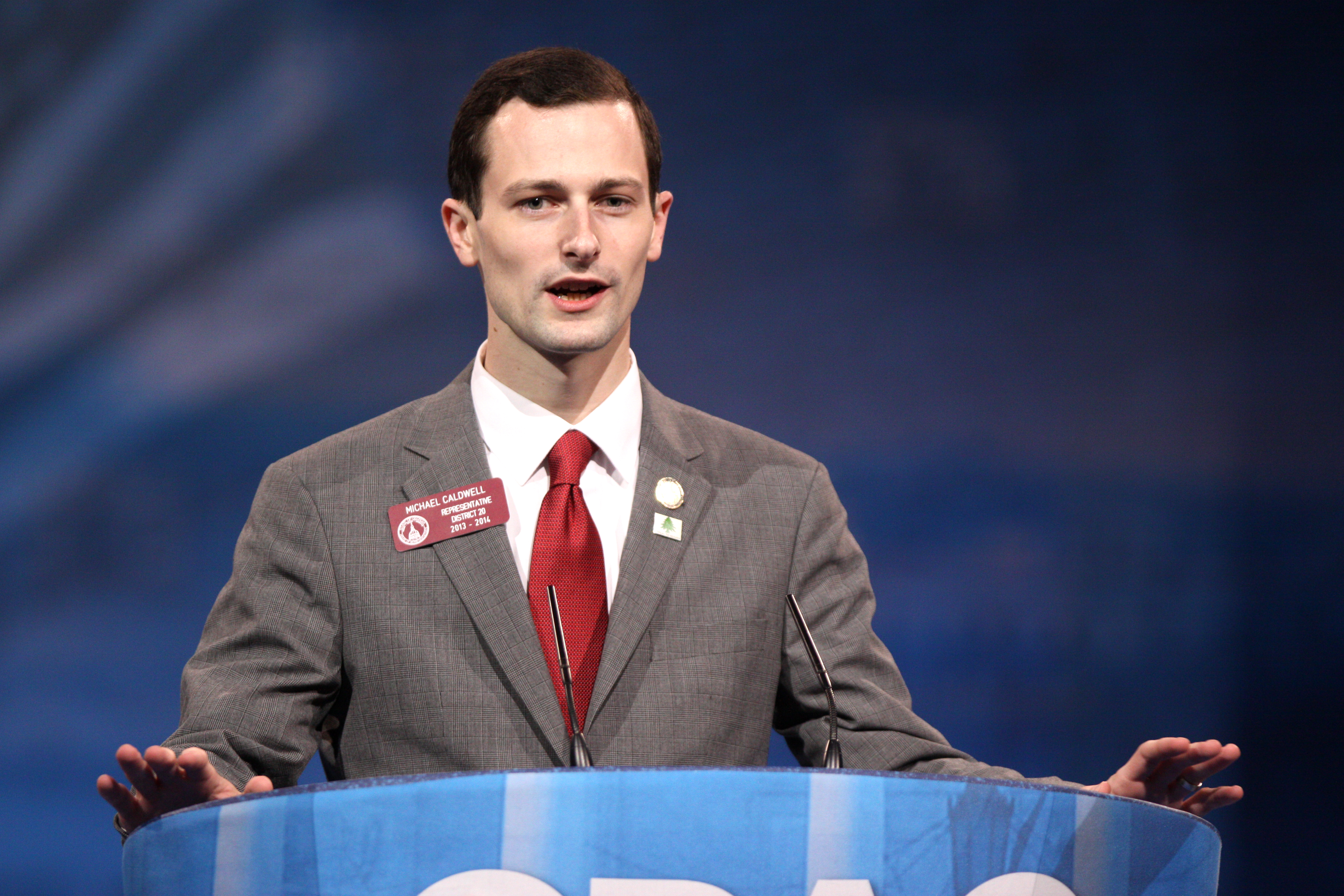
Caldwell in 2013

In September 2011, Caldwell announced his candidacy for the 20th District of the Georgia House of Representatives in the 2012 election cycle. Caldwell ran on the platform of accountable, honest, and transparent government. In the primary election that followed in July 2012, Caldwell defeated Byrd by winning 53.36% of the total vote to secure the Republican nomination. Caldwell went on to defeat the Democratic nominee in the general election in November 2012, winning 77.11% of the total vote. He then won re-election in 2014 and 2016 without opposition in the primary or general elections, and defeated the Democratic nominee in November 2018 with 69.91% of the total vote.

=== Ethics and campaign finance reform ===
Michael Caldwell was well known for refusing to accept campaign contributions or gifts from registered lobbyists or individuals from outside the State of Georgia. All of his campaign income and expenditure information was accessible via the "Finance Tracker" tool on his website. Constituents were also able to learn about Caldwell's reasoning behind his votes by accessing the "Legislative Tracker" segment of his website.

=== Committee assignments ===
Caldwell served as a member of the following Committees:

1. Code Revision - Vice Chairman
2. Economic Development and Tourism - Member
3. Regulated Industries - Member
4. Budget and Fiscal Affairs Oversight - Member
5. State Planning & Community Affairs - Member
6. Interstate Cooperation - Member

== Georgia State Senate candidacy (2019–2020) ==
In January 2019, Caldwell announced that he would be seeking election to the State Senate in Georgia's 21st district in the 2020 election cycle. He was defeated by incumbent state Senator Brandon Beach on June 9, 2020.

== Mayor of Woodstock, Georgia ==
In August 2021, Michael Caldwell was the sole qualifying candidate to become the mayor of Woodstock, Georgia and became the mayor-elect. He assumed office as the 31st mayor on January 1, 2022.
