= Sweat Mountain =

Mountain in the United States of America

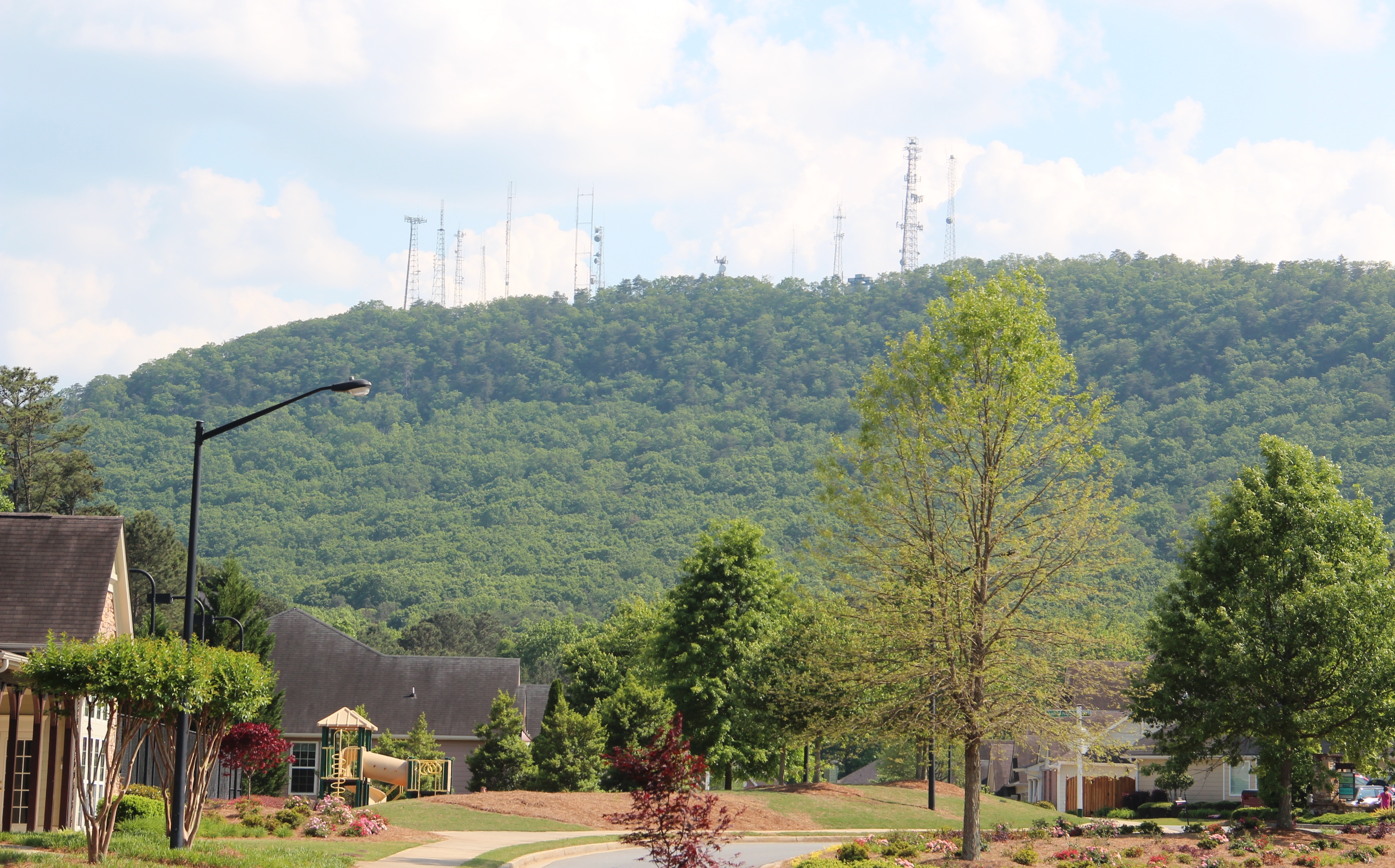
- Sweat Mountain

Highest point
- Elevation: 1,688 ft (515 m)
- Coordinates: 34°04′01″N 84°27′20″W

Geography
- Location within Georgia Location within the United States
- Location: Cobb County, Georgia, U.S.
- Parent range: Appalachian Mountains
- Topo map: USGS Mountain Park

Climbing
- Easiest route: residential streets

Sweat Mountain is a mountain in far northeastern Cobb County, Georgia, in the suburbs north of Atlanta. The exact GNIS location of its summit is 34°4′1″N 84°27′20″W, and it has an official (USGS) elevation of 1,688 ft (515 m) above mean sea level. It is the second-highest point in the county behind Kennesaw Mountain, and second in the core metro Atlanta area, behind Kennesaw Mountain, which is also in Cobb County. It is fifth if the exurban counties further north are considered.

This height has made the mountain very attractive for radio, having several transmitters, radio towers, and antennas, for pagers, cellphones, broadcasting, and amateur radio. The fact that Stone Mountain and Kennesaw Mountain are both protected as parks has led to a proliferation of technology at the top. At the same time, both the antenna farm and the densely packed houses detract from the view of the mountain from surrounding areas of northeast Cobb, south-southeast Cherokee (including much of Woodstock), and western Roswell.

The presence of the mountain has inspired the naming of a variety of nearby establishments including: Sweat Mountain Park, Mountain View Regional Library, Mountain View Elementary School, and Mountain View United Methodist Church.

Sweat Mountain is also a part of the ridge that divides the Chattahoochee River basin to the south and southeast, from the Lake Allatoona (Etowah River) basin to the north and northwest. From Sweat Mountain, this runs west-southwest through Cobb to Kennesaw Mountain and Lost Mountain.

== History ==
At one time the entire mountain was owned by the Wigley family. Henry Clay Wigley continued to live at the base of the mountain for decades. Right across from his house was a gravel road that led to the summit. Years ago, before satellites took over, a U.S. Forest Service ranger would scale a giant fire tower to provide smoke coordinates for fire control every day. With suburbanization, this tower has been removed, but there is a benchmark set in concrete where one of the tower feet once rested. On the most northern side of the summit are natural rock formations, including a natural rock shelter that could house one or two campers.

Wigley Road at one time went from Sandy Plains Road all the way through to Georgia 92, but it was closed in the 1970s due to poor maintenance. The main road now turns off from itself (makes a 90-degree turn) and continues generally west as Jamerson Road. Following the remaining Wigley Road to the dead end, there is a barrow pit just past the barricades. There was a place where natural springs created a huge swampy mudbog in the middle of the Wigley Road, which led to its closing.

In the early 1970s, a lake off Sandy Plains Road at the base of the mountain served as the site for a huge music festival.

In early April 2006, the south side of the mountain was grazed by an F1 tornado, causing relatively minor damage to some homes. The storm moved due east from Noonday to Alpharetta, doing much more serious damage in several other places.

== Broadcasters ==
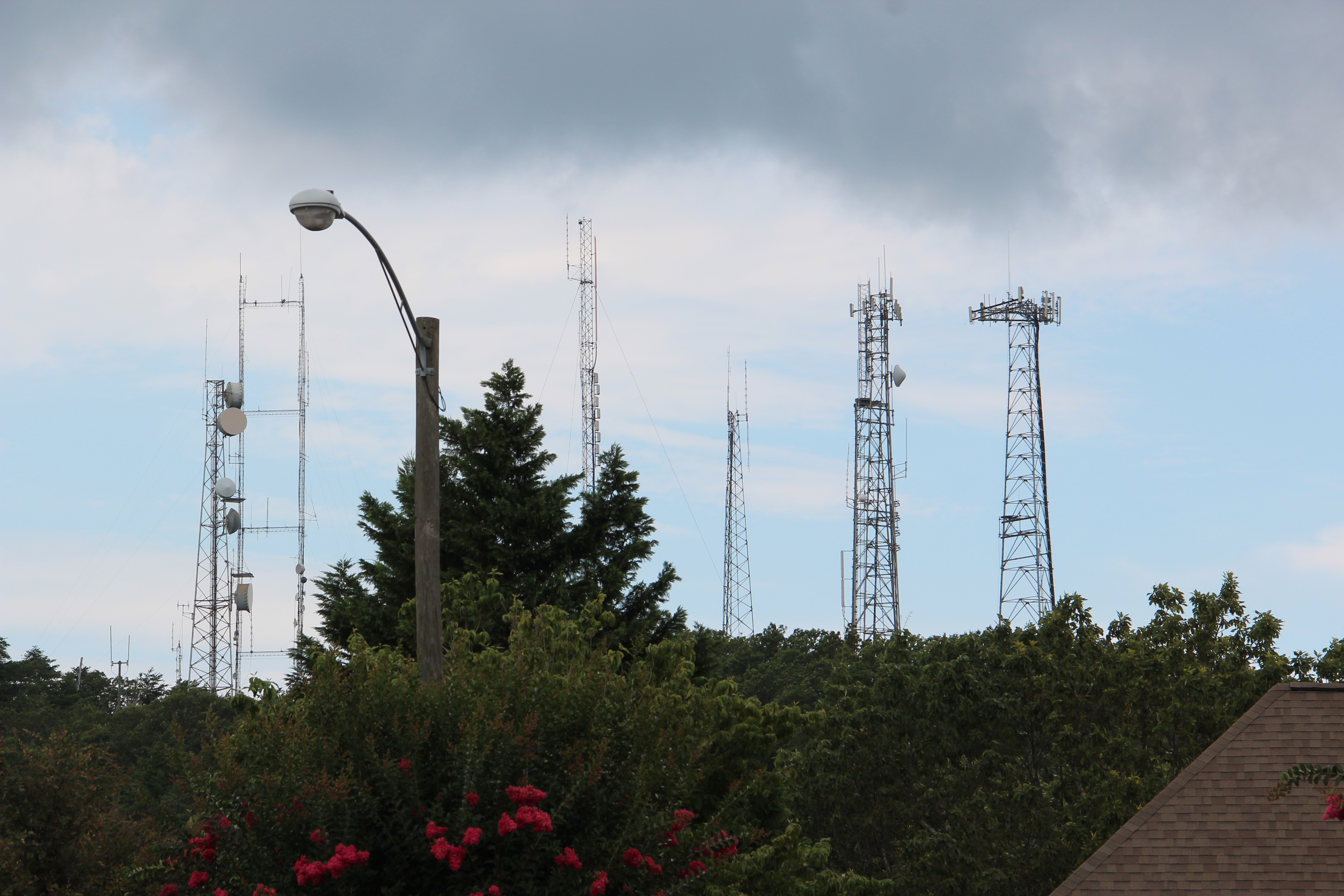
Antennas on the summit

The following broadcast stations are all within 300 meters or 1000 feet of the summit, and are listed with callsign, frequency or channel, community of license, and licensee/owner.

=== Radio ===
- WBZY FM 105.7 Canton, IHeartMedia
- W265AV FM 100.9 Woodstock, Immanuel Broadcasting Network
- ~~W229AG~~ FM 93.7 Sandy Plains, Calvary Chapel of Twin Falls — now relaying WWWQ FM 99.7 from WWWQ's own tower at North Druid Hills
- W201DM FM 88.1, Calvary's new station relaying KAWZ from Idaho since April 2014

There are also long-standing applications (potentially moot) for broadcast translators by Calvary Chapel on 94.5 and 103.7 to serve Woodstock. Another application for a translator on 102.1 by Community Public Radio to serve "Sweat Mountain" (which is not a recognized community) is also listed by the Federal Communications Commission (FCC).

=== Television ===
- WATC-DT 41 (DTV 57.1), Atlanta, Community Television, Inc.
- ~~WSKC-CA~~ 22, Atlanta, KM Communications — silent, digital is now near Norcross
- ~~WXID-LP 49~~ (originally W55BM), Marietta, Word of God Fellowship (silent, broadcast JCTV under TBN ownership)
- ~~WDWW-LD 7~~ (briefly-on-air DTV permit for WDWW-LP analog 28 in Cleveland, Georgia), Atlanta, Richard C. & Lisa A. Goetz of Hendersonville, Tennessee

There was also a 50 kW transmitter on former TV channel 55 (700 MHz block D, 716-722 MHz) for MediaFLO, a pay TV service available on mobile TV. It was part of a single-frequency network across the metro area, and all operate under callsign WPZA237 nationally. It was located 26 meters (85 ft) above ground level of approximately 1,620 feet (490 m), at 34°3′59″N 84°27′14″W, a separate tower from those listed for the other stations above.

A second transmitter on former channel 56 (block E, 722–728 MHz) was used by Manifest Wireless (which, like Dish Network, is a subsidiary of EchoStar). It was also an SFN, and used eight locations in metro Atlanta to transmit an ATSC signal, under callsign WQJY980. ATSC tuners showed high signal strength, however there were no standard MPEG-2 channels available, and it appeared that it would be used for ATSC-M/H, the mobile TV standard for terrestrial television stations. (This is different from the worldwide DVB-SH standard, which is derived from the DVB-S standard that Dish Network has used for DBS since the 1990s.) The signal from Sweat Mountain was active, but no service to the public was ever announced.

== Amateur repeaters ==
=== Radio ===
- ~~NF4GA (−0.6 MHz, 100 Hz),~~ sponsored by the North Fulton Amateur Radio League
- ~~W4DOC 146.820 (−0.6 MHz, 146.2 Hz)~~, sponsored by the Atlanta Radio Club (remote receiver for repeater at Bank of America Plaza) off air as of 4/1/2018
- W4PME 145.410 (−, 100 Hz), remote receiver for repeater W4PME
- N4NQV 147.345 (+0.6 MHz) (151.4 Hz) sponsored by the Big Shanty Repeater Group
- W4PME 224.620 (−, 100 Hz), sponsored by the North Fulton Amateur Radio League
- K4RFL 224.960 (−, 100 Hz) Georgia International off air as of 3/18/2014
- K4RFL 442.875 (+5.0 MHz, 100 Hz) Georgia International RA off air as of 3/18/2014
- NF4GA 444.475 (+5.0 MHz, 100 Hz), sponsored by the North Fulton Amateur Radio League
- W5JR 927.0125 (−25 MHz, 146.2 Hz), sponsored by the North Fulton Amateur Radio League
- N4YCI 927.5750 (−25 MHz, 151.4 Hz)

=== Television ===
- N4NEQ 427.2500 MHz AM TV (input 1250 MHz FM 20 MHz modulation) sponsored by the Atlanta ATV

=== Digital packet radio ===
- N4NEQ 144.390 (N4NEQ-2 APRS digipeater) Big Shanty Repeater Group
- KD4NC/R 146.73 (−0.6 MHz), AX.25 (repeater, NOT a digipeater)
