= Noonday Creek Trail =

Cobb County, Georgia trail

Coordinates: 34°0′4.1″N 84°35′33.1″W

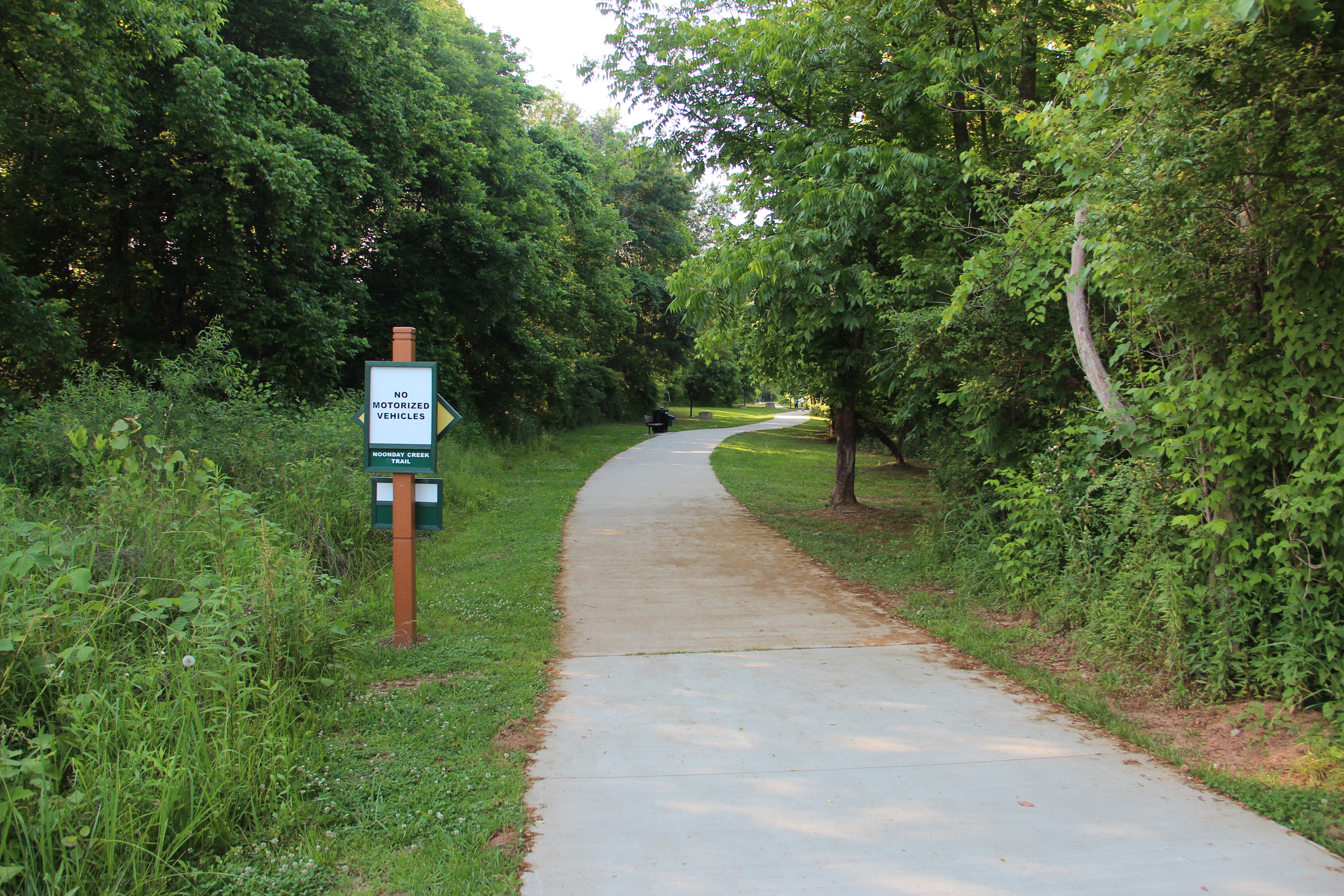
Noonday Creek Trail in Woodstock

The Noonday Creek Multi-Use Trail in Cobb County, Georgia is a seven-mile (11 km) continuation of the Mountain to River Trail in Kennesaw. Its southwest end is at Kennesaw Mountain National Battlefield Park, Old 41 Highway and Stilesboro Road. Much of the trail runs alongside Noonday Creek. Noonday Creek Trail connects Kennesaw Mountain National Battlefield Park to Town Center Mall, and its north eastern trailhead is at 3015 Bells Ferry Road, Marietta, GA 30066.

There is a 0.73 mile segment of multi-use trail north from the trailhead on Bells Ferry Road. This trail is alongside Bells Ferry Road between the trailhead and Big Shanty Road to the north. It turns westward at Big Shanty Road with its other end at the intersection of Big Shanty Road and Chastain Meadows Parkway.

The trail south of Kennesaw Mountain is Mountain-to-River Trail, which can be followed through Marietta and part of Smyrna.

North of the Cobb County Noonday Creek Trail is a separate Noonday Creek Trail in Woodstock, Georgia. This section is one and a half miles from Highway 92 to downtown Woodstock. It runs underneath Dupree Road, beside Woofstock Dog Park and Town Lake Pass Trail, and its north end is Market Street, one block west of Main Street. The south entrance to this trail is at 9745 GA-92, Woodstock, GA 30188. The north entrance is near 818 Market Street, the corner of Market and Elm.

The unconnected distance between the Woodstock and the Cobb County Noonday Creek Trail is 5 to 6 miles.

The Noonday Creek Trail is the only park in Georgia to receive funds from the National Park Centennial Initiative.

== Noonday Creek Trail Phase 2B ==
Phase 2B of the Noonday Creek Trail connects US 41 to Barrett Lakes Parkway.

== Noonday Creek Trail Phase 2C ==
Phase 2C of the Noonday Creek Trail connects Barrett Lakes Parkway to Bells Ferry Road.
