= Sewell Mill Creek =

Cobb County Creek

Coordinates: 33°57′46″N 84°27′20″W

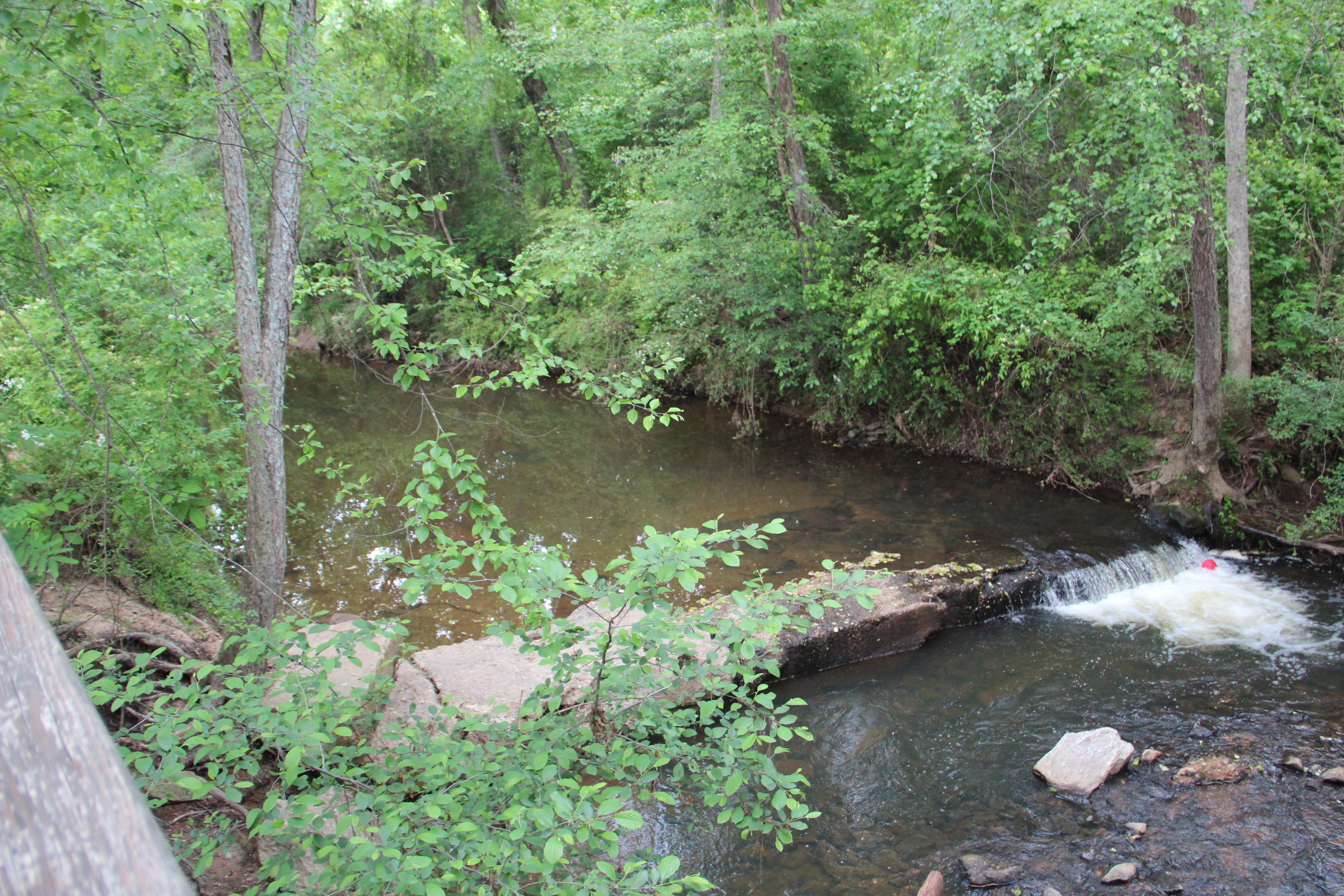
Sewell Mill Creek in East Cobb Park

Sewell Mill Creek is a stream in northeastern Cobb County, Georgia, United States, historically significant for powering the 19th-century Sewell Mills. The creek passes through East Cobb Park, eventually draining into Sope Creek and the Chattahoochee River. It is part of the Apalachicola River basin. The Sewell Mill Creek is historically significant for powering the 19th‑century Sewell Mills, from which both the creek and Sewell Mill Road derive their names. The USGS (United States Geological Survey) operates a gauge along the creek at SR-120 or Roswell Road, which measures a drainage area of about 12.57 square miles at an elevation of approximately 913.85 feet.

== History ==
Sewell Mill Creek is named after the historic Sewell Mills, originally built in the 1840s by brothers Isaac and Samuel Sewell. In the year 1840, Samuel Sewell bought 40 acres of land from an original winner of the Georgia Land Lottery of 1832, Angus MacMillian. Later in 1856, Isaac Sewell bought an additional 40 acres of land from another original winner of the same lottery, Samuel M Devereux.

Most of Cobb County was rural at this time, with agriculture driving the economy. Water sources were essential to sustain this, and the Sewell Mill Creek provided a steady flow. The mills consisted of a water-powered grist mill, processing corn and wheat into baked goods for people in the area, and a few sawmills upstream that have little remains today. This mill began to serve as a central role in daily life. Overtime, the Sewell Mill became a gathering point for farms and settlements, which led to the creation of surrounding roads and paths, including what later became Sewell Mill Road.

During the Civil War, it is said that "When Sherman's troops arrived in 1864, women working at the mill (while the men were off fighting) had taken all of the working parts of the mill and hidden them in the creek. Upon departure of the Federal troops, the parts were re-installed and the mill resumed operations."

== Geography ==
The Sewell Mill Creek flows generally flows to the south throughout the northeastern Cobb region. After going through East Cobb Park, the creek joins into Sope Creek, a larger watershed, eventually draining into the Chattahoochee River. The Sewell Mill Creek contributes to the regional water system that supplies both ecological habitats and downstream water resources.

== Relationship to local infrastructure ==
In the 1970s, suburban development expanded rapidly across East Cobb as developers began building residential neighborhoods on previously affordable land. Prior to this period, much of the area was considered too distant from Atlanta for large-scale development. As suburban growth increased, numerous homes were constructed along Sewell Mill Creek, with the creek providing a natural landscape feature within residential areas.

== Recreation ==
The Sewell Mill Creek Loop at East Cobb Park is an easy 0.9-mile (1.4 km) trail that is stroller-, dog-, and wheelchair-friendly. It is popular for casual walking, birding, and viewing wildflowers.

Sewell Mill Creek is also a known fishing spot, with fish such as largemouth bass, bluegill, and pumpkinseed commonly caught in its waters.

== Legacy ==
Remains of the mill are still visible today along Sewell Mill Road.
