= Asian American Hotel Owners Association =

US trade association

- Abbreviation: AAHOA
- Formation: 1989 (37 years ago)
- Legal status: Trade association
- Purpose: Hospitality industry resource
- Headquarters: Atlanta, GA, U.S.
- Location: 1100 Abernathy Road, Suite 725, 30328-6707
- Coordinates: 33.9341409°N 84.35231629999998°W
- Members: 20,000
- President & CEO: Laura Lee Blake, Esq.
- Chairman: Bharat Patel (2023-2024)
- Website: AAHOA

The Asian American Hotel Owners Association (AAHOA) is a trade association that represents hotel owners. As of 2024, AAHOA says it has approximately 36,000 properties in the United States. AAHOA provides service and support for hoteliers through its educational offerings, policy and political advocacy for the interests of hotel owners, opportunities for professional development, and community engagement.

It is the largest body of hotel and motel owners in the US. The association's current President & CEO is Laura Lee Blake.

== History ==
Indian Americans in the hotel and motel industry early on faced discrimination, both from the insurance industry and from competitors placing "American owned" signs outside their properties to take business from them. In 1985, a group was formed in Tennessee, the Mid-south Indemnity Association, which then grew nationwide and changed its name to the Indo American Hospitality Association. Another group of Indian hoteliers was created in Atlanta in 1989 to address discrimination issues and increase awareness of Asian Americans working in the hospitality industry under the name Asian American Hotel Owners Association. In 1994, the organizations merged in order to work more efficiently to defend Asian hotel owners’ interests throughout the United States.

=== Anti-ADA stance ===
In 2018, the AAHOA lobbied on behalf of legislation opposed by the disabled community because the law would decimate enforcement of the Americans with Disabilities Act of 1990 and opens the door to further attacks on civil rights laws.

== See also ==
- Confederation of Tourism and Hospitality
