= Georgia Safe Dams Program =

The Georgia Safe Dams Program is part of the Environmental Protection Division of the Georgia Department of Natural Resources. The Safe Dams Program must:

- Inventory all existing and proposed dams over 25 feet (7.6 m) tall or with a 100 acre-feet (120,000 m^{3}) of storage at the top of the dam.
- Reinventory existing low hazard (Category II) dams at least every five years.
- Classify dams based on development within the dam failure flood zone downstream.
- Approve plans and specifications for construction and repair of all high hazard (Category I) dams.
- Continuously monitor Category I dams for safety.

Category I dams might result in loss of human life upon failure or improper operation; Category II would not.
