= East Cobb, Georgia =

- Unincorporated community
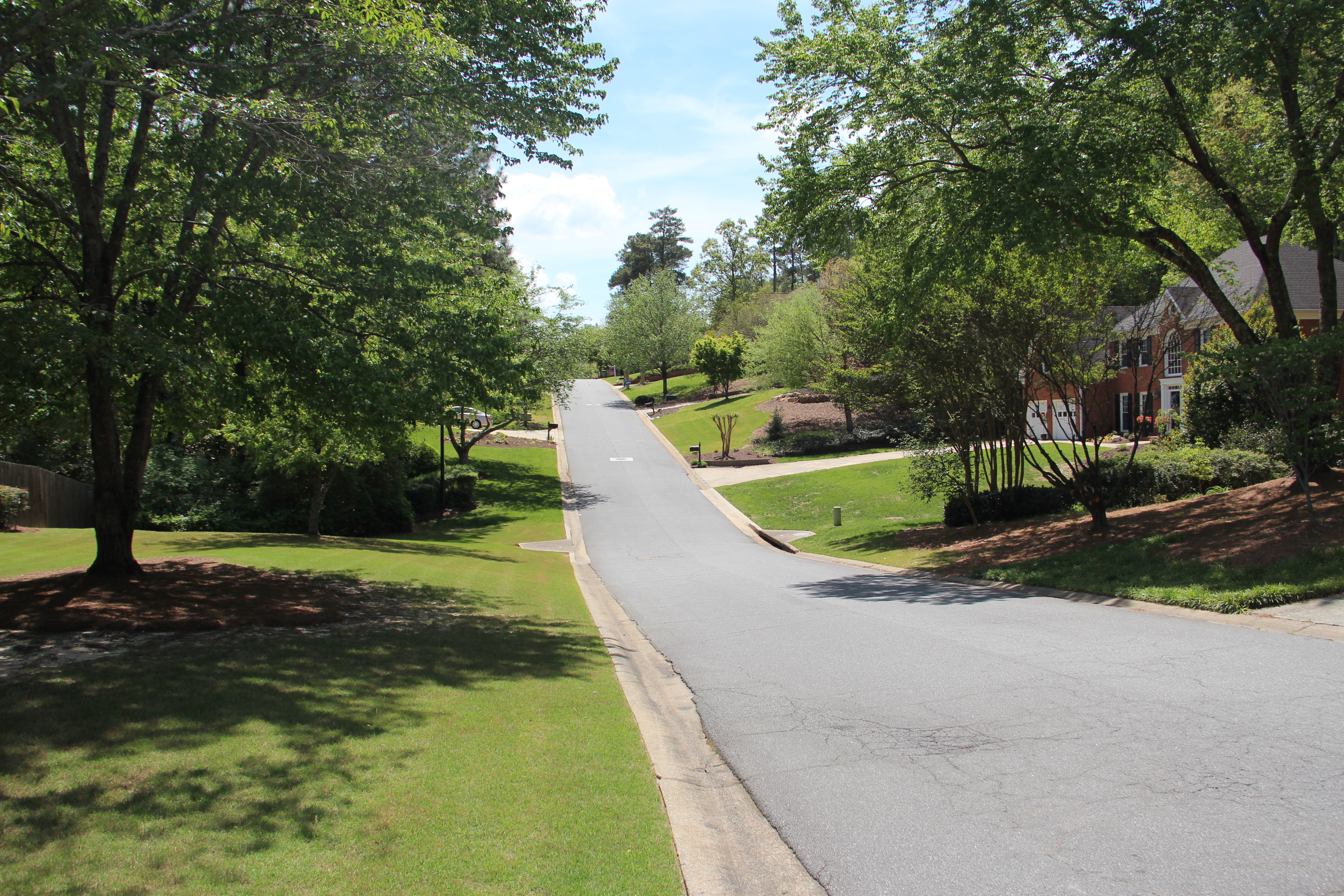
- A subdivision in East Cobb

- Location within Metro Atlanta
- Coordinates: 33°57′58″N 84°24′41″W
- Country: United States
- State: Georgia
- County: Cobb
- Elevation: 1,056 ft (322 m)

Population (2020)
  - Total: 164,055 (Northeast Cobb CCD)
- Time zone: UTC-5 (Eastern (EST))
  - Summer (DST): UTC-4 (EDT)
- ZIP codes: 30062, 30066, 30068, 30067, 30075
- Area codes: 770/678/470/404

East Cobb is an unincorporated community in Cobb County, Georgia, United States, with a population of 164,055 people.

== History ==
The area was developed as a suburb of Atlanta beginning in the 1960s. In contrast to other northern suburbs of Atlanta, East Cobb has remained unincorporated. Residents of East Cobb typically hold a Marietta address, although they are outside Marietta city boundaries.

The idea of incorporating East Cobb as a city was suggested in 2009 by the organization "Citizens for the City of East Cobb". Yet the first serious discussion of incorporating East Cobb was initiated in 1998 by then Cobb County chairman Bill Byrne. Under Byrne's proposal, the city's boundary lines would be drawn by the Cobb Legislative Delegation, the county government would continue to provide water, sewer, police and fire services to the city for a nominal fee of one dollar per year, and the city would be governed by an elected mayor and five City Council members, with wards drawn by the Cobb Delegation. However, Byrne was defeated by Cobb County Chairman Incumbent Tim Lee, who dismissed the idea of incorporating East Cobb as a "solution looking for a problem."

In March 2019, Matt Dollar, a local representative in the Georgia House of Representatives announced that he would be submitting a bill to create the legislation necessary for East Cobb cityhood. The bill could not be approved by the legislature or by referendum until 2020; the Georgia Senate passed the measure on February 10, 2022, setting up a referendum vote by East Cobb residents in May 2022. If East Cobb were to incorporate as a city, it would be the largest in the county and the second largest in metro Atlanta (behind Atlanta), with around 150,000 residents. The referendum vote failed with 73% no votes, effectively precluding East Cobb cityhood.

== Geography ==
East Cobb is roughly bounded by:

- Cherokee County to the north
- Willeo Creek and Roswell in Fulton County to the northeast
- the Chattahoochee River and Sandy Springs in Fulton County to the southeast
- Bell's Ferry Road, I-575, and the Marietta city limits to the west, and
- Interstate 285 and the Cumberland/Galleria edge city at the southern tip.

East Cobb is within the Northeast Cobb census county division.

=== Climate ===
East Cobb has a humid subtropical climate (Köppen climate classification Cfa). The climate is slightly cooler than other areas of the metro with a higher elevation, predominantly above 1,000 feet (300 m) in most areas. Sweat Mountain is the highest elevation in the East Cobb area at 1,688 feet (515 m) above sea level. East Cobb receives in excess of 50 inches (1,300 mm) of rain and roughly 3 inches (76 mm) of snow annually. Two of the largest snowfalls historically in East Cobb were the 1993 Storm of the Century and the storm on 7 and 8 December in 2017. Both storms dropped anywhere from 6–12 inches (150–300 mm) of snow on East Cobb.

Climate data for Allatoona Dam, Georgia 1990-2020 Normals
Month	Jan	Feb	Mar	Apr	May	Jun	Jul	Aug	Sep	Oct	Nov	Dec	Year
Mean daily maximum °F (°C)	50.9 (10.5)	55.3 (12.9)	63.4 (17.4)	72.2 (22.3)	78.8 (26.0)	84.9 (29.4)	88.0 (31.1)	87.4 (30.8)	82.2 (27.9)	72.6 (22.6)	61.6 (16.4)	53.6 (12.0)	70.9 (21.6)
Daily mean °F (°C)	39.9 (4.4)	43.4 (6.3)	51.0 (10.6)	59.3 (15.2)	67.4 (19.7)	74.4 (23.6)	77.6 (25.3)	77.2 (25.1)	71.6 (22.0)	60.8 (16.0)	49.7 (9.8)	43.0 (6.1)	59.6 (15.3)
Mean daily minimum °F (°C)	29.0 (−1.7)	31.6 (−0.2)	38.6 (3.7)	46.4 (8.0)	56.0 (13.3)	63.9 (17.7)	67.3 (19.6)	67.0 (19.4)	61.0 (16.1)	49.1 (9.5)	37.9 (3.3)	32.4 (0.2)	48.4 (9.1)
Average precipitation inches (mm)	4.92 (125)	4.43 (113)	4.97 (126)	4.53 (115)	3.90 (99)	4.01 (102)	4.90 (124)	4.13 (105)	3.94 (100)	3.42 (87)	3.94 (100)	4.69 (119)	51.78 (1,315)
Source: NOAA

== Economy ==
=== Shopping ===
Merchant's Walk is a 367,600-square-foot (34,150 m^{2}) open-air shopping center with retailers, restaurants, and a movie theater originally built in 1976 and since expanded and twice renovated, once in the early 1990s and again in 2008–2011.

The Avenue East Cobb is a 236,189-square-foot (21,943 m^{2}) open-air shopping center. It has a horseshoe-shaped form and a "period-style Main Street design" and "town square" concepts, according to its designers.

Paper Mill Village is a collection of 33 buildings linked by over a mile of pedestrian walkways. The Village includes retail tenants, restaurant tenants, and service provider tenants.

== Arts and culture ==
Taste of East Cobb is an annual event.

The YMCA operates the McCleskey Family-East Cobb and Northeast Cobb Family YMCA, recreational areas for the community.

Civic associations include a Kiwanis Club and a Rotary Club.

Cobb County Public Library operates the East Cobb Library.

== Parks and recreation ==
- East Cobb Park, established in 2001, hosts two playgrounds, walking trails, a bandstand, picnic pavilions, and stream overlooks.
- Fuller's Park hosts baseball fields, a football field, a playground, and an indoor gymnasium used for recreational activities.
- Harrison Park hosts baseball fields, a tennis court, and playground.
- Mabry Park hosts a playground and walking trails.

== Government ==
East Cobb comprises districts 2 and 3 of the Cobb County Commission.

== Education ==
Public schools in East Cobb are part of the Cobb County School District. The area comprises several high school attendance districts: Pope, Sprayberry, Wheeler, Kell, Walton, and Lassiter. The western half of the Kell district lies outside of East Cobb. The extreme western portion of the Sprayberry district (the Town Center Mall area) also lies outside of East Cobb. The extreme southwestern and southern portions of the Wheeler district lie west of I-75 and south of I-285 respectively, thus excluding these small areas from being considered a part of East Cobb.

The area known as East Cobb comprises the following middle school districts: Daniell, McCleskey, Simpson, Hightower Trail, Mabry, East Cobb, Dodgen, and Dickerson (small portions of the Daniell and East Cobb Middle School districts lie outside of East Cobb; a sliver of the eastern portion of the Palmer Middle School district can be considered a part of East Cobb).

== Media ==
East Cobb News is the only locally owned, continuously updated news website serving the East Cobb community of metro Atlanta. East Cobb News is independently operated and is not associated with any other media organization.

== Infrastructure ==
Cobb County operates the East Cobb Government Service Center, which contains a county police precinct, a Cobb Fire and Emergency Services station, and a license plate office.

== Notable people ==
- Blaine Boyer, professional baseball player
- Alton Brown, food and media personality
- Brett Butler, comedian
- Bobby Cox, former manager of the Atlanta Braves
- Newt Gingrich, former Speaker of the House of Representatives, 2012 Republican presidential candidate
- Johnny Isakson, United States Senator
- Lester Maddox, former restaurant owner and governor of Georgia; resided in East Cobb before his death
- Ty Pennington, Sprayberry High graduate, Extreme Home Makeover and Trading Spaces
- Cody Rhodes, professional wrestler and current WWE Undisputed Champion
- Chris Robinson and Rich Robinson of The Black Crowes
- Tony Schiavone, former announcer for WCW, radio sports announcer, producer, engineer, currently announcer for All Elite Wrestling
- Lawson Vaughn, professional soccer player
- T. J. Yates, NFL quarterback
- Xavier Woods, professional wrestler
- Mike Will Made It, music producer
- Scoot Henderson, NBA player for the Portland Trail Blazers
- Isaiah Collier, NBA player for the Utah Jazz
- Clarke Schmidt, MLB player for the New York Yankees
- Justin Fields, NFL quarterback for the New York Jets
- Jackson Conway, soccer player
- Bradley Chubb, NFL player
- Collin Sexton, NBA player
- Evan Engram, NFL player
- Kenyan Drake, NFL player
- Chig Okonkwo, NFL player
- Mark Bloom, MLS player
- Lita, professional wrestler and WWE Hall of Fame member
- Hutson Mason, NFL player
- Hal Hershfelt, professional NWSL player
- Stefani Robinson, Emmy-nominated television writer
- Sharife Cooper, NBA player
- Tremayne Anchrum, NFL player
- Chuma Edoga, NFL player
- Isaac Okoro, NBA player
- Mac Powell, singer for the Third Day band
- K Camp, rapper
- Lil Yachty, rapper
- Becca Tobin, actress
- Carlos Valdes, actor, singer
- Yassir Lester, comedian
- Nathaniel Lowe, MLB player
- Josh Lowe, MLB player
- Duane Underwood Jr., MLB player
- James Tibbs III, MLB player
- Rodrigo Blankenship, NFL placekicker
- Buff Bagwell, professional wrestler
- Michael Chavis, MLB player
- Carter Kieboom, MLB player
- Trey Sermon, NFL player
- Jabari Zuniga, NFL player
- Jerick McKinnon, NFL player
- Marlon Byrd, MLB player
- Flau'jae Johnson, basketball player, rapper and America's Got Talent golden buzzer recipient.
- Michelle Malone, musician
- Spencer Kieboom, MLB player
- Robin Finck, guitarist for Nine Inch Nails and Guns N' Roses
- Jeff Small, CEO of Amblin and DreamWorks Animation
- Jaylen Brown, NBA player
- Shareef Abdur-Rahim, NBA player, Olympic gold medalist
- Douglas Lima, professional Mixed Martial Artist
- Tiera Guinn Fletcher, engineer for Boeing and NASA
- Bob Tway, golfer and 1986 PGA Championship winner
- Trey Wolfe, NFL player
- Aries Merritt, Olympic gold medalist
- Robby Ginepri, tennis player
- Amir Abdur-Rahim, basketball coach
- Jeremy Hermida, MLB player
- DeQuan Jones, NBA player
- Tammy Susan Hurt, Vice Chair of the Board of Trustees of the Recording Academy

== See also ==
- Chattahoochee Plantation - a former city and currently unincorporated area in southeastern East Cobb bordering the Chattahoochee River and Sandy Springs in Fulton County
