= Woodstock, Georgia =

- City
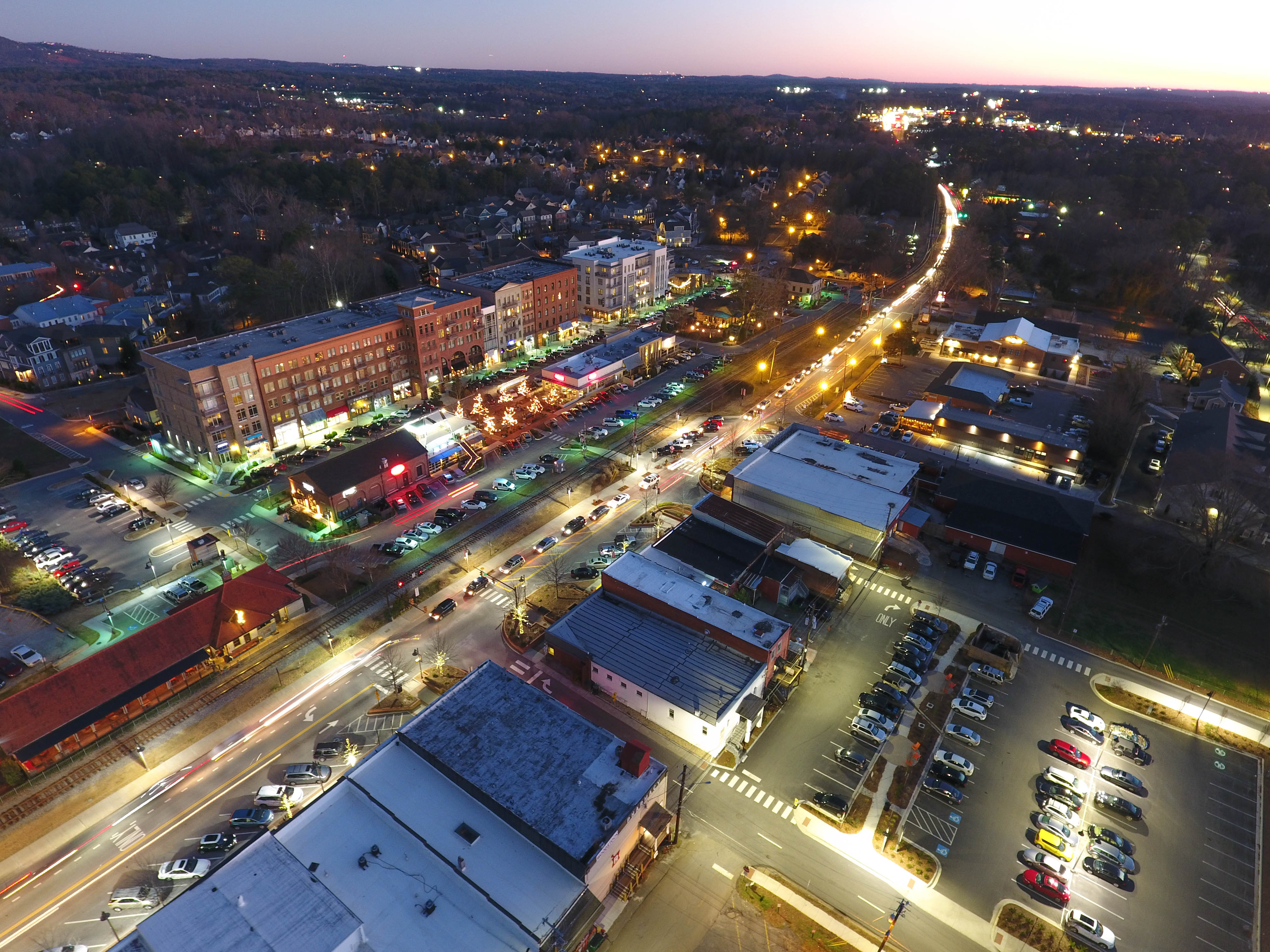
- Downtown Woodstock

- Flag Seal
- Coordinates: 34°06′05″N 84°31′10″W
- Country: United States
- State: Georgia
- County: Cherokee

Government
  - Mayor: Michael Caldwell (R)

Area
  - Total: 12.67 sq mi (32.81 km^{2})
  - Land: 12.56 sq mi (32.53 km^{2})
  - Water: 0.11 sq mi (0.28 km^{2})
- Elevation: 955 ft (291 m)

Population (2020)
  - Total: 35,065
  - Density: 2,792.1/sq mi (1,078.04/km^{2})
- Time zone: UTC−5 (EST)
  - Summer (DST): UTC−4 (EDT)
- ZIP Codes: 30188–30189
- Area code: 770/678/470
- FIPS code: 13-84176
- GNIS feature ID: 0333462
- Website: woodstockga.gov

Woodstock is a city in Cherokee County, Georgia, United States. The population was 35,065 as of 2020 according to the US Census Bureau.

Originally a stop on the Louisville and Nashville Railroad, Woodstock is part of the Atlanta metropolitan area. The city was the tenth fastest-growing suburb in the United States in 2007. Woodstock is the 28th most-populous city in Georgia and ranked 16th for population density out of 538 municipalities.

== History ==
Native Americans were removed from the area.

The Georgia General Assembly incorporated Woodstock as a town in 1897. The community derives its name from Woodstock, an 1826 novel by Walter Scott.

The Woodstock Depot was built in 1912 by the Louisville & Nashville Railroad as the town grew. The line transported cotton, rope, and other agricultural products, as well as passengers. Passenger service ended in 1949.

== Geography ==
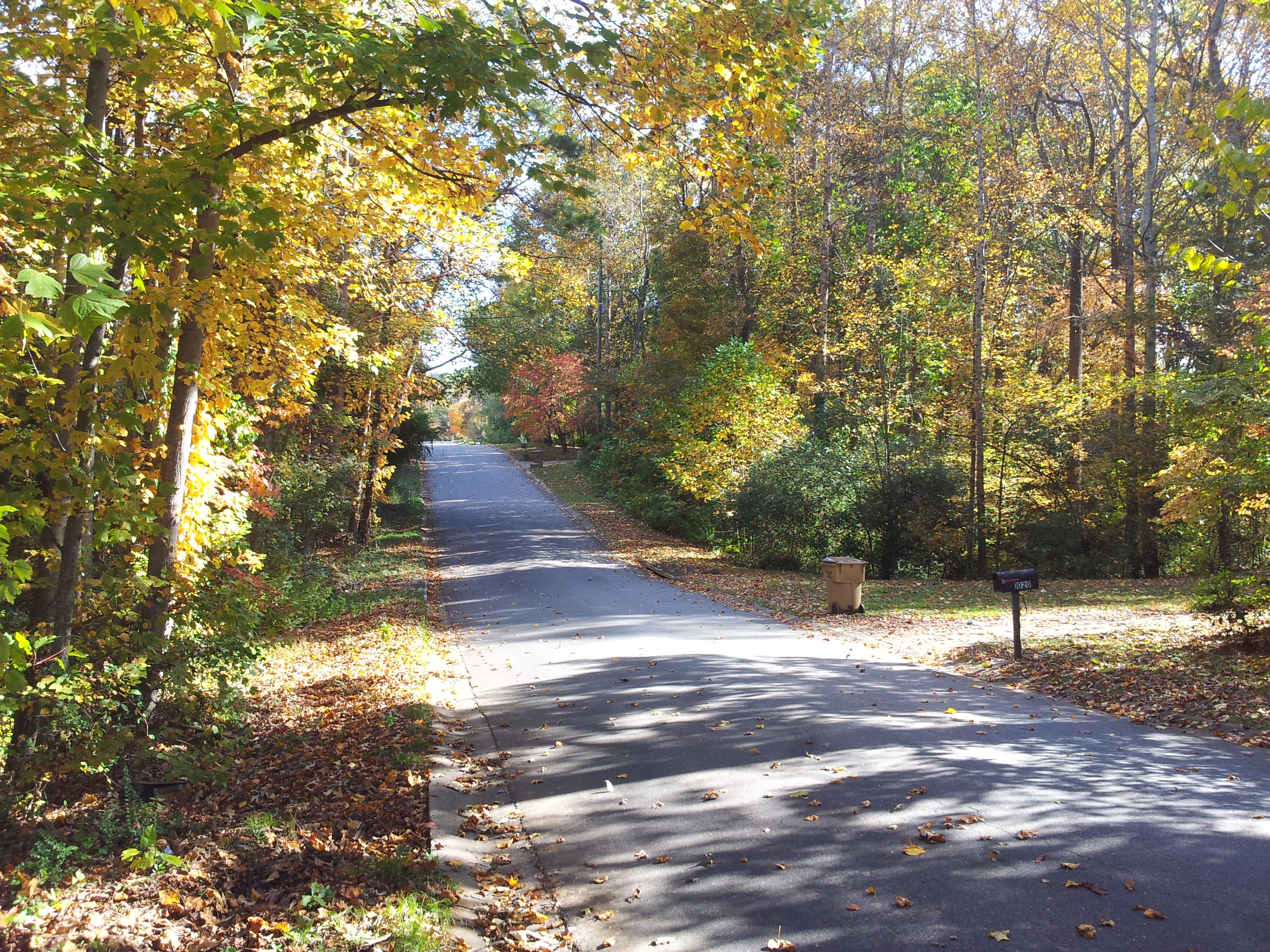
Fall in Kings Ridge Estate, Woodstock

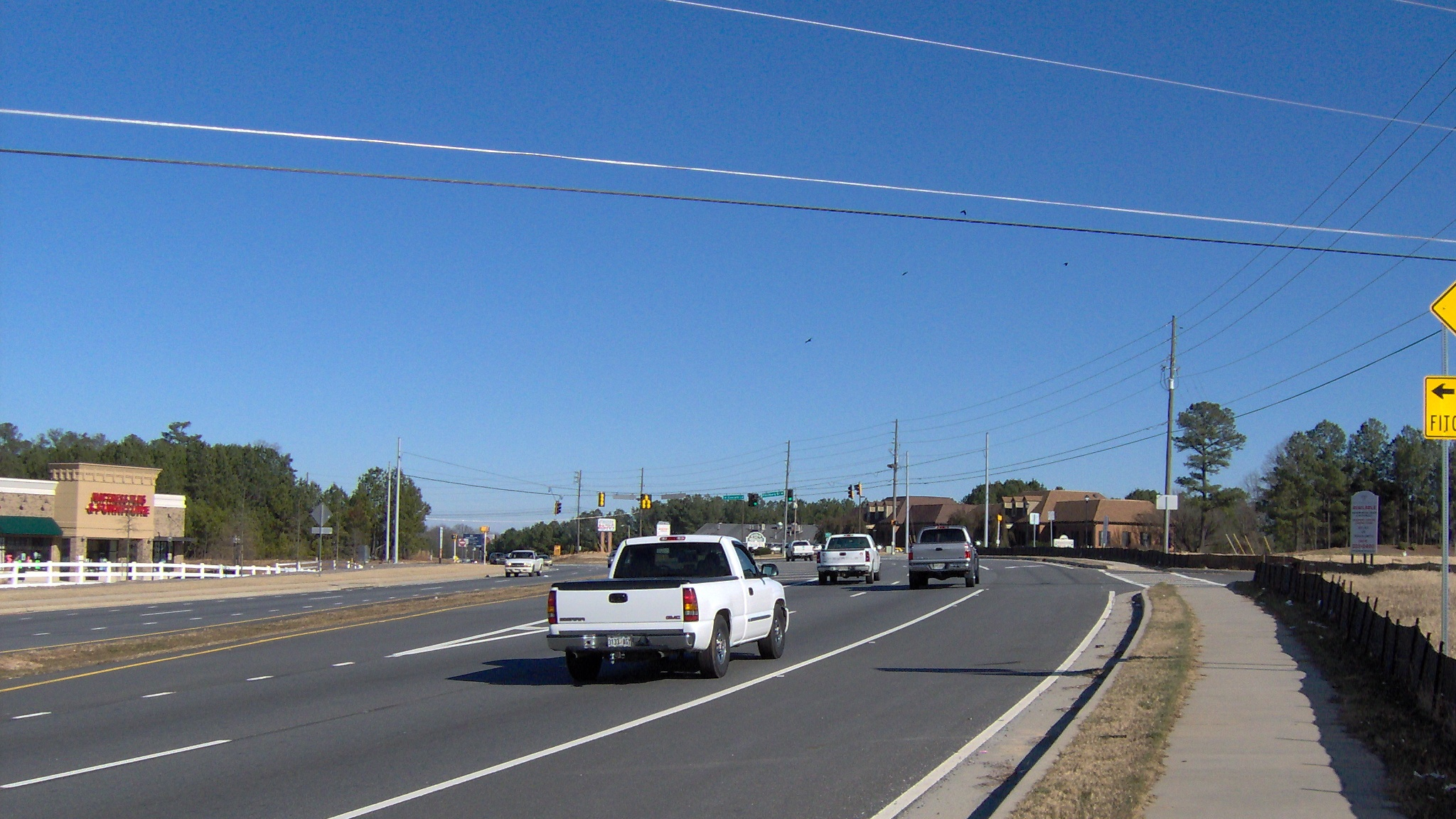
Highway 92 in Woodstock

According to the United States Census Bureau, Woodstock has a total area of 11.3 square miles (29.2 km^{2}), of which 11.2 square miles (28.9 km^{2}) is land and 0.12 square miles (0.3 km^{2}), or 0.92%, is water.

== Demographics ==
Historical population
Census	Pop.	Note	%±
1880	92		—
1900	276		—
1910	442		60.1%
1920	415		−6.1%
1930	421		1.4%
1940	389		−7.6%
1950	545		40.1%
1960	726		33.2%
1970	870		19.8%
1980	2,699		210.2%
1990	4,361		61.6%
2000	10,050		130.5%
2010	23,896		137.8%
2020	35,065		46.7%
2025 (est.)	39,895	▲	13.8%
U.S. Decennial Census; 2025

=== 2020 census ===
As of the 2020 census, Woodstock had a population of 35,065 and 14,130 households; there were 8,464 families residing in the city.

The median age was 37.7 years. 22.9% of residents were under the age of 18 and 14.3% were 65 years of age or older. For every 100 females there were 88.0 males, and for every 100 females age 18 and over there were 83.2 males age 18 and over.

100.0% of residents lived in urban areas, while 0.0% lived in rural areas.

Of the 14,130 households, 33.4% had children under the age of 18 living in them. 46.8% were married-couple households, 16.3% were households with a male householder and no spouse or partner present, and 31.0% were households with a female householder and no spouse or partner present. About 29.1% of all households were made up of individuals and 10.5% had someone living alone who was 65 years of age or older.

There were 15,010 housing units, of which 5.9% were vacant. The homeowner vacancy rate was 2.1% and the rental vacancy rate was 7.8%.

Racial composition as of the 2020 census
Race	Number	Percent
White	24,493	69.9%
Black or African American	3,958	11.3%
American Indian and Alaska Native	71	0.2%
Asian	1,542	4.4%
Native Hawaiian and Other Pacific Islander	21	0.1%
Some other race	1,434	4.1%
Two or more races	3,546	10.1%
Hispanic or Latino (of any race)	3,893	11.1%

=== 2010 census ===
As of the census of 2010, there were 23,896 people, 9,580 households, and 6,137 families residing in the city. The population density was 2,715.4 inhabitants per square mile (1,048.4/km^{2}). There were 10,298 housing units at an average density of 1,170.2 per square mile (451.8/km^{2}). The racial makeup of the city was 79.3% White, 10.2% African American, 0.2% American Indian, 4.5% Asian, 0.02% Pacific Islander, 2.7% from other races, and 3.1% from two or more races. Hispanic or Latino of any race were 9.7% of the population.

There were 9,580 households, out of which 35.2% had children under the age of 18 living with them, 48.8% were married couples living together, 11.7% had a female householder with no husband present, and 35.9% were non-families. Of all households, 29.3% were made up of individuals, and 7.5% had someone living alone who was 65 years of age or older. The average household size was 2.48 and the average family size was 3.12.

In the city, the age distribution of the population shows 26.5% under the age of 18, 6.8% from 18 to 24, 37.4% from 25 to 44, 20.8% from 45 to 64, and 8.5% who were 65 years of age or older. The median age was 34 years. For every 100 females, there were 88.4 males. For every 100 females age 18 and over, there were 84.1 males.

In 2000, the median income for a household in the city was $58,506, and the median income for a family was $65,740. Males had a median income of $48,054 versus $32,798 for females. The per capita income for the city was $25,586. About 2.2% of families and 4.2% of the population were below the poverty line, including 5.0% of those under age 18 and 8.6% of those age 65 or over.

=== 2000 census ===
As of the census of 2000, there are 10,050 people, 3,869 households, and 2,627 families residing in the city. The population density is 440.4/km^{2} (1,140.4/mi^{2}). There are 4,102 housing units at an average density of 179.8 persons/km^{2} (465.5 persons/mi^{2}). The racial makeup of the city is 89.42% White, 5.05% African American, 0.29% Native American, 1.66% Asian, 0.02% Pacific Islander, 1.94% from other races, and 1.61% from two or more races. 4.94% of the population are Hispanic or Latino of any race.

There are 3,869 households out of which 37.7% have children under the age of 18 living with them, 55.1% are married couples living together, 9.5% have a woman whose husband does not live with her, and 32.1% are non-families. Of all households, 26.1% are made up of individuals and 6.4% have someone living alone who is 65 years of age or older. The average household size is 2.55 and the average family size is 3.10.

In the city the population age distribution is 26.8% under the age of 18, 7.9% from 18 to 24, 39.0% from 25 to 44, 18.3% from 45 to 64, and 8.0% who are 65 years of age or older. The median age is 33 years. For every 100 females there are 92.2 males. For every 100 females age 18 and over, there are 87.4 males.

The median income for a household in the city is $58,506, and the median income for a family is $65,740. Males have a median income of $48,054 versus $32,798 for females. The per capita income for the city is $25,586. 4.2% of the population and 2.2% of families are below the poverty line. Out of the total people living in poverty, 5.0% are under the age of 18 and 8.6% are 65 or older.

== Arts and culture ==
=== Memorials ===
On May 25, 2009, the city of Woodstock unveiled the new Woodstock Memorial, 10 tons of polished granite dedicated to Woodstock veterans. It reads: "To the men and women of Woodstock, Georgia who served in the armed forces of our country preserving our freedom and our way of life Erected in their honor – May 2009".

A one-lane bridge over Kellogg Creek along Kemp Drive was named after 15-year-old Katie Hamlin, who was murdered in 2002.

== Parks and recreation ==
The Greenprints Project called for the construction of trails along the city's natural areas like the Little River, Noonday Creek, and the U.S. Army Corps of Engineers' property, and in the city's core areas. Bike lanes, which within the project are considered trails, would be built along roads throughout the city.

The proposed trails would connect with existing trails elsewhere in Cherokee County as well as in the cities of Roswell and Alpharetta and Cobb County. The project also would preserve greenspace throughout the city and create new parks.

Greenprints Alliance, Inc. was a grassroots citizen action group formed in spring 2009 to advance the city of Woodstock's green infrastructure master plan known as the Greenprints Project. The project planned to add over 60 miles (97 km) of trails throughout the city connecting every public place, shopping area and neighborhood.

== Infrastructure ==
=== Transportation ===
==== Major roads ====
- Interstate 575
- State Route 92

==== Pedestrians and cycling ====
- Noonday Creek Trail
- Serenade Trail
- Trestle Rock Trail

=== City services ===
Woodstock maintains its own fire and police departments. As of January 2018, the fire department had two fire stations and 44 certified fire fighters. The fire department is commanded by Dave Soumas. The police department is composed of four divisions with 54 sworn officers. Calvin Moss is the Chief of Police. They are the largest municipal police department in Cherokee County, responsible for 11 square miles (28 km^{2}) and over 23,000 residents (as of October 2007).

== Notable people ==
- Buff Bagwell, professional wrestler, five-time WCW World Tag Team champion
- Eugene T. Booth, Rhodes Scholar who constructed the Columbia University cyclotron and worked on the Manhattan Project
- Lew Carpenter, professional baseball player (Washington Senators)
- William Diehl, author of thriller novels
- Kent Emanuel, professional baseball player (Philadelphia Phillies)
- Dakota Fanning, actress
- Elijah Hirsh, American-Israeli professional basketball player (Israeli Basketball Premier League)
- Mary Hood, author
- Emma Hunt, Olympic gymnast (Competition climbing)
- Johnny Hunt, president of the Southern Baptist Convention (2008–2010)
- Harold S. Johnston, chemist and National Medal of Science laureate, recipient of the Tyler Prize for Environmental Achievement
- Chris Kirk, professional golfer
- Bryce Leatherwood, winner of season 22 of The Voice
- Nick Markakis, professional baseball player (Baltimore Orioles and Atlanta Braves)
- Bruce Miller, professional football player
- Melanie Newman, MLB baseball announcer (Baltimore Orioles)
- Bronson Rechsteiner, professional wrestler, professional football player (Baltimore Ravens)
- Chandler Riggs, actor
- Dean Rusk, United States Secretary of State (1961–1969)
- Buster Skrine, professional football player (Tennessee Titans)
- SoFaygo, rapper
- Tyler Speer, professional racer
- Drew Waters, professional baseball player (Kansas City Royals)
- Mark Wills, country music artist
