= Forsyth High School =

Forsyth High School may refer to one of several high schools in the United States:

- Forsyth High School (Missouri) — Forsyth, Missouri
- Forsyth High School (Montana) — Forsyth, Montana
- East Forsyth High School — Kernersville, North Carolina
- West Forsyth High School (disambiguation), various
- East Forsyth High School (Georgia)
- Forsyth Central High School — Cumming, Georgia
- South Forsyth High School — Cumming, Georgia
- North Forsyth High School (Georgia) — Cumming, Georgia
- North Forsyth High School (North Carolina) — Winston-Salem, North Carolina
- Maroa-Forsyth Senior High School — Maroa, Illinois
