= Big Creek CCD, Georgia =

Town and census div. in Forsyth County, GA

Coordinates: 34°06′45″N 84°10′38″W

Big Creek is a census county division in Forsyth County, Georgia, United States. It is the largest locale in the county in terms of population.

The locale is a Census county division (CCD) class of unincorporated community. It has a population of 83,973 according to the US Census Bureau's 2022 American Community Survey, representing an increase of 110 over the 83,863 reported in the 2020 United States census. With an area of 43.9 square miles (114 km^{2}), the population density is 1,914.9 inhabitants per square mile (739.3/km^{2}).

== Name origin ==
The origin of the locale lies with the creek of the same name running on the west side of the CCD's territory.

== Geography ==
Big Creek is south of Cumming, the incorporated community of the county, and is north of the Forsyth–Fulton county line. Big Creek is bounded on the east by the Chattahoochee River. The western one-third of Big Creek is separated off by US Route 19/Georgia State Route 400.

== Education ==
Big Creek is part of the Forsyth County Schools district.

The Forsyth County campus of Lanier Technical College is in the southern part of the county. The campus, which opened in 1997, was expanded in 2010.

== Library ==
Big Creek is served by the Sharon Forks branch of the Forsyth County Public Library. The branch was recognized as the busiest library in the state, with a circulation of over one million materials.

== Transportation ==
Georgia State Route 141, also called Peachtree Parkway, runs north–south through the community. US 19/SR 400 runs southwest–northeast through Big Creek.
