= North Forsyth High School =

North Forsyth High School may refer one of the following public schools:

- North Forsyth High School (North Carolina), in Winston-Salem, North Carolina
- North Forsyth High School (Georgia), in Cumming, Georgia
