= Silver City, Georgia =

Unincorporated community in Georgia, U.S.

Coordinates: 34°20′03″N 84°06′58″W

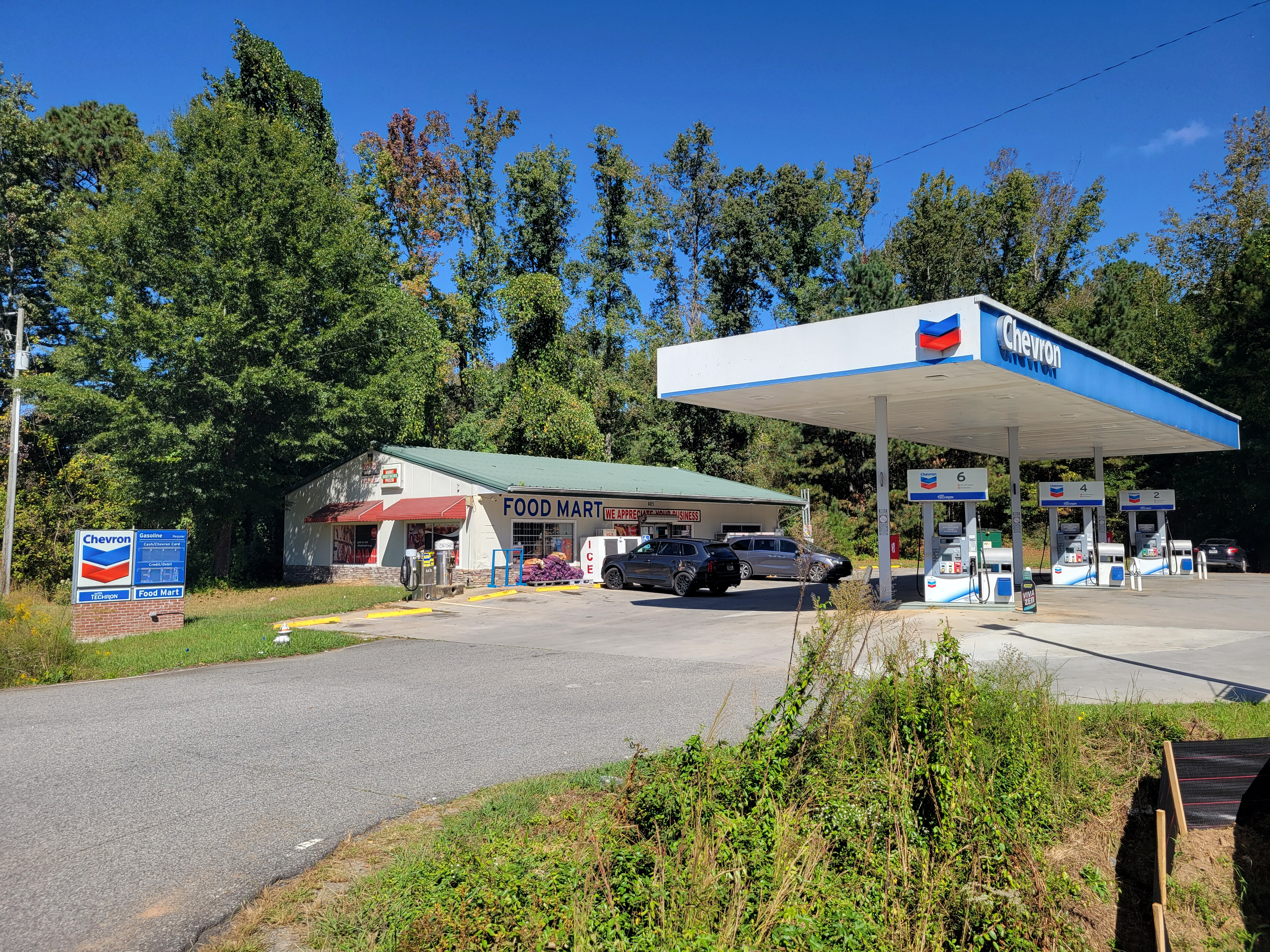
Chevron station

Silver City is an unincorporated community in Dawson and Forsyth counties, in the U.S. state of Georgia.

The 2020 United States census reported the population of the Silver City Census County Division in Forsyth County as being 29,877.

== History ==
A post office called Silver City was established in 1886, and remained in operation until 1907. The community's name most likely is a transfer from a city in the Western United States.

Silver City was a former trading post and home to one of the first telephone lines in Forsyth County.

== Education ==
As the community is located across two adjacent counties, the Silver City community's students are served by both the Forsyth County School District and the Dawson County School District.

- Silver City Elementary School
