= Ducktown =

Ducktown may refer to:

- Ducktown, Georgia, an unincorporated community
- Ducktown, Tennessee, a city
- Ducktown, Atlantic City, district of Atlantic City, New Jersey
