= East Forsyth High School =

East Forsyth High School may refer to:

- East Forsyth High School (Georgia)
- East Forsyth High School (North Carolina)
