= Mixed-use development =

Type of urban development strategy

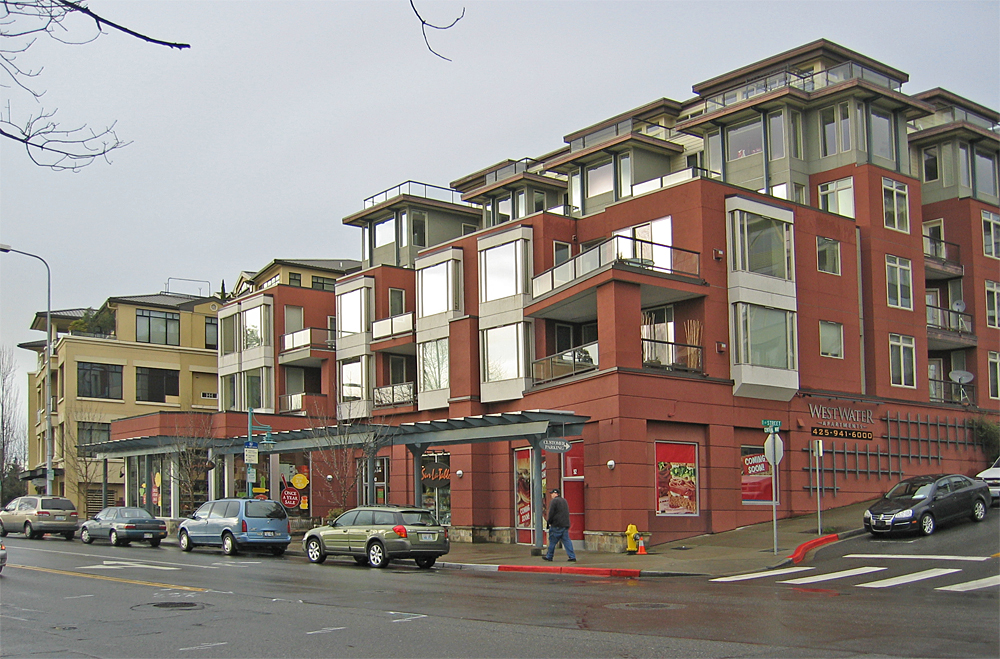
Apartment complex with retail and medical offices on ground floor, Kirkland, Washington

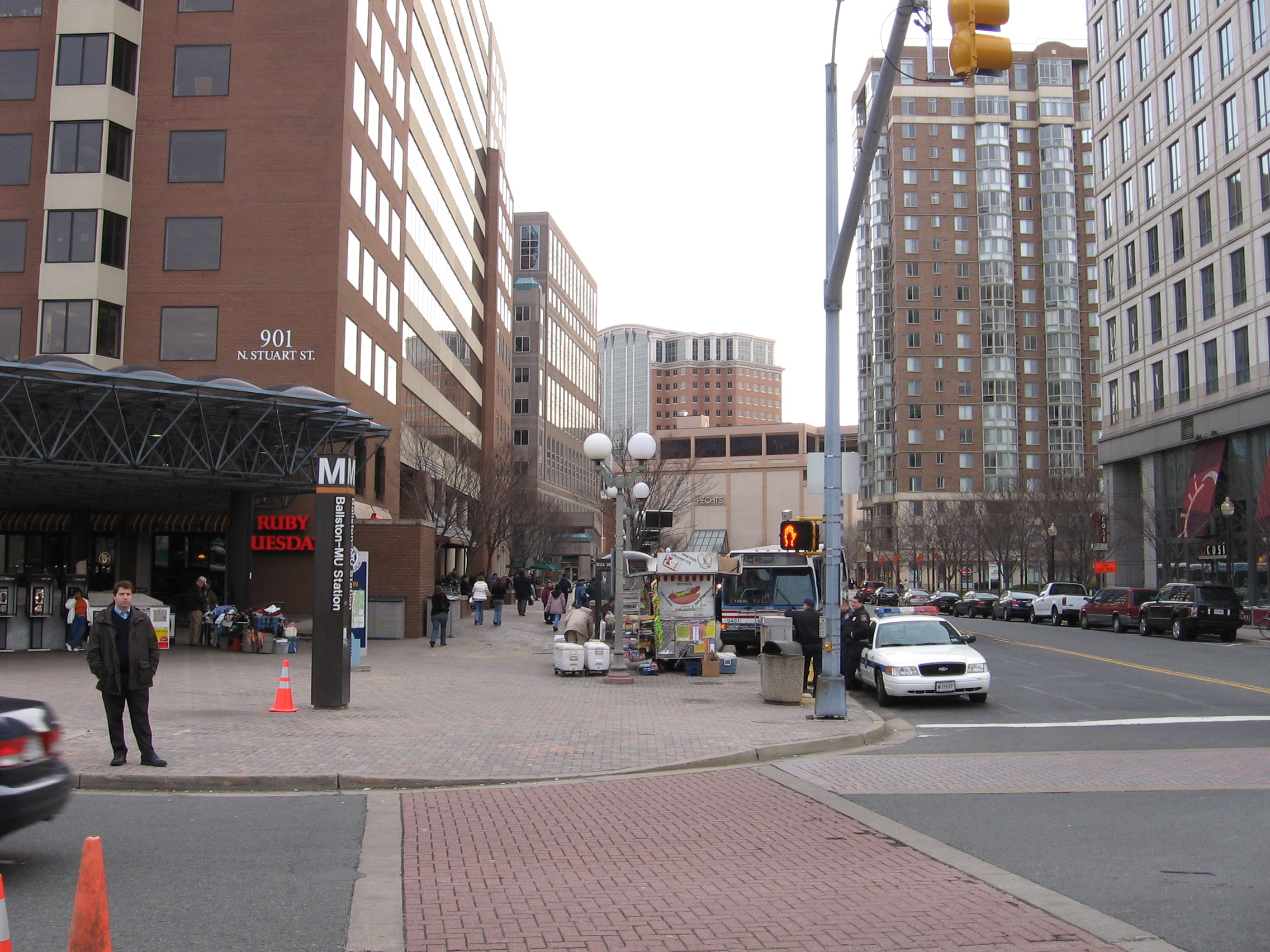
Ballston Quarter in Arlington, Virginia, part of the Baltimore-Washington metropolitan area, is transit-oriented, mixed-use and densified, giving a "downtown" feel in an edge city.

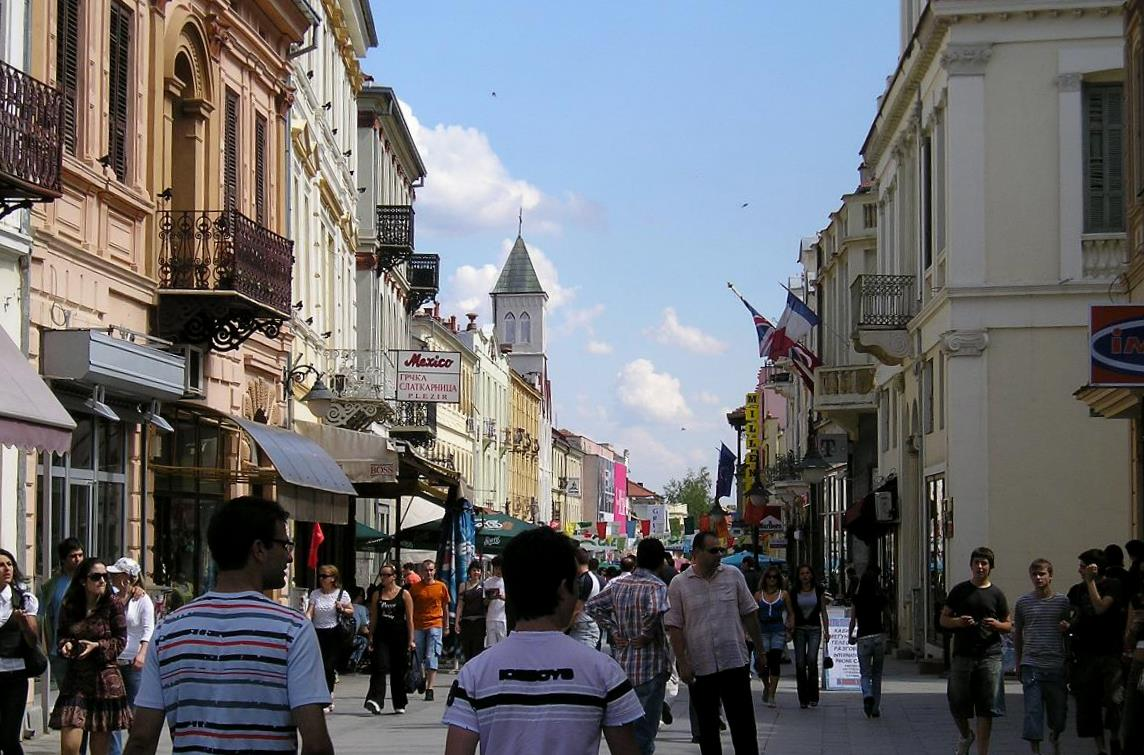
Traditional mixed-use development pattern in a city center: Bitola, North Macedonia

Mixed-use development is a type of urban development, urban design, urban planning and/or a zoning classification that blends multiple uses, such as residential, commercial, cultural, institutional, or entertainment, into one space, where those functions are to some degree physically and functionally integrated, and that provides pedestrian connections. Mixed-use development may be applied to a single building, a block or neighborhood, or in zoning policy across an entire city or other administrative unit. These projects may be completed by a private developer, (quasi-) governmental agency, or a combination thereof. A mixed-use development may be a new construction, reuse of an existing building or brownfield site, or a combination.

== Use in North America vs. Europe ==
Traditionally, human settlements have developed in mixed-use patterns. However, with industrialization, governmental zoning regulations were introduced to separate different functions, such as manufacturing, from residential areas. Public health concerns and the protection of property values stood as the motivation behind this separation.

In the United States, the practice of zoning for single-family residential use was instigated to safeguard communities from negative externalities, including air, noise, and light pollution, associated with heavier industrial practices. These zones were also constructed because of racial and class tensions.

The heyday of separate-use zoning in the United States came after World War II when planner and New York City Parks Commissioner, Robert Moses, championed superhighways to break up functions and neighborhoods of the city. The antithesis to these practices came from activist and writer, Jane Jacobs, who was a major proponent of mixed-use zoning, believing it played a key role in creating an organic, diverse, and vibrant streetscape. These two figures went head-to-head during much of the 1960s. Since the 1990s, mixed-use zoning has once again become desirable as it works to combat urban sprawl and increase economic vitality.

In most of Europe, government policy has encouraged the continuation of the city center's role as a main location for business, retail, restaurant, and entertainment activity, unlike in the United States where zoning actively discouraged such mixed use for many decades. In England, for example, hotels are included under the same umbrella as "residential," rather than commercial as they are classified under in the US. France similarly gravitates towards mixed-use as much of Paris is simply zoned to be "General Urban," allowing for a variety of uses. Even zones that house the mansions and villas of the aristocrats focus on historical and architectural preservation rather than single family zoning. Single family zoning is also absent in Germany and Russia where zoning codes make no distinction between different types of housing.

America's attachment to private property and the traditional 1950s suburban home, as well as deep racial and class divides, have marked the divergence in mixed-use zoning between the continents. As a result, much of Europe's central cities are mixed use "by default" and the term "mixed-use" is much more relevant regarding new areas of the city where an effort is made to mix residential and commercial activities – such as in Amsterdam's Eastern Docklands.

== Contexts ==
Expanded use of mixed-use zoning and mixed-use developments may be found in a variety of contexts, such as the following (multiple such contexts might apply to one particular project or situation):

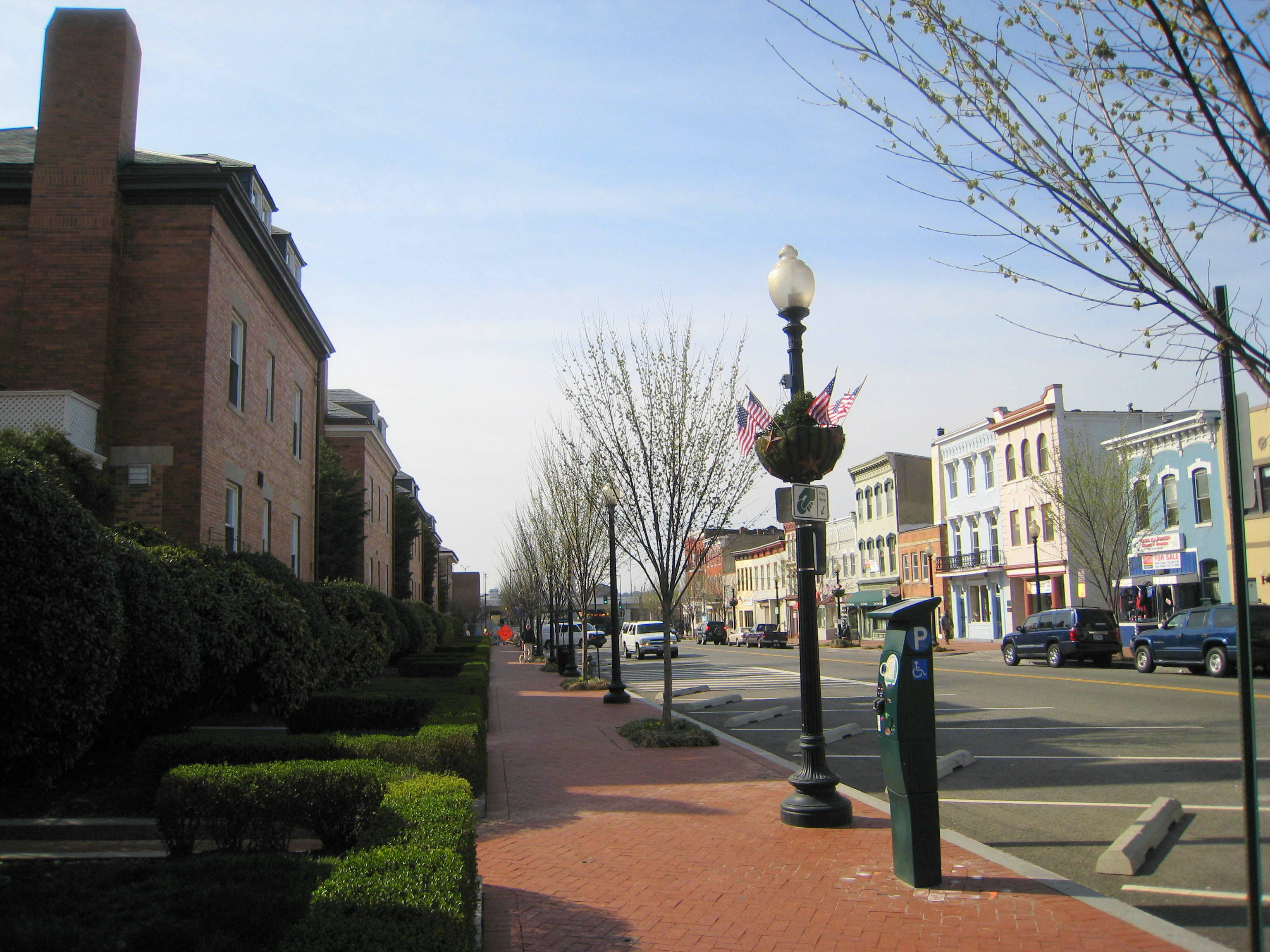
Barracks Row in Washington, D.C.; ground-level retail with upper-story residential.

- as part of smart growth planning strategies
- in traditional urban neighborhoods, as part of urban renewal and/or infill, i.e., upgrading the buildings and public spaces and amenities of the neighborhood to provide more and/or better housing and a better quality of life—examples include Barracks Row in Washington, D.C., and East Liberty, Pittsburgh
- in traditional suburbs, adding one or more mixed-use developments to provide a new or more prominent "downtown" for the community–examples include new projects in downtown Bethesda, Maryland, an inner suburb of Washington, D.C., and the Excelsior & Grand complex in St. Louis Park, Minnesota, an inner suburb of Minneapolis
- greenfield developments, i.e., new construction on previously undeveloped land, particularly at the edge of metropolitan areas and in their exurbs, often as part of creating a relatively denser center for the community—an edge city, or part of one, zoned for mixed use, in the 2010s often labeled "urban villages" (examples include Avalon in Alpharetta, Georgia, and Halcyon in Forsyth County, Georgia, at the edge of the Atlanta metropolitan area)
- the repurposing of shopping malls and intensification of development around them, particularly as many shopping malls' retail sales, and ability to rent space to retailers, decrease as part of the 2010s retail apocalypse

Any of the above contexts may also include parallel contexts such as:

- Transit-oriented development—for example in Los Angeles and San Diego, where the cities made across-the-board zoning law changes permitting denser development within a certain distance of certain types of transit stations, with the primary aim of increasing the amount and affordability of housing
- Older cities such as Chicago and San Francisco have historic preservation policies that sometimes offer more flexibility for older buildings to be used for purposes other than what they were originally zoned for, with the aim of preserving historic architecture

== Benefits ==
=== Economic ===
Mixed-use developments are home to significant employment and housing opportunities. Many of these projects are already located in established downtown districts, meaning that development of public transit systems is incentivized in these regions. By taking undervalued and underutilized land, often former heavy industrial, developers can repurpose it to increase land and property values. These projects also increase housing variety, density, and oftentimes affordability through their focus on multifamily, rather than single-family housing compounds. A more equal balance between the supply and demand of jobs and housing is also found in these districts.

=== Social ===
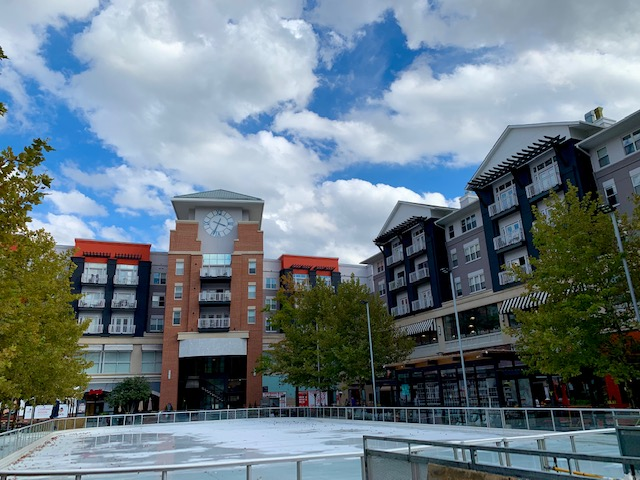
Apartments with ground floor retail and ice skating rink at Pentagon Row in Arlington, VA.

This development pattern is centered around the idea of "live, work, play," transforming buildings and neighborhoods into multi-use entities. Efficiency, productivity, and quality of life are also increased with regards to workplaces holding a plethora of amenities. Examples include gyms, restaurants, bars, and shopping. Mixed-use neighborhoods promote community and socialization through their bringing together of employees, visitors, and residents. A distinctive character and sense-of-place is created by transforming single use districts that may run for eight hours a day (ex. commercial office buildings running 9am - 5pm) into communities that can run eighteen hours a day through the addition of cafes, restaurants, bars, and nightclubs. Safety of neighborhoods in turn may be increased as people stay out on the streets for longer hours.

=== Environmental ===
Mixed-use neighborhoods and buildings have a strong ability to adapt to changing social and economic environments. When the COVID-19 pandemic hit, New York retailers located on long, commercially oriented blocks suffered severely as they were no longer attracting an audience of passersby. By combining multiple functions into one building or development, mixed-use districts can build resiliency through their ability to attract and maintain visitors.

More sustainable transportation practices are also fostered. A study of Guangzhou, China, done by the Journal of Geographical Information Science, found that taxis located in regions where buildings housed a greater variety of functions had greatly reduced traveling distances. Shorter traveling distances, in turn, support the use of micro-mobility. Pedestrian and bike-friendly infrastructure are fostered due to increased density and reduced distances between housing, workplaces, retail businesses, and other amenities and destinations. Additionally, mixed-use projects promote health and wellness, as these developments often provide better access (whether it be by foot, bicycle, or transit) to farmer's markets and grocery stores. However, hybrid metropolises, areas that have large and tall buildings which accommodate a combination of public and private interests, do not show a decrease in carbon emissions in comparison to metropolitan areas that have a low, dense configuration. This is possibly because hybrid metropolises are prone to attract car traffic from visitors.

== Drawbacks ==
=== Equity ===
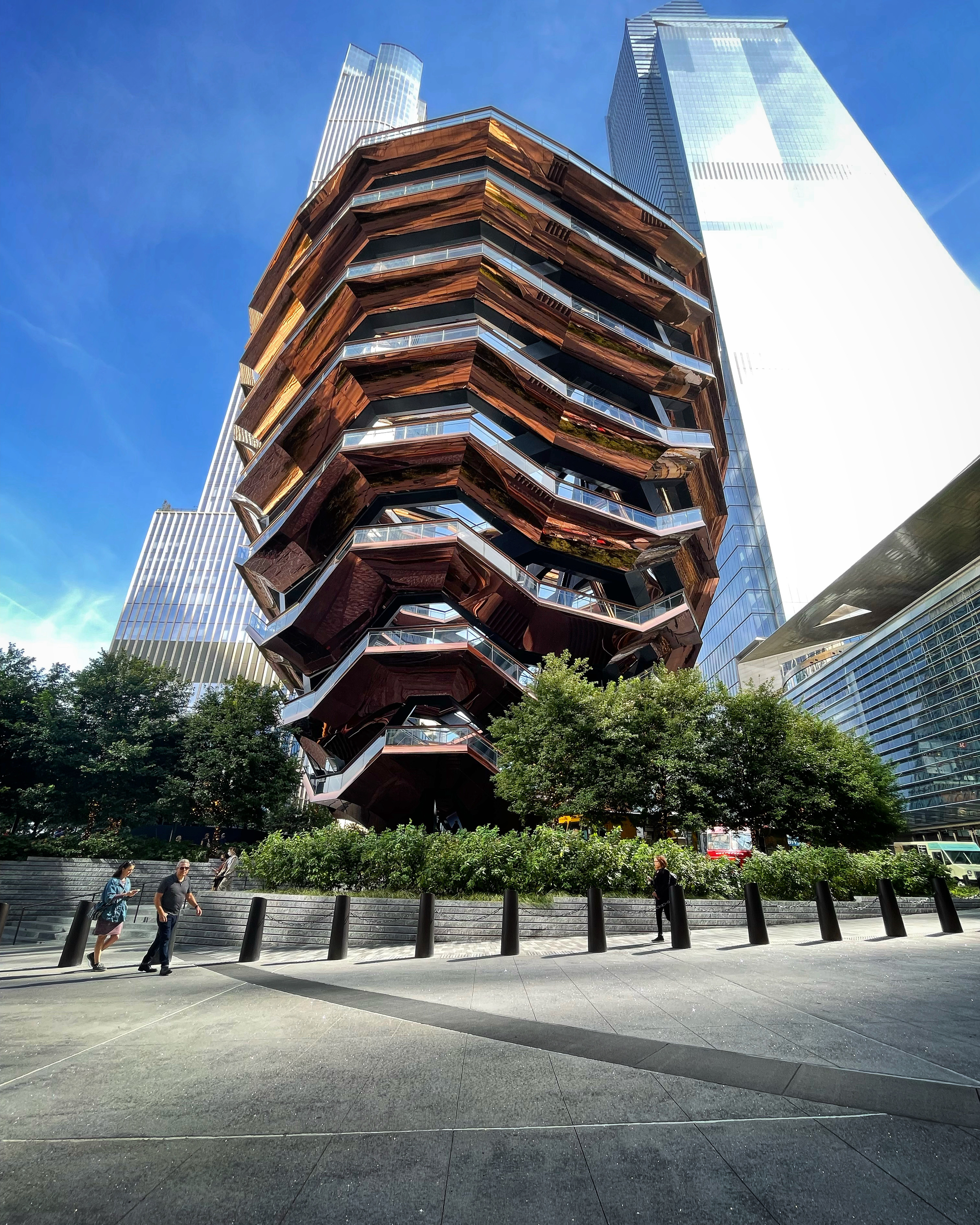
"Vessel", a tourist attraction in the mixed-use neighborhood of Hudson Yards, New York

Due to the speculative nature of large scale real estate developments, mega-mixed-use projects often fall short on meeting equity and affordability goals. High-end residential, upscale retail, and Class A office spaces appealing to high-profile tenants are often prioritized due to their speculative potential. There is also a trend towards making residential spaces in mixed-use developments to be condominiums, rather than rental spaces. A study done by the Journal of the American Planning Association found that a focus on homeownership predominantly excludes individuals working in public services, trades, cultural, sales and service, and manufacturing occupations from living in amenity-rich city centers. Despite incentives like density bonuses, municipalities and developers rarely put a significant focus on affordable housing provisions in these plans.

=== Financing ===
Mixed-use buildings can be risky given that there are multiple tenants residing in one development. Mega-mixed-use projects, like Hudson Yards, are also extremely expensive. This development has cost the City of New York over 2.2 billion dollars. Critics argue that taxpayer dollars could better serve the general public if spent elsewhere. Additionally, mixed-use developments, as a catalyst for economic growth, may not serve their intended purpose if they simply shift economic activity, rather than create it. A study done by Jones Lang LaSalle Incorporated (JLL) found that "90 percent of Hudson Yards' new office tenants relocated from Midtown."

== Types of contemporary mixed-use zoning ==
Some of the more frequent mixed-use scenarios in the United States are:

- Neighborhood commercial zoning – convenience goods and services, such as convenience stores, permitted in otherwise strictly residential areas
- Main Street residential/commercial – two to three-story buildings with residential units above and commercial units on the ground floor facing the street
- Urban residential/commercial – multi-story residential buildings with commercial and civic uses on ground floor
- Office convenience – office buildings with small retail and service uses oriented to the office workers
- Office/residential – multi-family residential units within office building(s)
- Shopping mall conversion – residential and/or office units added (adjacent) to an existing standalone shopping mall
- Retail district retrofit – retrofitting of a suburban retail area to a more village-like appearance and mix of uses
- Live/work – residents can operate small businesses on the ground floor of the building where they live
- Studio/light industrial – residents may operate studios or small workshops in the building where they live
- Hotel/residence – mix hotel space and high-end multi-family residential
- Parking structure with ground-floor retail
- Single-family detached home district with standalone shopping center

== Examples of cities' mixed-use planning policies ==
=== Australia ===
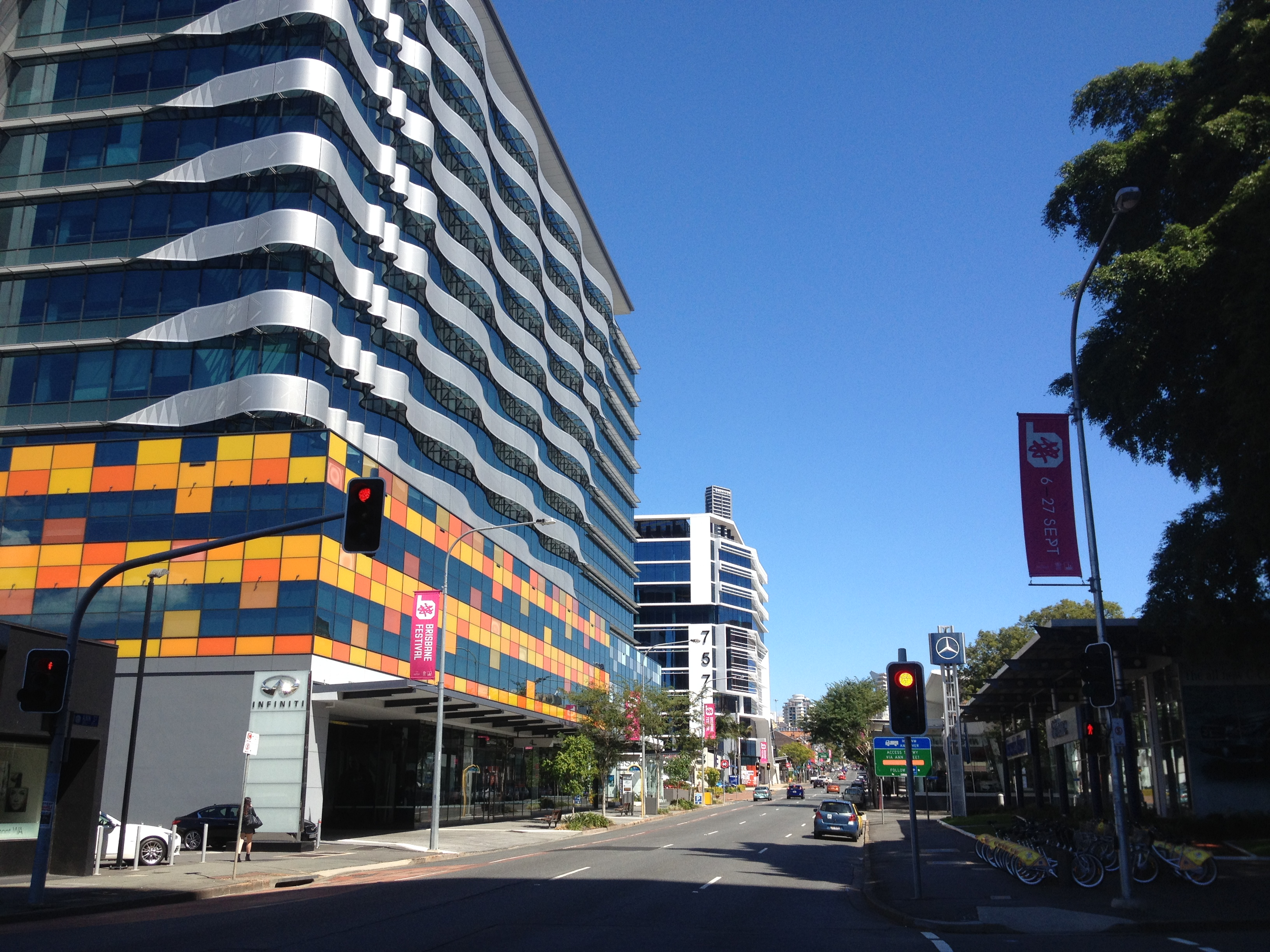
Mixed-use developments in Fortitude Valley, Queensland

The first large-scale attempt to create mixed-use development in Australia was the Sydney Region Outline Plan, a plan that identified Sydney's need to decentralise and organise its growth around the metropolitan area. Its main objective was to control the city's rapid post-war population growth by introducing growth corridors and economic centres that would help prevent uncontrolled sprawl and the overuse of the car as a means of transport Several city centres such as Parramatta or Campbelltown benefited from these policies, creating economic hubs with its own inner-city amenities along Sydney's main thoroughfares.

Subsequent plans complemented the initial one with new policies focused on economic and urban renewal issues. In particular, the 1988 Plan was designed in collaboration with a transport strategy and was the first to recommend higher development densities. Since then, Australian planning authorities have given greater priority to mixed-use development of inner-city industrial land as a way of revitalising areas neglected by the decline in manufacturing, consolidating and densifying the previously underpopulated urban centres. This new urban planning approach has had a significant impact on the use of land parcels in major Australian cities: according to 2021 data from Australian Bureau of Statistics, mixed zoning already suppose more than 9% of new housing approvals.

=== Canada ===
One of the first cities to adopt a policy on mixed-use development is Toronto. The local government first played a role in 1986 with a zoning bylaw that allowed for commercial and residential units to be mixed. At the time, Toronto was in the beginning stages of planning a focus on developing mixed-use development due to the growing popularity of more social housing. The law has since been updated as recently as 2013, shifting much of its focus outside the downtown area which has been a part of the main city since 1998. With the regulations in place, the city has overseen the development of high-rise condominiums throughout the city with amenities and transit stops nearby. Toronto's policies of mixed-use development have inspired other North American cities in Canada and the United States to bring about similar changes.

One example of a Toronto mixed-use development is Mirvish Village by architect Gregory Henriquez. Located at Bloor and Bathurst Street, a significant intersection in Toronto, portions of the Mirvish Village project site are zoned as "commercial residential" and others as "mixed commercial residential". Within the City of Toronto's zoning by-laws, commercial residential includes "a range of commercial, residential and institutional uses, as well as parks." Mirvish Village's programmatic uses include rental apartments, a public market, and small-unit retail, while also preserving 23 of 27 heritage houses on site. The project is notable for its public consultation process, which was lauded by Toronto city officials. Architect Henriquez and the developer had previously collaborated on mixed-use projects in Vancouver, British Columbia, including the successful Woodward's Redevelopment.

=== United States ===
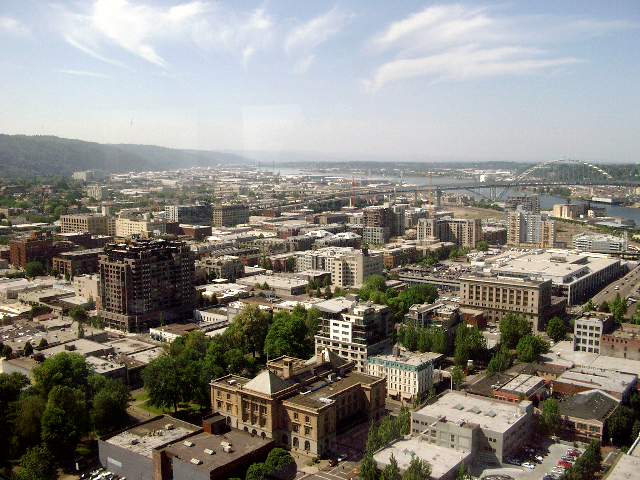
Mixed-use spaces developed in Portland, Oregon

In the United States, the Environmental Protection Agency (EPA) collaborates with local governments by providing researchers developing new data that estimates how a city can be impacted by mixed-use development. With the EPA putting models in the spreadsheet, it makes it much easier for municipalities, and developers to estimate the traffic, with Mixed-use spaces. The linking models also used as a resource tool measures the geography, demographics, and land use characteristics in a city. The Environmental Protection Agency has conducted an analysis on six major metropolitan areas using land usage, household surveys, and GIS databases. States such as California, Washington, New Mexico, and Virginia have adopted this standard as statewide policy when assessing how urban developments can impact traffic. Preconditions for the success of mixed-use developments are employment, population, and consumer spending. The three preconditions ensure that a development can attract quality tenants and financial success. Other factors determining the success of the mixed-use development is the proximity of production time, and the costs from the surrounding market.

==== Portland ====
Mixed-use zoning has been implemented in Portland, Oregon, since the early 1990s, when the local government wanted to reduce the then-dominant car-oriented development style. The Metropolitan Area Express, Portland's light rail system, encourages the mixing of residential, commercial, and work spaces into one zone. With this one-zoning-type planning system, the use of land at increased densities provides a return in public investments throughout the city. Main street corridors provide flexible building heights and high density uses to enable "gathering places".

==== Hudson Yards, NYC ====
Hudson Yards project is the US's largest project to ever be financed by TIF (tax increment financing) subsidies. It did not require voter approval, nor did it have to go through the city's traditional budgeting process. Rather, the project is financed by future property taxes and the EB-5 Visa Program. This program provides VISAs to overseas investors in exchange for placing a minimum of $500,000 into US real estate.

== See also ==
- Activity centre
- Automobile dependency
- Edge city
- Main Street
- New Urbanism
- Pedestrian village
- Principles of intelligent urbanism
- Public space
- Single-use zoning
- Smart growth
- Sustainable development
- Third Place
- Transit-oriented development
- Urban design
- Urban sprawl
- Urban vitality
- Zoning
