= Lambert High School =

Public high school in Suwanee, Georgia, United States

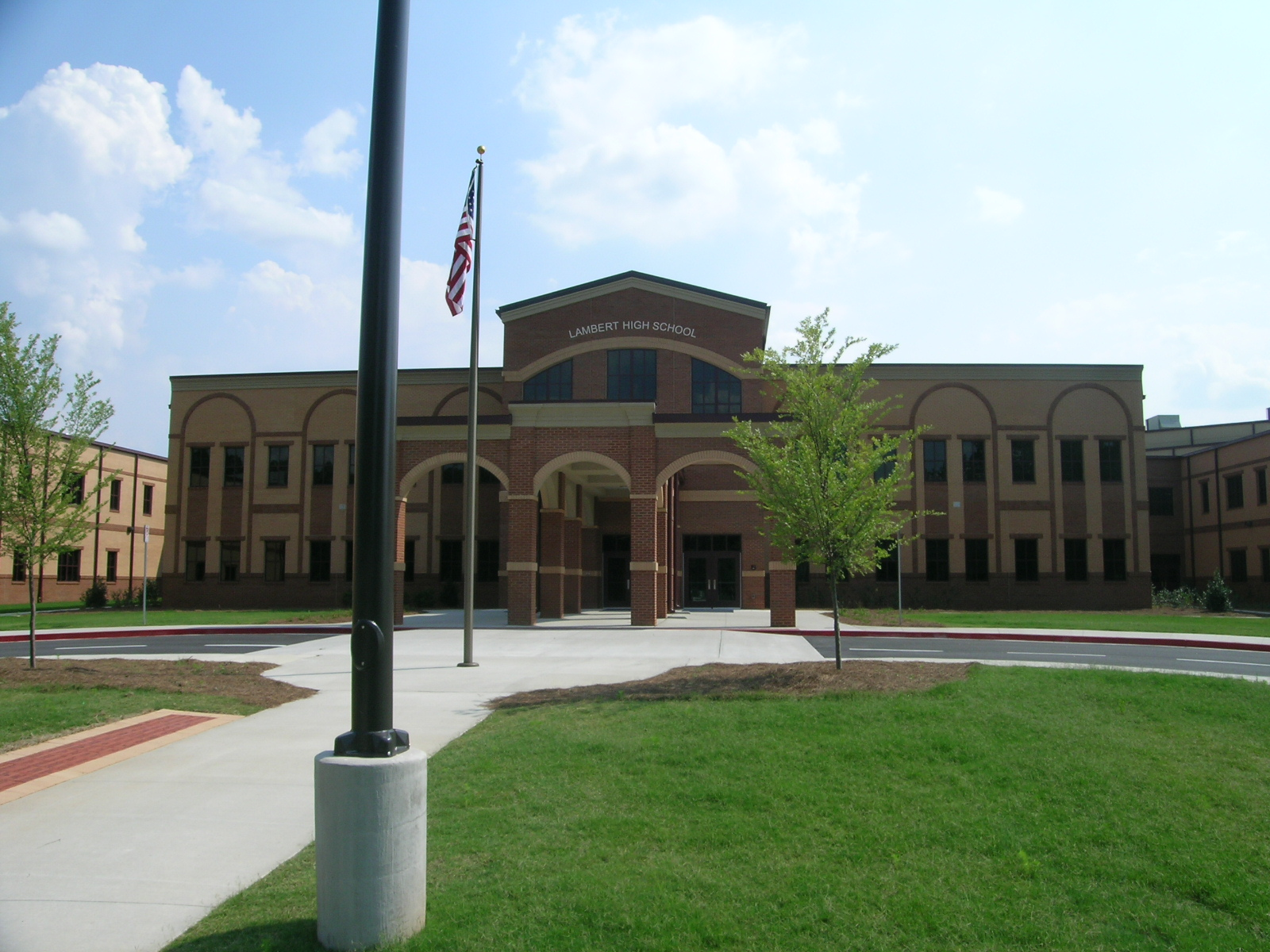
- Front of the school.

Location
- 805 Nichols Road; Suwanee, Georgia 30024; United States; 34°6′27.75″N 84°8′26.84″W

Information
- Type: Public high school
- Motto: Hook 'Em Horns
- Established: 2009
- School board: Forsyth County Board of Education
- School district: Forsyth County Schools
- NCES School ID: 130222003954
- Principal: Amanda Thrower
- Teaching staff: 166.70 (on an FTE basis)
- Grades: 9-12
- Enrollment: 3,249 (2024–2025)
- Student to teacher ratio: 19.49
- Colors: Crimson, black, and white
- Mascot: Longhorn
- Team name: Lambert Longhorns
- Newspaper: The Lambert Post
- Website: www.forsyth.k12.ga.us/lhs

Lambert High School is a public high school in Suwanee, in Forsyth County, Georgia, United States. It is the one of eight high schools in the Forsyth County School District. The school has an annual enrollment of about 3,000 students. Most students who attend Lambert reside in southern Forsyth County, an affluent area located between Johns Creek, Suwanee, and Cumming. Lambert was built to alleviate over-crowding at South Forsyth High School, which is located 3.8 miles away on Peachtree Parkway.

== History ==
=== Clarence Lambert ===
Lambert High School is named after Clarence Lambert. He was born in Birmingham, Alabama. He received degrees in vocational agriculture from University of Georgia and a master's degree in school administration from Alabama Polytechnic Institute, now Auburn University. He served as the first principal of Forsyth County High School, which is now called Forsyth Central High School. Lambert also worked at the Georgia Department of Education as a program coordinator, as Assistant Superintendent in charge of facilities at Forsyth County Schools, and as Interim Superintendent of Forsyth County Schools.

=== Foundation and continued operation ===
Lambert High School opened its doors ahead of the 2009-2010 school year with Gary Davison serving as the school’s principal.

During the 2020-21 school year, Lambert High School began a therapy dog program for special needs students, being the only school in the state of Georgia to currently do so. The school's first full-time therapy dog would be Duck, who was given to Lambert by Rucker Dog Training after he failed out of duck hunting school.

An addition is currently being constructed by Charles Beall Constitution Company, Inc.

In May 2023, the Forysth County Board of Education approved the school's request to name the semi-circle drive outside of the school's front entrance Will Davison Way. This was in honor of Gary Davison's late son, who died soon after the school's opening due to SIDS.

In August 2023, Amanda Thrower was named principal, replacing Gary Davison.

== Student data ==
Students are drawn from Riverwatch Middle School and South Forsyth Middle School.

=== Demographics ===
During the 2021–22 school year, Lambert had an enrollment of 2,941 students. The student body was 44.2% Asian, 42.7% White, 6.1% Hispanic, 3.8% Black, 3.0% Two or More Races, 0.2% Native American, and 0.1% Pacific Islander.

=== Student statistics ===
For the 2015–2016 school year, Lambert's Graduation Rate was 98.7%.

Lambert's class of 2016 had an average ACT composite score of 24.9, and an average SAT total (combined) score of 1627.

== Academic competitions ==
In 2011, Rocketry Team 2 won runner-up in the national Team America Rocketry Challenge with an overall score of 23. In 2022, Lambert's quizbowl team won the PACE National Scholastic Championship. Lambert iGEM was founded in 2012, and began competing in the 2013 iGEM season. In 2022, Lambert iGEM won the Grand Prize in the high school division for their project CADlock, which utilized miRNA to detect for Coronary Artery Disease.

== Athletics ==
Lambert competes in Region 6 of classification AAAAAAA, the largest classification in Georgia. The school is a member of the Georgia High School Association. Sports teams at Lambert include competitive cheerleading, cross country, football, softball, volleyball, basketball, swim and dive, wrestling, baseball, golf, lacrosse, soccer, tennis, track and field, fencing and gymnastics.

=== State championships ===
As of May 2018, Lambert has won a total of 24 team state championships. Lambert also won the Georgia Directors' Cup, awarded to the best overall athletics program in the state, in 2015, 2016, 2017, and 2020.

== Notable alumni ==
- Seth Beer – professional baseball player
- Kyle McCann - professional baseball player
