= Forsyth County Schools =

School district in Georgia (U.S. state)

Forsyth County Public Schools

Address
- 1120 Dahlonega Highway Cumming, Georgia, 30040; United States
- Coordinates: 34.23248°N 84.12358°W

District information
- Type: Public school district
- Motto: Quality Learning and Superior Performance for All
- Grades: Pre-kindergarten – 12
- Established: 1873
- Superintendent: James Mitchell Young
- Accreditations: Southern Association of Colleges and Schools; Georgia Accrediting Commission
- Schools: Elementary: 23; Middle: 11; High: 8
- Budget: $715 million

Students and staff
- Enrollment: 54,984 (2023–24)
- Faculty: 3,432.70 (FTE)
- Staff: 2,830.80 (FTE)
- Student–teacher ratio: 16.02

Other information
- Telephone: (770) 887-2461
- Website: forsyth.k12.ga.us

Forsyth County Schools (FCS) is a public school district in Forsyth County, Georgia, United States, based in Cumming. FCS serves over 55,000 students and is the largest employer in the county with over 8,000 full-time employees and substitutes. Out of 180 school districts, FCS is the fifth largest school system in Georgia.

== History ==
The district was established in 1873. At that time, there were a total of 1,456 students, with 114 being black or African American and 1,342 being white. The district's oldest school still in operation is Big Creek Elementary School built in 1939.

== Schools ==
There are 23 elementary, 11 middle and 8 high schools as of the 2024–2025 school year.

In Georgia, FCS has 10 National Blue Ribbon Schools, 12 Governor's Office of Student Achievement award-winning schools, is an Advanced Placement (AP) Honor Roll District, has the highest credit rating from Moody's and SP (1 of 17 in the U.S.) and the highest SAT score. Among Metro Atlanta and large districts, FCS has the highest ACT score, highest CCRPI score, highest county graduation rate (94%) and the highest financial efficiency rating (5/5 stars).

FCS provides learning opportunities for students, including the opportunity to earn high school credit in middle school, AP credits and college dual enrollment courses in high school, the STEM Academy at Forsyth Central High School, and an International Baccalaureate program at South Forsyth High School. The district was the first in Georgia to make up inclement weather days with online learning.

High schools:

- Alliance Academy for Innovation
- Denmark
- East Forsyth
- Forsyth Central
- Lambert
- North Forsyth
- South Forsyth
- West Forsyth

Middle schools:

- DeSana
- Hendricks
- Lakeside
- Liberty
- Little Mill
- North Forsyth
- Otwell
- Piney Grove
- Riverwatch
- South Forsyth
- Vickery Creek

Elementary schools:

- Big Creek
- Brandywine
- Brookwood
- Chattahoochee
- Chestatee
- Coal Mountain
- Cumming
- Daves Creek
- Haw Creek
- Johns Creek
- Kelly Mill
- Mashburn
- Matt
- Midway
- New Hope
- Poole's Mill
- Sawnee
- Settles Bridge
- Sharon
- Shiloh Point
- Silver City
- Vickery Creek
- Whitlow

== Technology ==
FCS is internationally recognized for being a leader in instructional and operational technology. This includes 1:1 computing ratios and internal broadcasting systems in all schools, as well as each classroom being equipped with permanent interactive boards. All full-time teachers are provided notebook computers, email, and websites/social media tools, and each student in grades 6 and above are given a personal take-home Chromebook.

As of the fiscal year cycle 2025-2028, Forsyth County Schools Technology Services supports:

- Over 60,000 student Chromebooks
- Over 6,000 staff laptops
- 500 physical and virtual servers
- 125,000 unique wireless clients per day
- 2 enterprise-grade firewalls
- 1 petabyte of raw mass storage

Parents are provided with online communication tools, such as Infinite Campus, Linewize and Qustodio, so that they may monitor students' assignments and grades 24 hours a day. The district was among the first in the nation to utilize BYOT (Bring Your Own Technology), which allows students to bring their own technology to use in the classroom. All students and teachers use the online learning management system Canvas.

In addition, the district has implemented policies restricting student cellphone use during the school day. These measures are intended to minimize distractions, support academic focus, and promote responsible technology use within the learning environment.

== Administration ==
=== Board of education ===
The board of education is the governing body of the school system. Members are elected by the public to represent one of five districts to which they serve staggered four-year terms.

As of June 2025, the members of the board are:

- Wes McCall (District 1)
- Trisha Hoyes (District 2)
- Dorian Usherwood (District 3)
- Chris Grimes (District 4)
- Mike Valdes (District 5)

For 2025, Valdes serves as chair and McCall serves as vice-chair.

=== Superintendent ===
James Mitchell Young serves as the superintendent of Forsyth County Schools. He initially joined the district’s leadership team as deputy superintendent on June 1, 2021, before being appointed superintendent on July 1, 2024, succeeding Jeff Bearden.
