= Forsyth County Fire Department =

Fire department for Forsyth County, Georgia

Operational area
- Country: United States

Agency overview
- Established: 1972
- Annual calls: 17,917 (2024)
- Employees: 267 (2024)
- Annual budget: $38,327,165 (2024)
- Staffing: Career
- Fire chief: Chief Of Department Barry Head
- Motto: "Service through Tradition, Excellence, and Integrity"

Facilities and equipment
- Battalions: 2
- Stations: 14
- Engines: 14
- Trucks: 2
- Squads: 3
- Rescues: 2
- Ambulances: 11
- Wildland: 2
- Fireboats: 1
- Rescue boats: 1
- Light and air: 1

Website
- https://www.forsythco.com/FD

The Forsyth County Fire Department (FCFD) is the fire department for Forsyth County, Georgia. The department provides firefighting and emergency medical services countywide. The department is responsible for servicing an area of 224.6 square miles (581.7 km²) with over 280,000 residents. The department is led by Chief of Department Barry Head.

== History ==
The department was established in 1972 as the Forsyth County Fire Protection Committee, staffed by volunteers, before eventually evolving into an organized fire department in spring of 1988, hiring 30 full-time career firefighters, nicknamed the "dirty thirty".

== Stations and Apparatus ==
The Forsyth County Fire Department currently operates out of 14 fire stations, divided into two Battalions, with Battalion One covering the southern half of the county, and Battalion Two covering the northern half. The department also has a headquarters, training facility, and fleet building, which also contains the motor maintenance division. The department also has an ambulance contract with Central EMS

Fire Station Number	Engine Company	Truck Company	Medical Units (Central EMS)	Special Units	Chief Units	Battalion
1	Engine 1	Truck 1	Med 1	UTV 1	Battalion Chief 1	1
2	Engine 2		Med 2	Heavy Rescue 2, UTV 2		1
3	Engine 3		Med 3	Brush Truck 3, UTV 3		2
4	Engine 4		Med 4			2
5	Engine 5		Med 5			2
6	Engine 6	Truck 6	Med 6	Brush Truck 6		1
7	Engine 7			Tanker 7		2
8	Engine 8		Med 8			2
9	Engine 9			Tanker 9, Dive 9, Marine 9, Squad 9		2
10	Engine 10		Med 10			1
11	Engine 11		Med 11	Light & Air 11, Tanker 11, UTV 11		1
12	Engine 12		Med 12	Rescue 12, Squad 12, UTV 12	Battalion Chief 2	2
14	Engine 14					1
15	Engine 15		Med 15	Squad 15, Swiftwater 15		

== Former Stations ==
Fire Station 9 was replaced under the same number, the new Station 9 was officially opened on September 12, 2024. Fire Station 15, similarly to Station 9, was replaced by a newer facility under the same number.
