= Big Creek Greenway =

- Length: 8.0 miles (Roswell/Alpharetta) 9.6 miles (Forsyth)
- Location: Georgia, United States
- Trailheads: Cumming (north) to; Roswell (south)
- Use: Cycling and pedestrians
- Season: Year round
- Surface: Concrete
- Website: http://www.alpharetta.ga.us/government/departments/recreation-parks/facilities/big-creek-greenway

The Big Creek Greenway is a multi-use trail with two completed sections along Big Creek (formerly known as Vickery Creek) in the state of Georgia, United States. The first section begins at Big Creek Park in Roswell, GA and currently runs 8 miles (13 km) to Marconi Drive in Alpharetta. A second completed section of the trail begins in Forsyth County at McFarland Parkway and runs 11 miles (15.4 km). Once complete, the trail will be 12 feet (3.7 m) wide and traverse the cities of Roswell, Alpharetta and Cumming.

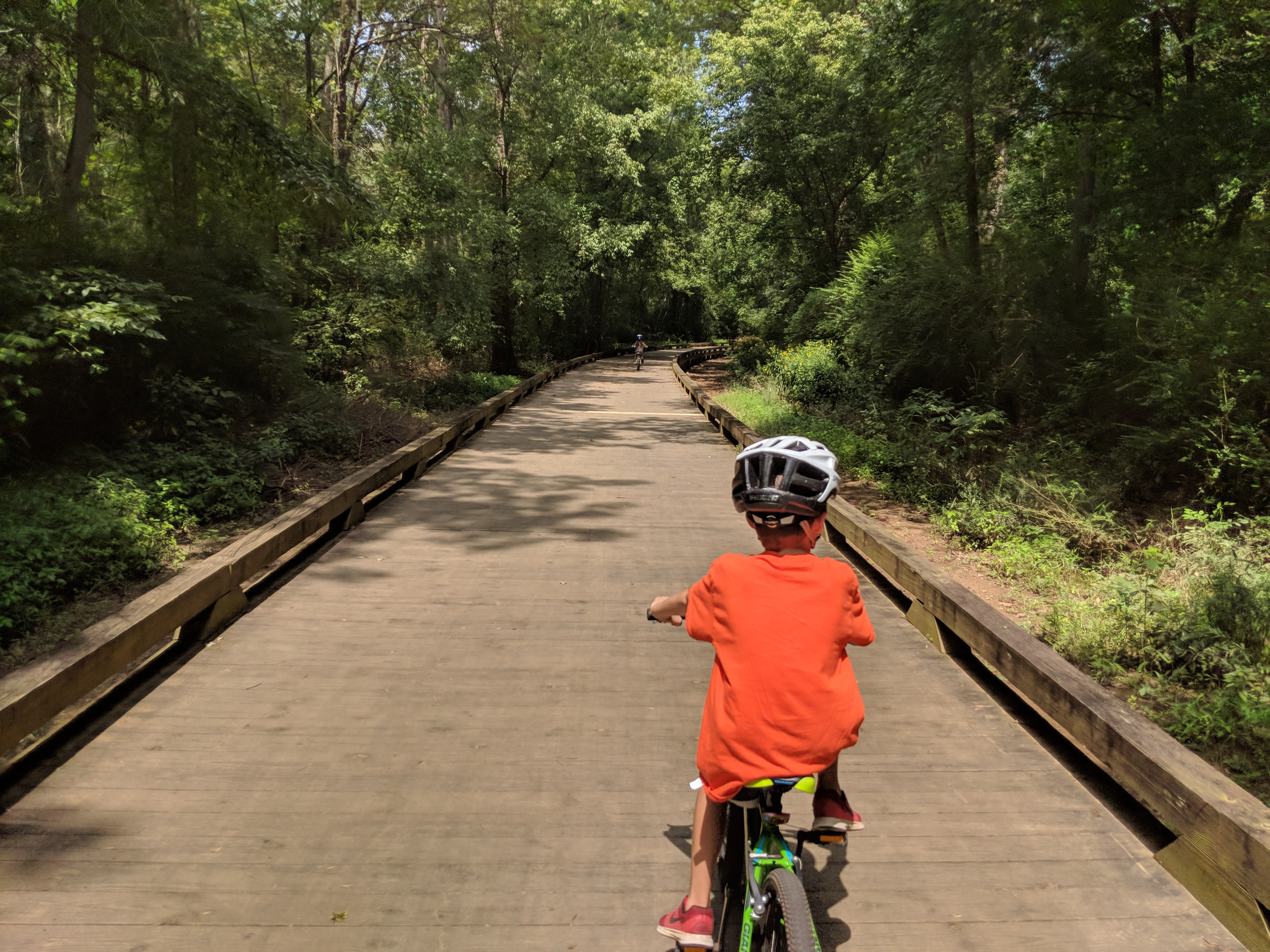

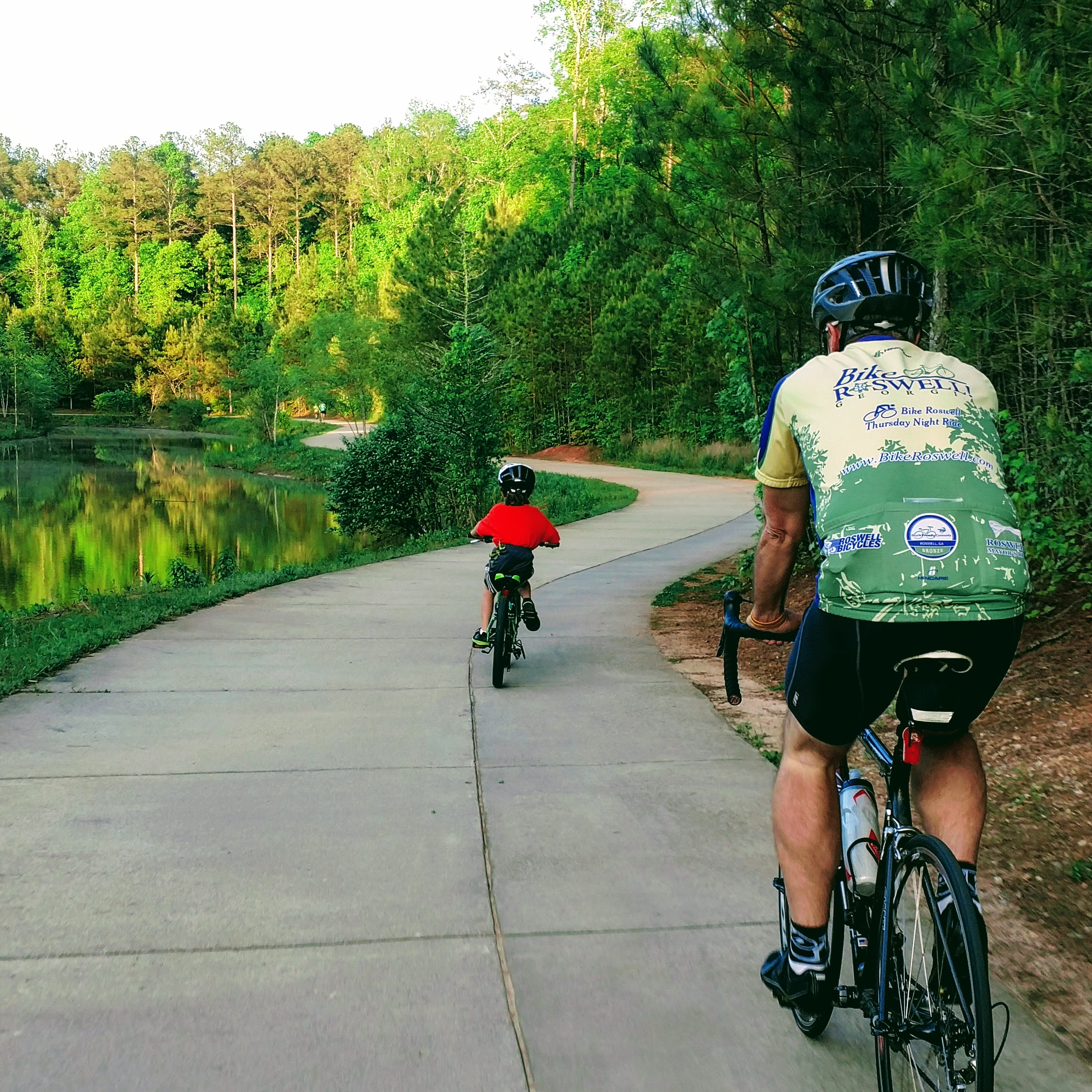
Section of Big Creek Greenway in Roswell, GA

== Access points ==
- Big Creek Park (Old Alabama Road, Roswell, GA)
- Barrington Farms Neighborhood (No Public Greenway Parking)
- Mansell Crossing (No Public Greenway Parking)
- North Point Parkway
- Rock Mill Park (Kimball Bridge Road, Alpharetta, GA)
- Haynes Bridge Road
- Old Milton Parkway (No Public Greenway Parking)
- Preston Ridge (Ed Isakson/Alpharetta YMCA)
- Marconi Drive
- 6265 Cortland Walk (Halcyon, Forsyth County)
- 5259 Union Hill Road (Forsyth County)
- 4110 Carolene Way (Fowler Park, Forsyth County)
- 5120 Bethelview Road (Forsyth County)
- 4075 Spot Road (Forsyth County)

== Bike Share ==
In 2016 the City of Alpharetta partnered with Zagster, Inc to provide free bike share for Big Creek Greenway users. Bikes can be rented for up to 3 hrs free of charge. Stations are now located at 4 stops along the Big Creek Greenway Bike program was discontinued in May 2020.

Locations:

- Big Creek Park (Roswell, GA)
- North Point Parkway - Greenway Parking Lot
- Rock Mill Park
- Ed Isakson YMCA

== Future expansion ==
=== Forsyth County ===
In December 2017, the Alpharetta City Council approved spending $407,425 to have its on-call engineering consultant design the Big Creek Greenway extension from the trail's current terminus at Marconi Drive north to Union Hill Park on the Fulton-Forsyth county line.

The trail design is expected to be completed 9 to 12 months after the notice to proceed.

=== Milton ===
The city of Milton is currently in the concept study phase of establishing a connection to the greenway.

== See also ==
- Cycling infrastructure
- 10-Minute Walk
- Smart growth
- Walkability
