= Drew, Georgia =

Unincorporated community in Georgia, U.S.

Coordinates: 34°12′30″N 84°13′11″W

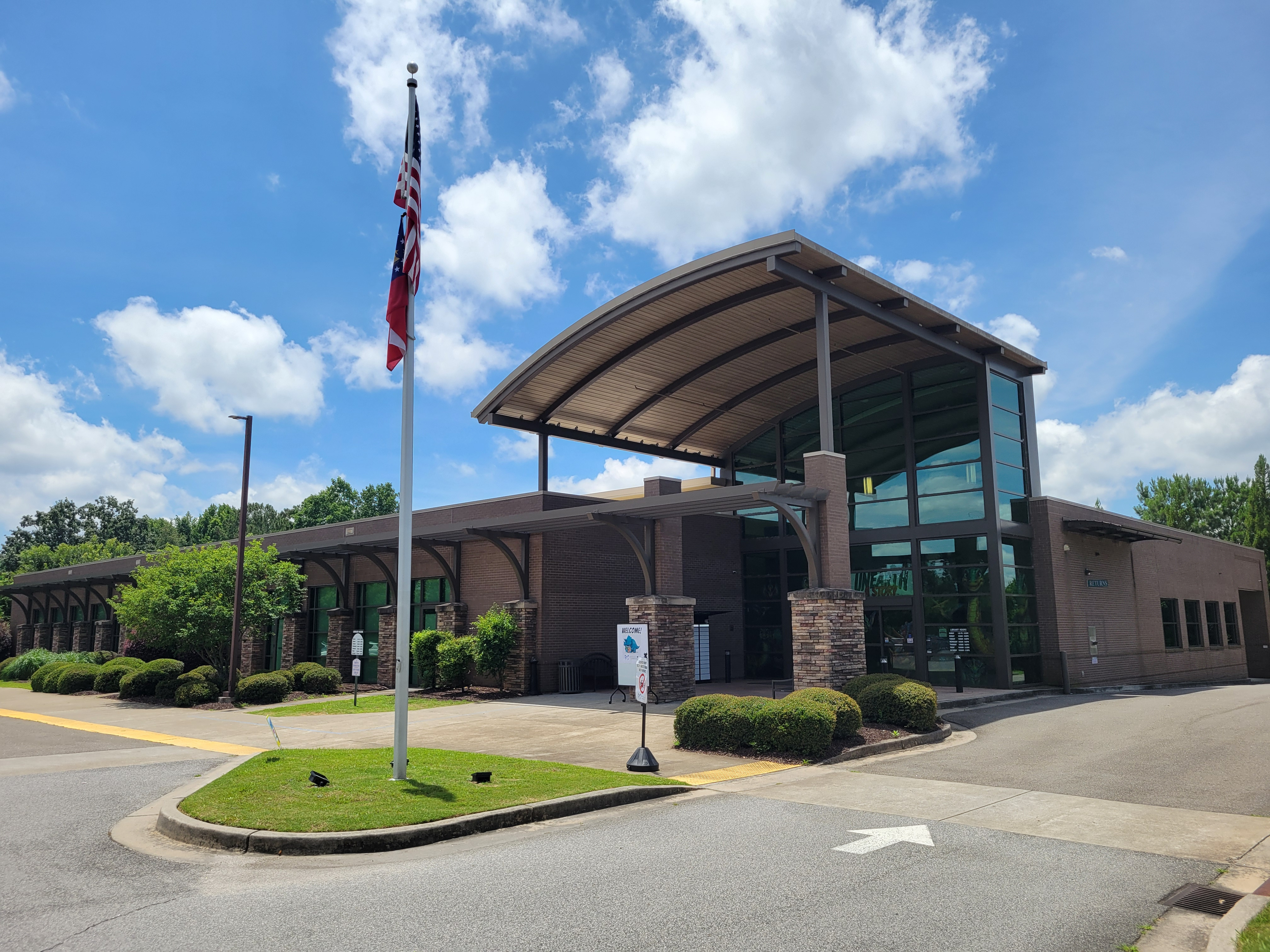
Post Road Library in the Drew Community

Drew is an unincorporated community in Forsyth County, in the U.S. state of Georgia.

== History ==
A post office called Drew was established in 1889 and remained in operation until 1904. Drew E. Bennett, an early postmaster, gave the community his first name.
