= East Forsyth High School (Georgia) =

Public school in Georgia, United States

Coordinates: 34°15′53.4″N 83°59′58.7″W

- 8910 Jot em Down Road, Gainesville, Georgia; 30506

Information
- School type: Public school
- Opened: July 14, 2021
- Sister school: Denmark High School
- School district: Forsyth County Schools
- Teaching staff: 94.60 (FTE)
- Grades: 9–12 thumb
- Enrollment: 1,590 (2023–2024)
- Capacity: 2125 students
- Student to teacher ratio: 16.81
- Campus size: 4.8 acres (1.9 ha)
- Colors: Navy Blue, Orange
- Mascot: Broncos
- Website: https://efhs.forsyth.k12.ga.us/
- Last updated: Wednesday, June 30, 2021

East Forsyth High School is a high school in northeastern Forsyth County, Georgia. Forsyth County Schools District hosted the grand opening of East Forsyth High School on July 14, 2021, at 10:30 am. The high school was built to relieve overcrowding in the district's North Forsyth High School and Forsyth Central High School. The school has been in development for more than a decade as of 2019. Forsyth County Schools officially broke ground on the project on May 21, 2018, tweeting "What a beautiful day for the groundbreaking ceremony at East Forsyth HS! Our 7th traditional high school is projected to open fall 2021."

Funds for the new school are to come from a $295,000,000 school bond approved by voters in May 2018.

East Forsyth has an entirely new and unique career development program, not found in any of the other schools in the district, to further enhance the educational opportunities for students.

In 2022, during the second school year since the school's founding, the principal, Jeff Cheney, was secretly recorded by a student and got caught saying the n-word, equating the word "cracker" to it. This caused an uproar in the community, leading him to leave the position that same school year.

== Design ==
Jennifer Caracciolo, director of communications for Forsyth County Schools explained that East Forsyth High School will be designed in a similar fashion to that of Denmark High School, the district's sixth traditional high school which opened in August 2018. The school will boast a navy and orange color scheme unlike any of the color combinations in any other Forsyth County Schools high school. The official school mascot will be the Broncos.

== East Forsyth High School sketch plat ==
The sketch plat for East Forsyth High School has been published.

== School features ==
East Forsyth High School will have a variety of features found in many of the district's schools.

Per the official sketch plat the school will include:

- 4 Tennis Courts
- 741 Total Parking Spaces
- 80 Yard Practice P.E. Field
- Football Stadium
- Baseball Field
- Fast pitch softball field
- 2.6 Acre P.E. Field
- Central courtyard with spots of turf and a sunken seating area to create a gathering space for students.
