= West Forsyth High School =

West Forsyth High School may refer to:

- West Forsyth High School (North Carolina) in Clemmons, North Carolina
- West Forsyth High School (Georgia) in Cumming, Georgia
