= Halcyon (Forsyth County, Georgia) =

Coordinates: 34.1114423°N 84.2260948°W

Halcyon is a mixed-use development in southern Forsyth County, Georgia, in the Atlanta metropolitan area. It has an Alpharetta postal address, despite not being located within the Alpharetta city limits or even in the same county. Halcyon is located at McFarland Parkway and Georgia State Route 400 (U.S. Route 19).

Halcyon opened its first phase in summer 2019 (Retail Sneak Peek date is set to September 18, 2019), and is planned to contain:

- Retail stores
- Restaurants
- The "Market Hall", a food hall
- "Cinebistro" cinema with in-cinema dining
- 300 market-rate apartments
- 160 rental units reserved for senior citizens
- 73 single-family houses
- 132 townhouses
- 480,000 square feet of retail and office space
- two hotels
- a Mercedes-Benz Experience Center
