= Forsyth County, Georgia =

County in Georgia, United States

- County
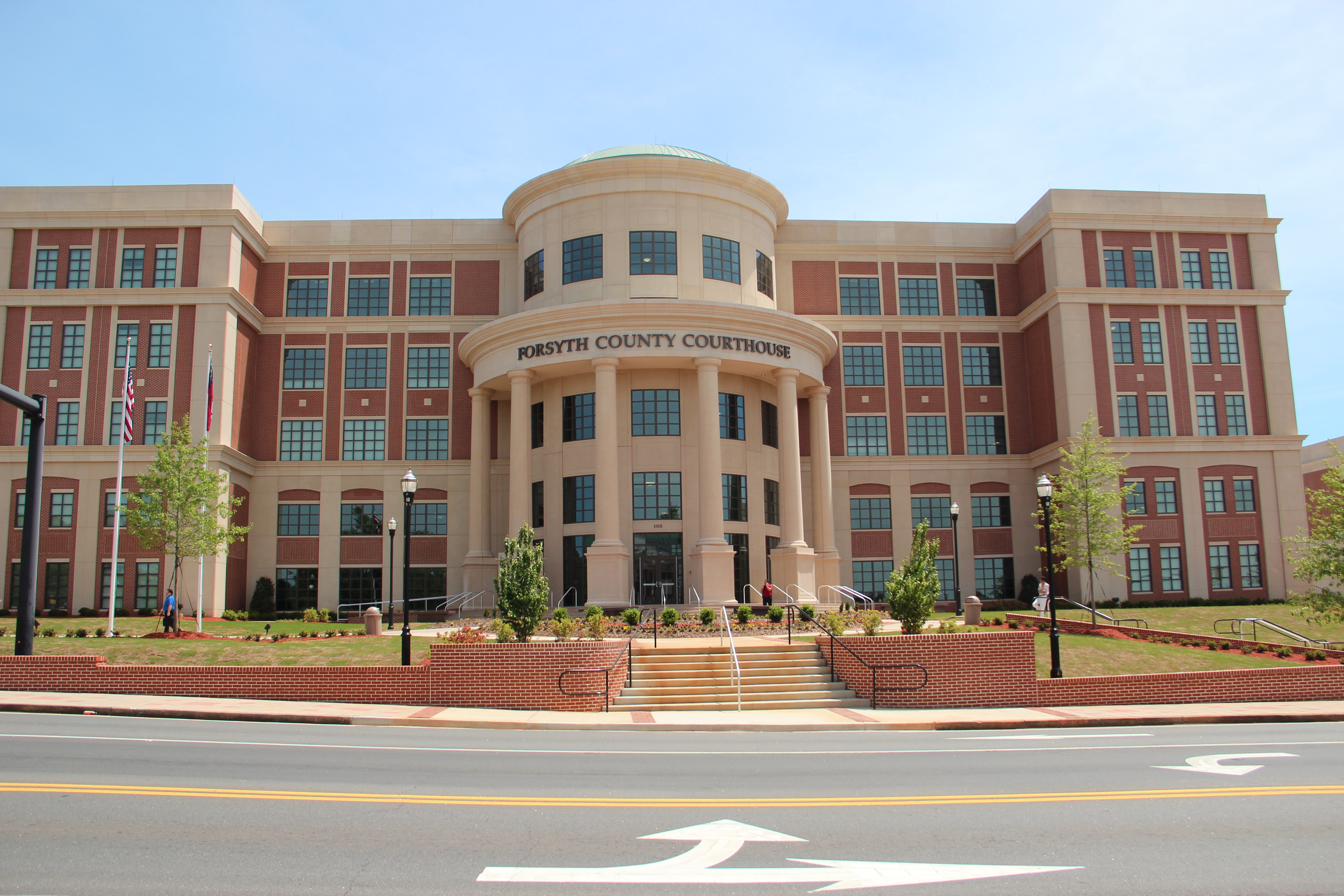
- Forsyth County Courthouse in Cumming

- Logo

- Location within the U.S. state of Georgia
- Coordinates: 34°13′N 84°08′W
- Country: United States
- State: Georgia
- Founded: December 3, 1831; 194 years ago
- Named for: John Forsyth
- Seat: Cumming
- Largest city: Big Creek CCD

Area
  - Total: 247 sq mi (640 km^{2})
  - Land: 224 sq mi (580 km^{2})
  - Water: 23 sq mi (60 km^{2}) 9.4%

Population (2020)
  - Total: 251,283
  - Estimate (2025): 282,805 ▲
  - Density: 1,120/sq mi (433/km^{2})
- Time zone: UTC−5 (Eastern)
  - Summer (DST): UTC−4 (EDT)
- ZIP Codes: 30024, 30040, 30041, 30004, 30506, 30005, 30028
- Congressional district: 6th
- Website: forsythco.com

Forsyth County (/fɔːrˈsaɪθ/ for-SYTHE or /ˈfɔːrsaɪθ/ FOR-sythe) is a county in the Northeast region of the U.S. state of Georgia. Suburban and exurban in character, Forsyth County lies within the Atlanta metropolitan area. The county's only incorporated city and county seat is Cumming. At the 2020 census, the population was 251,283. Forsyth was the fastest-growing county in Georgia and the 15th fastest-growing county in the United States between 2010 and 2019. Forsyth County's rapid population growth can be attributed to its proximity to high-income employment opportunities in nearby Alpharetta and northern Fulton County, its equidistant location between the big-city amenities of bustling Atlanta and the recreation offerings of the scenic Blue Ridge Mountains, its plentiful supply of large, relatively affordable new-construction homes, and its highly ranked public school system. The influx of high-income professionals and their families has increased the county's median annual household income dramatically in recent years; at $112,834, Forsyth County was the wealthiest in Georgia and the 16th-wealthiest in the United States as of the 2020 census estimates.

In the 1980s, the county attracted national media attention as the site of large civil rights demonstrations and counter-demonstrations. Organizers hoped to dispel the county's image as a sundown county. During the 1987 Forsyth County protests officials kept peace with police officers and National Guard protecting the event as thousands of marchers protested the segregation in the county.

From 2007 to 2009, the county received national attention because of a severe drought. Water supplies for the Atlanta area and downstream areas of Alabama and Florida were threatened. This followed a more severe drought in 2007 and 2008, and flooding in 2009. Flooding occurred in 2013, and severe drought again in 2016. Georgia, Alabama and Florida have been in a tri-state water dispute since 1990 over apportionment of water flow from Lake Lanier, which forms the eastern border of the county and is regulated by the Army Corps of Engineers as a federal project.

== History ==
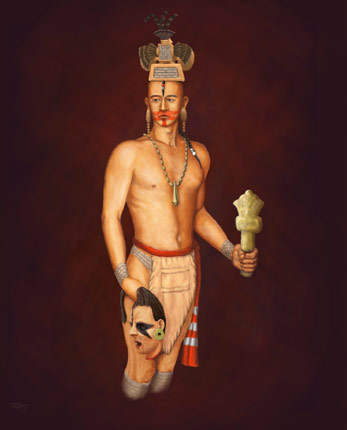
A Mississippian priest, with a ceremonial flint mace and severed head. Artist Herb Roe, based on a repoussé copper plate.

=== Before European contact ===
For thousands of years, varying indigenous cultures lived in this area along the Etowah River. Starting near the end of the first millennium, Mound Builders of the Mississippian culture settled in this area; they built earthwork mound structures at nearby Etowah in present-day Bartow County, and large communities along the Etowah River in neighboring Cherokee County. They disappeared about 1500 AD.

Members of the Iroquoian-speaking Cherokee Nation migrated into the area from the North, possibly from the Great Lakes area. They settled in the territory that would become Forsyth County and throughout upper Georgia and Alabama, also having settlements or towns in present-day Tennessee and western North Carolina.

=== 19th century ===
After the discovery of gold by European Americans in the surrounding area in 1829, numerous settlers moved into the area. They increased the pressure on the state and federal government to have the Cherokee and other Native Americans removed to west of the Mississippi River, in order to extinguish their land claims and make land available for purchase. The Cherokee were forced to relocate during what was called the Trail of Tears.

Forsyth County was named after John Forsyth, Governor of Georgia from 1827 to 1829 and Secretary of State under Presidents Andrew Jackson and Martin Van Buren. For many years, much of this hill country was farmed by yeomen farmers, who owned few or no slaves.

=== 20th century ===
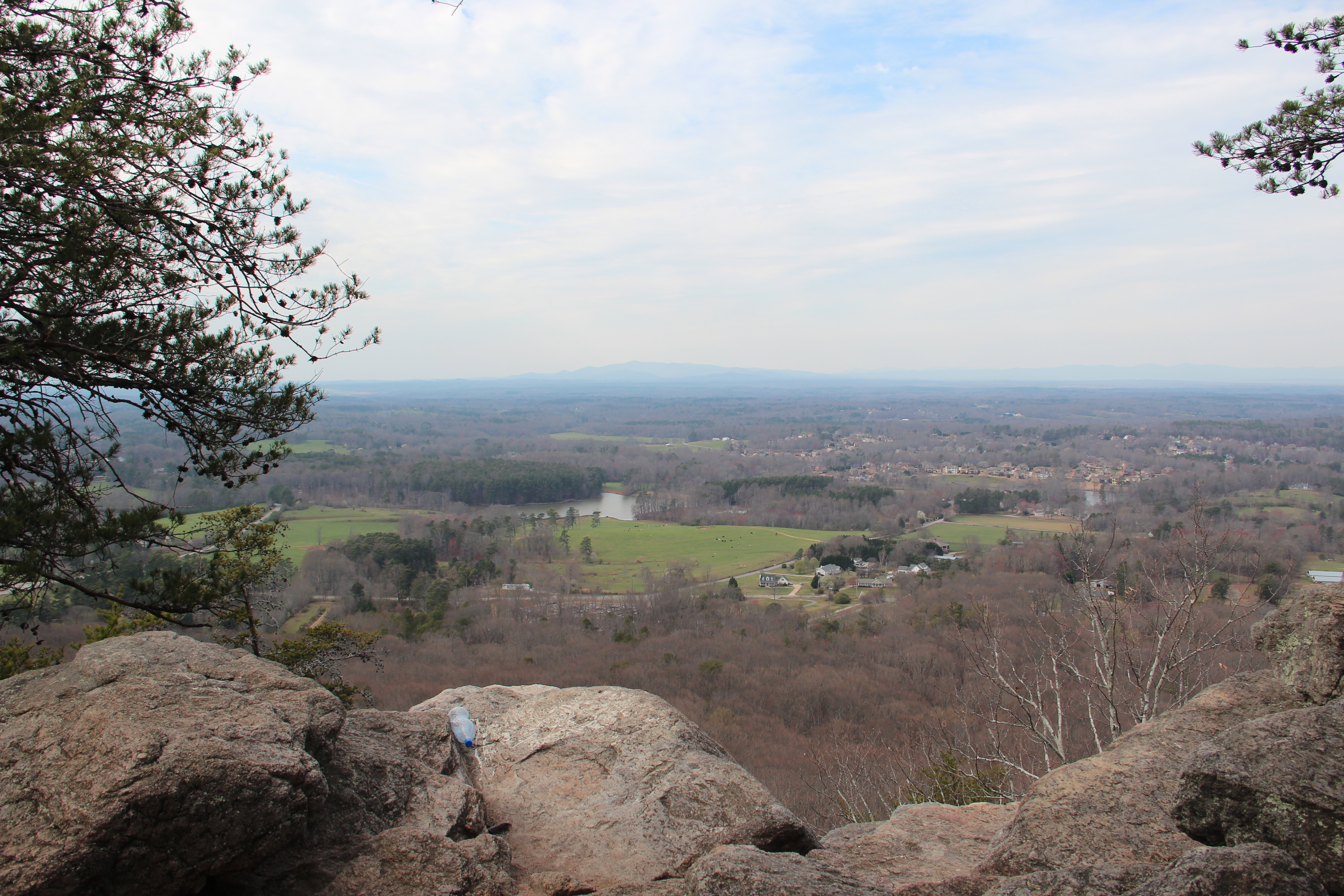
View of northern Forsyth County from Sawnee Mountain's Indian Seats

The county population of about 10,000 was 90 percent White in the early 20th century, and residents still depended on agriculture. Its more than 1,000 blacks included 440 persons classified as mixed race on the census, indicating a continuing history of racial mixing that dated to slavery times.

==== Lynching and other violence driving non-white people from the county ====
After two different incidents in September 1912, in which black men were alleged to have assaulted white women, tensions rose in the county.

In the first case, a woman claimed she awoke to find two black men in her bedroom. A black preacher was later assaulted by whites for making disparaging comments about the victim. The sheriff gained support from the governor, who sent more than 20 National Guard troops to keep peace. The suspects were never tried, for lack of evidence. In the second case, a white woman was attacked and raped, allegedly by black men; she later died of her injuries. A lynch mob stormed the Cumming county jail and dragged out one of the suspects, Rob Edwards. They shot him and hung his body in the town square. At trial in early October, two black youths under the age of 18 were quickly convicted by an all-white jury; they were executed by hanging later that month.

Afterward, whites harassed and intimidated blacks in Forsyth and neighboring counties. Within weeks, they forced most of the blacks to leave the region in fear of their lives, losing land and personal property that was never recovered.

Almost every single one of Forsyth's 1,098 African Americans — prosperous and poor, literate and unlettered — was driven out of the county. It took only a few weeks. Marauding residents wielded guns, sticks of dynamite, bottles of kerosene. Then they stole everything, from farmland to tombstones. Forsyth County remained white right through the 20th century. A black man or woman couldn't so much as drive through without being run out.... During the 1950s and '60s, there were no "colored" water fountains in the courthouse or "whites only" diners in the county seat, Cumming; there was no black population to segregate.

By 1987, the county was "all white". In 1997, African Americans numbered just 39 in a population of 75,739.

==== Later 20th century ====
During the 1950s, with the introduction of the poultry industry, the county had steady economic growth but remained largely rural and all white in population. Georgia State Route 400 opened in 1971 and was eventually extended through the county and northward; it stimulated population growth as residential housing was developed in the county and it became a bedroom community for people working in Atlanta, which had expanding work opportunities. The opening of Georgia State Route 400 also spurred industrial growth in the South West portion of the county along the McFarland Parkway corridor starting in the early 1970s.

By 1980, the county population was 27,500, growing to 40,000 in 1987. While some blacks worked in the county in new industries, none lived there. The county gained more than 30 new industries from 1980 and unemployment was low. Such growth resulted in the median income, formerly low, "rising faster than in any other county in Georgia." A small civil rights march by African Americans in the county seat of Cumming in January 1987 was attacked by people throwing rocks, dirt and bottles. A week later another, much larger march took place, with civil rights activists going from Atlanta to Cumming protected by police and the National Guard. Thousands of protesters joined a counter-demonstration. Local people said conditions had been improving for minorities, but whites appeared to be reacting to the march out of fear.

Residents of Forsyth County were featured on a 1987 episode of The Oprah Winfrey Show.

=== 21st century ===
Forsyth County continued to be developed for subdivisions, industry and related businesses. By 2008 it had been ranked for several years among the top ten fastest-growing counties of the United States. Many new subdivisions have been constructed, several around top-quality golf courses. The county's proximity to Atlanta and the Blue Ridge Mountains, and bordering 37,000-acre (150 km^{2}) Lake Sidney Lanier, has attracted many new residents. More than 60% of the current population either lived elsewhere in 1987 or had not yet been born.

The growth has put a strain on water supplies, especially during area droughts in the 21st century. Suburban growth has greatly increased water consumption in the area to maintain lawns and gardens, and supply new households. The region had severe droughts in 2007-2008 that threatened downriver water supplies in Alabama and Florida, in addition to Atlanta, in 2013 and in 2016. Bans on outdoor use of water were put in place, and the area has encouraged conversion of toilets and appliances to those that use less water. A severe drought in southern Forsyth County was declared by the end of June 2016. Several county organizations work to plan growth that can sustain the high quality of life in the area.

=== Racial history ===
The changing dynamics between white and black citizens after the Civil War resulted in tensions across the southern United States as whites tried to maintain dominance. They used violence to intimidate black voters and regain control of state legislatures, ending Reconstruction. At the turn of the 20th century, white Democrats dominated the Georgia legislature and passed laws increasing barriers to voter registration and voting, effectively disenfranchising most blacks in the state. Unable to vote, they were also excluded from juries. The white legislators passed racial segregation and other Jim Crow laws. Racial tensions increased as rural workers started to move to industrializing cities. Whites rioted against blacks in the 1906 Atlanta race massacre, resulting in more than 20 dead.

Racial violence broke out in Forsyth County in September 1912, following allegations of sexual attacks by black men of white women.

Forsyth County had a county population with a minority of ethnic African residents. The 1910 census recorded 10,847 white, 658 black, and 440 mulatto (mixed-race) residents, making the number of black citizens slightly more than 10% (as classified under the binary system of the South that classified all people of any African descent as Negro or black). They tended to work as sharecroppers, with some women working as domestic servants, and struggled with poverty.

In early September 1912 a white woman said she was the victim of an attempted rape by two black men, but they left before she was hurt. On September 7, 1912, police arrested five black men in connection with the assault, including Tony Howell and Isaiah Pirkle. That same afternoon members of numerous area black churches gathered for a barbecue just outside the county seat of Cumming. Preacher Grant Smith was heard to question the alleged victim's account, saying that perhaps she had been caught and had lied about what was actually a consensual relationship with a black man. (The mixed-race population in the county showed that whites and blacks had relationships; most were between white men and black or mixed-race women, which the whites tried to treat as a secret.) Whites horse-whipped Smith outside the courthouse, where he was rescued by police and taken into custody for his safety.

They locked him in the courthouse for safety. Rumors spread on both sides; whites said that the blacks threatened to dynamite the town. White residents gathered a lynch mob of 500 men (when Cumming had only 300 residents in total), with men coming to join from surrounding areas. They talked of lynching the black citizens held at the jail. By 1:30 p.m., the Sheriff deputized 25 men and called the Governor for help, who ordered in 23 National Guardsmen from nearby Gainesville, Georgia.

The next day, September 8, Mae Crow, a 19-year-old white woman, was allegedly attacked in a nearby community while walking to her aunt's house. She was allegedly pulled into the woods and assaulted. According to later testimony, she was allegedly raped by Ernest Knox, a 16-year-old black boy who worked as a hired hand at a neighbor's farm. Knox was said to have told friends about the incident: Oscar Daniel (17), his sister Trussie (Jane) Daniel (21), and her live-in boyfriend Rob Edwards (24), who also went to the scene. They left the girl, thinking she had died and being afraid to get involved. Crow was found the next day by a search party; whites said later that she had regained consciousness briefly and named Knox as her attacker, but no newspaper reported this. A small hand mirror found at the scene was recognized as belonging to Knox; police used it to connect him to the crime and arrested him that morning. Police said he confessed fully. Because of the trouble two days before in Cumming, they took Knox to the jail in Gainesville. Hearing threats of a lynch mob there, officials moved him to a jail in Atlanta.

The following day, Knox's friends were arrested in connection with the Mae Crow assault. Oscar Daniel and Rob Edwards were suspects in rape, and Trussie Daniel was held for not reporting the crime and as an accomplice. Ed Collins, a black neighbor, was picked up and held as a witness. They were detained in the small Cumming jail. The Atlanta Journal reported that Sheriff Reid drove through a mob of 2,000 people to get the suspects to the jail.

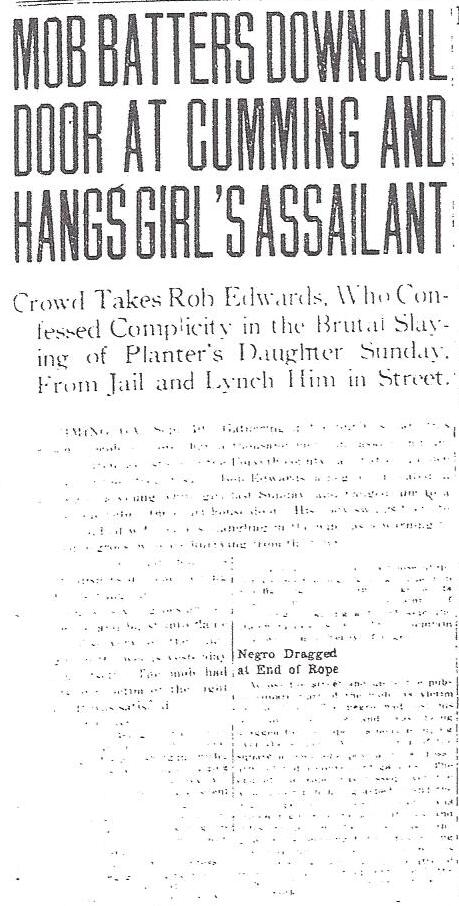
The Rob Edwards lynching made front-page news in all the Atlanta papers. Many newspapers first reported that Ed Collins was lynched because the body was so damaged that it could not be identified.

Within a few hours on September 9, the white mob increased to 4,000 people, who stormed the jail. Sheriff Reid was not there, having strategically left deputy Mitchell Lummus alone to protect the prisoners. Deputy Lummus hid most of them, but Rob Edwards was shot and killed by the mob while still in his cell. They dragged him out, mutilated him, and dragged his body behind a wagon, before hanging him from a telephone pole at the northwest corner of the Square. The coroner's inquest, held on September 18, 1912, found the cause of death to be a gunshot by an unknown assailant.

Crow died in the hospital two weeks later on September 23, 1912. The cause of death was listed as pneumonia. Knox and Daniel were indicted for rape and murder on September 30. Trussie Daniel and Ed Collins were both charged as accomplices.

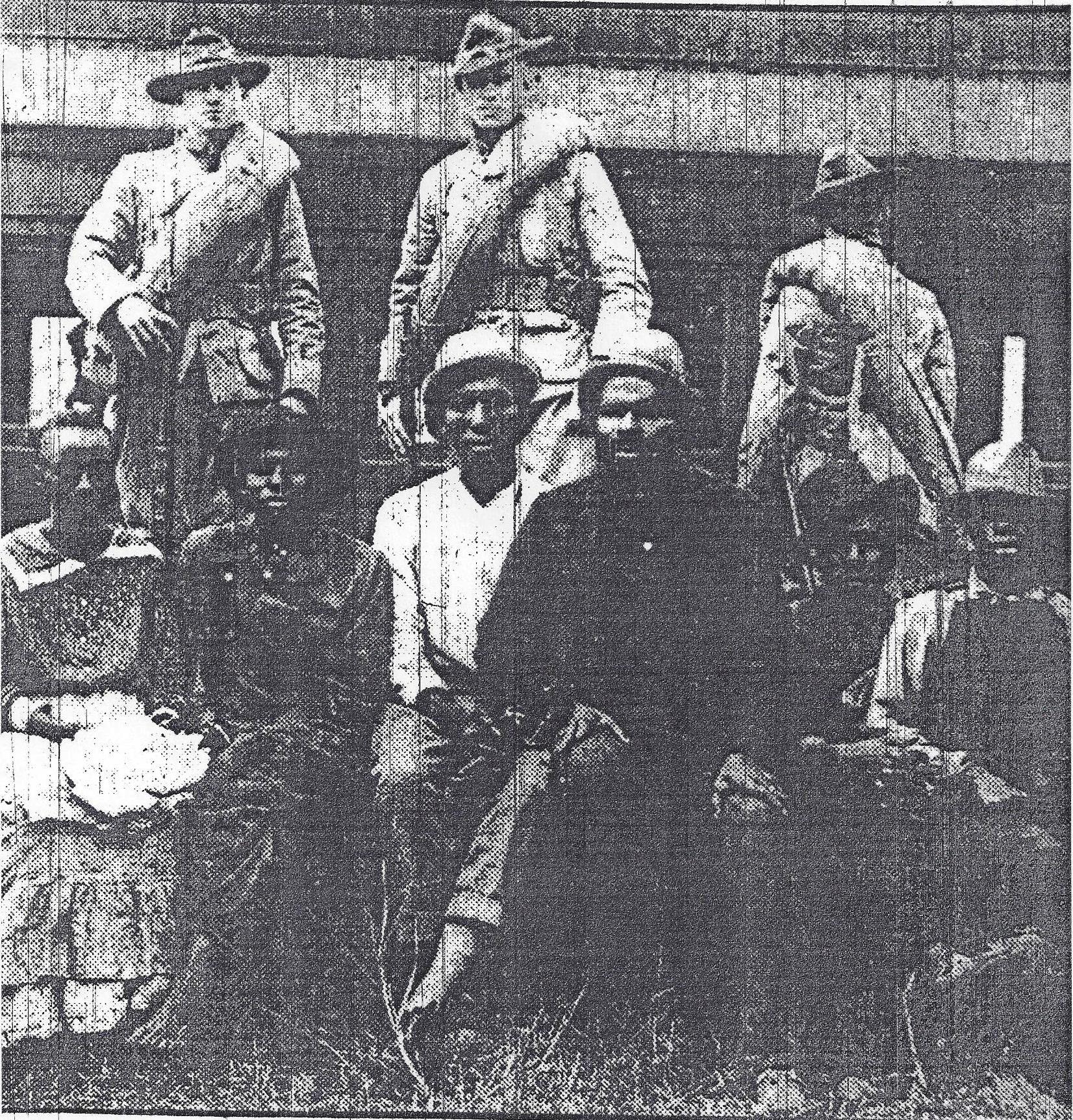
Photo taken October 2, 1912. Although not identified by the newspaper they are believed to be: (Left to Right) Trussie (Jane) Daniel, Oscar Daniel, Tony Howell (defendant in Ellen Grice rape), Ed Collins (witness), Isaiah Pirkle (witness for Howell), and Ernest Knox

All five trials, (including Tony Howell for the Ellen Grice case) were set for October 3 in Cumming, the county seat. The prisoners were escorted by four companies of the state militia by train to the Buford, Georgia station, and walked the remaining 14 miles (23 km).

The trial of Tony Howell was postponed due to the lack of evidence. Howell had an alibi, with Isaiah Pirkle as a witness. The case would never go to trial, and was eventually dismissed.

As part of a plea bargain, Trussie Daniel changed her story and agreed to turn state's witness. Charges against her and Collins were dropped, in exchange for her testimony against Knox, her brother Oscar, and Edwards. The all-white jury deliberated 16 minutes and returned a verdict of guilty in Knox's case. Although no confession or other evidence linked Oscar Daniel to the crime, his sister's testimony was fatal. The all-white jury pronounced him guilty that night.

On the following day, October 4, both teenagers were sentenced to death by hanging, scheduled for October 25. State law prohibited public hangings. The scheduled execution was to be viewed only by the victim's family, a minister, and law officers. Gallows were built off the square in Cumming. A fence erected around the gallows was burned down the night before the execution. A crowd estimated at between 5,000 and 8,000 gathered to watch the hanging of the two youths, at a time when the total county population was around 12,000.

In the following months, a small group of men called "Night Riders" terrorized black citizens, threatening them to leave in 24 hours or be killed. Those who resisted were subjected to further harassment, including shots fired into their homes, or livestock killed. Some white residents tried to stop the Night Riders, but were unsuccessful. An estimated 98% of black residents of Forsyth County left. Some property owners were able to sell, likely at a loss. The renters and sharecroppers left to seek safer places. Those who abandoned property, and failed to continue paying property tax, eventually lost it, and whites took it over. Many black properties ended up in white hands without a sale and without a legal transfer of title. The anti-black campaign spread across Northern Georgia, with similar results of whites expelling blacks in many surrounding counties.

In the 1910 census, more than 1,000 black and mixed-race people were recorded in Forsyth County, with slightly more than 10,000 whites. By the 1920 census only 30 ethnic African Americans remained in the county.

In the 2000s and 2010s, Forsyth County experienced unprecedented growth with the population increasing from 98,000 in 2010 to 251,000 in 2020 with the Asian population increasing from less than 1.0% to nearly 18.0% of the population.

Since the 1990s, Forsyth County has become more racially and culturally diverse. There are an increasing number of Asian, Hispanic, and African-American families relocating to Forsyth County mainly due to the abundance of high performing and resource-rich public schools in the county.

==== Marches and demonstrations of the 1980s ====
More ethnically diverse citizens had begun in recent years to migrate to the county, particularly in the affluent southern portion. However, racial tension continued to be a part of the county's image into the early 1990s. On January 17, 1987, civil rights activists marched in Cumming, and a counter-demonstration was made by a branch of the Ku Klux Klan, most of whom were not residents of the county, as well as others who objected to the march. According to a story published in The New York Times on January 18, four marchers were slightly injured by stones and bottles thrown at them. Eight people from the counter-demonstration, all white, were arrested. The charges included trespassing and carrying concealed weapons.

White Forsyth resident Charles A. Blackburn wanted to have a brotherhood march to celebrate the first annual celebration of national holiday Martin Luther King Jr. Day. He wanted to dispel the racist image of Forsyth County, where he owned and operated a private school, the Blackburn Learning Center. Blackburn cancelled his plans after he received threatening phone calls. Other whites in nearby counties, as well as State Representative Billy McKinney of Atlanta and Hosea Williams, who was on the Atlanta City Council, took up the march plans instead.

The following week, January 24, approximately 20,000 participants marched in Cumming. This occurrence produced no violence, despite the presence of more than 5,000 counter-demonstrators, summoned by the Forsyth County Defense League. The county and state had mustered about 2,000 peace officers and National Guardsmen. Forsyth County paid $670,000 for police overtime during the political demonstration. (V. S. Naipaul's interview with Forsyth County Sheriff Wesley Walraven, before the second march, is referred to in his book A Turn in the South.)

The demonstration is thought to have been the largest civil rights demonstration in the U.S. since about 1970. The unexpected turnout of some 5,000 counter-demonstrators, 66 of whom were arrested for "parading without a permit," turned out to be the largest resistance opposed to civil rights since the 1960s. The counter-demonstration was called by the Forsyth County Defense League and the Nationalist Movement, newly organized in Cumming by local plumber Mark Watts.

Marchers came for the second march from all over the country, forming a caravan from Atlanta; National Guard troops were assigned for protection on freeway overpasses along the route. When marchers, including John Lewis, Andrew Young, Julian Bond, Coretta Scott King, Joseph Lowery, Sam Nunn, Benjamin Hooks, Gary Hart and Wyche Fowler arrived, they discovered that most of the Cumming residents had left town for the day. Some had boarded up their windows because they feared violence. Marchers wound slowly through streets lined by hundreds of armed National Guardsmen, many of them black. Forsyth County subsequently charged large fees for parade permits until the practice was overturned in Forsyth County, Georgia v. The Nationalist Movement (505 U.S. 123) in the Supreme Court of the United States on June 19, 1992.

== Geography ==
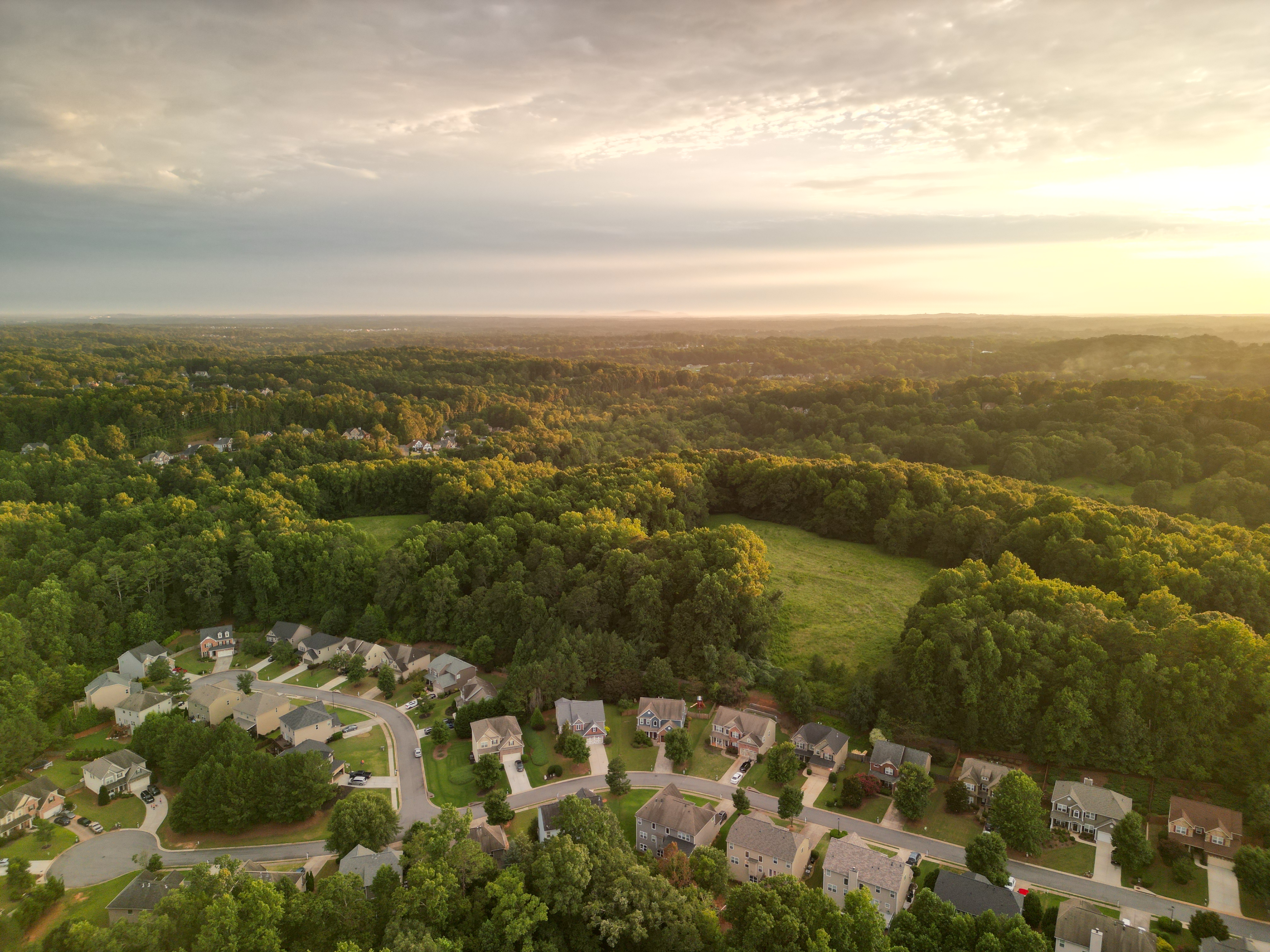
Aerial view of Forsyth County

According to the U.S. Census Bureau, the county has a total area of 247 square miles (640 km^{2}), of which 224 square miles (580 km^{2}) is land and 23 square miles (60 km^{2}) (9.4%) is water.

The eastern two-thirds of Forsyth County are located in the Upper Chattahoochee River sub-basin of the ACF River Basin (Apalachicola-Chattahoochee-Flint River Basin), while the northwestern third of the county is located in the Etowah River sub-basin of the ACT River Basin (Coosa-Tallapoosa River Basin).

=== Adjacent counties ===
- Dawson County - north
- Hall County - east
- Gwinnett County - southeast
- Fulton County - southwest
- Cherokee County - northwest

=== National protected areas ===
- Chattahoochee River National Recreation Area (part)

== Communities ==
=== City ===
- Cumming (county seat)

=== Unincorporated communities ===
With only one officially incorporated city, the majority of Forsyth County citizens live in areas with zip codes assigned to cities in surrounding counties. In addition, there are several unincorporated communities throughout the county.

- Big Creek
- Coal Mountain
- Chestatee
- Daves Creek
- Drew
- Ducktown
- Heardville
- Hightower
- Matt
- Oscarville
- Pirkle Woods
- Silver City

Some areas in Forsyth County have Suwanee postal addresses, but the city proper of Suwanee is in Gwinnett County.

== Demographics ==
Historical population
Census	Pop.	Note	%±
1840	6,619		—
1850	8,850		33.7%
1860	7,749		−12.4%
1870	7,983		3.0%
1880	10,559		32.3%
1890	11,155		5.6%
1900	11,550		3.5%
1910	11,940		3.4%
1920	11,755		−1.5%
1930	10,624		−9.6%
1940	11,322		6.6%
1950	11,005		−2.8%
1960	12,170		10.6%
1970	16,928		39.1%
1980	27,958		65.2%
1990	44,083		57.7%
2000	98,407		123.2%
2010	175,511		78.4%
2020	251,283		43.2%
2025 (est.)	282,805	▲	12.5%
U.S. Decennial Census; 1790-1880 1890-1910; 1920-1930 1930-1940; 1940-1950 1960-1980; 1980-2000 2010 2020

=== Racial and ethnic composition ===
Forsyth County, Georgia – Racial and ethnic composition Note: the US Census treats Hispanic/Latino as an ethnic category. This table excludes Latinos from the racial categories and assigns them to a separate category. Hispanics/Latinos may be of any race.
Race / Ethnicity (NH = Non-Hispanic)	Pop 1980	Pop 1990	Pop 2000	Pop 2010	Pop 2020	% 1980	% 1990	% 2000	% 2010	% 2020
White alone (NH)	27,664	43,257	90,820	140,943	159,407	98.95%	98.13%	92.29%	80.30%	63.44%
Black or African American alone (NH)	1	9	426	4,287	10,455	0.00%	0.02%	0.43%	2.44%	4.16%
Native American or Alaska Native alone (NH)	126	92	200	362	456	0.45%	0.21%	0.20%	0.21%	0.18%
Asian alone (NH)	16	81	771	10,875	45,117	0.06%	0.18%	0.78%	6.20%	17.95%
Native Hawaiian or Pacific Islander alone (NH)	x	x	10	54	85	x	x	0.01%	0.03%	0.03%
Other race alone (NH)	15	9	50	316	1,255	0.05%	0.02%	0.05%	0.18%	0.50%
Mixed race or Multiracial (NH)	x	x	653	2,124	9,282	x	x	0.66%	1.21%	3.69%
Hispanic or Latino (any race)	136	635	5,477	16,550	25,226	0.49%	1.44%	5.57%	9.43%	10.04%
Total	27,958	44,083	98,407	175,511	251,283	100.00%	100.00%	100.00%	100.00%	100.00%

=== 2020 census ===
As of the 2020 census, the county had a population of 251,283. The median age was 38.7 years. 27.9% of residents were under the age of 18 and 12.6% of residents were 65 years of age or older. For every 100 females there were 96.9 males, and for every 100 females age 18 and over there were 93.8 males age 18 and over. 92.3% of residents lived in urban areas, while 7.7% lived in rural areas.

The racial makeup of the county was 65.1% White, 4.3% Black or African American, 0.4% American Indian and Alaska Native, 18.0% Asian, 0.0% Native Hawaiian and Pacific Islander, 4.1% from some other race, and 8.1% from two or more races. Hispanic or Latino residents of any race comprised 10.0% of the population.

There were 83,551 households in the county, of which 45.9% had children under the age of 18 living with them and 17.3% had a female householder with no spouse or partner present. About 15.2% of all households were made up of individuals and 6.6% had someone living alone who was 65 years of age or older.

There were 87,581 housing units, of which 4.6% were vacant. Among occupied housing units, 82.1% were owner-occupied and 17.9% were renter-occupied. The homeowner vacancy rate was 1.5% and the rental vacancy rate was 7.1%.

== Education ==
=== Higher education ===
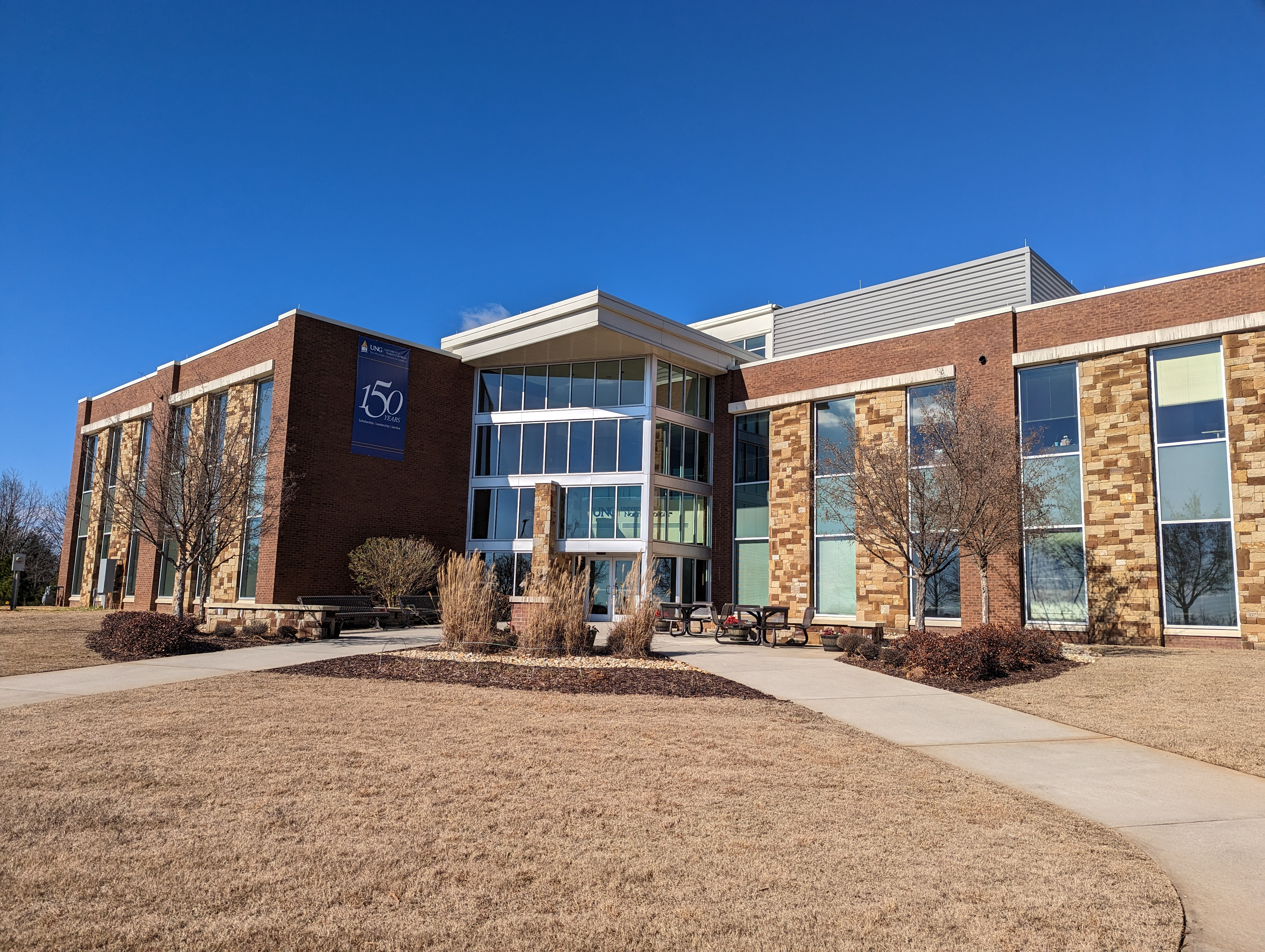
The library at the University of North Georgia Cumming campus.

In 2012, the University of North Georgia established its Cumming campus.

=== Private K-12 education ===
- Cornerstone Schools
- Covenant Christian Academy
- Fideles Christian School
- Friendship Christian School
- Horizon Christian Academy
- Ivy League Montessori School
- Lakeview Academy
- McGinnis Woods School
- Montessori Academy at Sharon Springs
- Pinecrest Academy

=== Public K-12 education ===
Forsyth County is served by Forsyth County Schools. FCS serves over 51,000 students and is the largest employer in the county with over 8000 full-time employees and substitutes. Out of 180 school districts, FCS is the seventh largest school system in Georgia. FCS is home to 41 schools – twenty-two elementary, eleven middle, seven high schools, and one college and career high school, as well as the Academies for Creative Education (A.C.E) that houses one school, iAchieve Virtual Academy, FCS' 6–12 online school, and two programs, Gateway Academy (the alternative program for middle and high school students) and Forsyth Academy.

Elementary schools:

- Big Creek Elementary School
- Brandywine Elementary School
- Brookwood Elementary School
- Chattahoochee Elementary School
- Chestatee Elementary School
- Coal Mountain Elementary School
- Cumming Elementary School
- Daves Creek Elementary School
- Haw Creek Elementary School
- Johns Creek Elementary School
- Kelly Mill Elementary School
- Mashburn Elementary School
- Matt Elementary School
- Midway Elementary School
- Poole's Mill Elementary School
- Sawnee Elementary School
- Settles Bridge Elementary School
- Sharon Elementary School
- Shiloh Point Elementary School
- Silver City Elementary School
- Vickery Creek Elementary School
- Whitlow Elementary School

Middle schools:

- DeSana Middle School
- Hendricks Middle School
- Lakeside Middle School
- Liberty Middle School
- Little Mill Middle School
- North Forsyth Middle School
- Otwell Middle School
- Piney Grove Middle School
- Riverwatch Middle School
- South Forsyth Middle School
- Vickery Creek Middle School

High schools:

- Alliance Academy for Innovation
- Denmark High School
- East Forsyth High School
- Forsyth Central High School
- Lambert High School
- North Forsyth High School
- South Forsyth High School
- West Forsyth High School

== Economy ==
Among the largest employers in the county are Northside Hospital, Koch Foods, Tyson Foods, Siemens, Scientific Games Corporation, Arris International, Baran Telecom, America BOA, Automation Direct, and L-3 Communications Display Systems.

An indicator that part of the county had reached the status of a mainstream suburban/exurban area and was starting to create new, positive history beyond its racist past, a mixed-use development Halcyon with residential, office, dining and entertainment facilities, opened in the southern part of the county near Alpharetta in summer 2019.

== Recreation ==
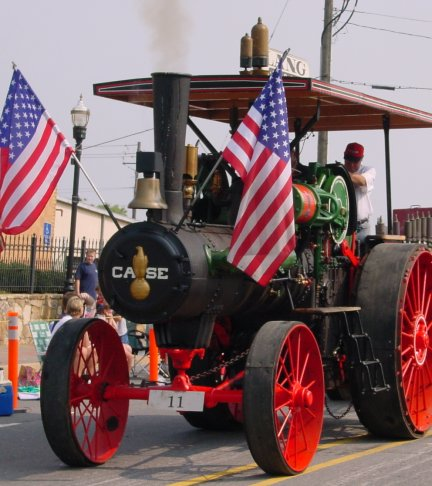
One of the steam engines in the July 4, 2002 Parade in downtown Cumming

Lake Lanier, a 37,000-acre (150 km^{2}) lake created and maintained by the United States Army Corps of Engineers in association with Buford Dam, is enjoyed by many residents and non-residents alike. Fishing, boating, tubing, wake boarding, and water skiing are common activities on the lake.

Forsyth County Parks and Recreation Department maintains 25 parks and facilities in the county. Most notable are Sawnee Mountain Preserve, Central Park, Fowler Park, Poole's Mill Covered Bridge and the Big Creek Greenway. The Cumming Fairgrounds host many events throughout the year including a rodeo, The Cumming Country Fair, and a farmers' market. There is also the annual July 4 Steam Engine Parade.

== Government and politics ==
Forsyth County is governed by a five-member board of commissioners, whose members are elected from single-member districts to four-year terms, and a county manager.

Forsyth County Board of Commissioners (as of 2025)
Name	Party	First elected	District
Kerry Hill	Rep	2022	1
Alfred John	Rep	2020	2
Todd Levent	Rep	2010	3
Mendy Moore	Rep	2024	4
Laura Semanson	Rep	2016	5

David McKee is the current county manager, assuming the post on December 16, 2022.

The city of Cumming is located in district 1, which also extends to the west. District 2 is located in the southern tip of Forsyth County. District 3 is to the southwest of Cumming, between districts 1 and 2. District 4 comprises most of the north of the county and district 5 comprises the east and southeast of the county, including most of the county's shoreline.

The board of commissioners has also established and is assisted by a number of governmental bodies.

- Animal Control Board
- Avita Community Partners Board of Directors
- Board of Health
- Board of Voter Registrations and Elections
- Chestatee–Chattahoochee Resource Conservation and Development Council
- Civil Service Board
- Drug Abuse Treatment and Education (DATE) Fund Advisory Committee
- Development Authority of Forsyth County
- Equalization Board I
- Equalization Board II
- Family and Children Services
- Forsyth County Citizen Stakeholders
- Forsyth County E-911 Advisory Board
- Forsyth County Fire Department
- Georgia Mountains Regional Commission Council
- Georgia Mountains Workforce Development Board
- Keep Forsyth County Beautiful Board of Directors
- Lanier Joint Development Authority
- Library Board of Trustees
- Metro North Georgia Water Planning District Technical Coordinating Committee
- Metro North Georgia Water Planning District Governing Board
- North Georgia Emergency Medical Services Advisory Council
- Parks and Recreation Board
- Planning Commission
- Public Facilities Authority
- Region One Department of Behavioral Health and Developmental Disabilities (DBHDD) Planning Board
- Social Services Committee
- Tax Assessors Board
- Tree Protection Commission
- Tripartite Committee
- Water and Sewerage Authority
- Zoning Board of Appeals

The county is also a member of the Association County Commissioners of Georgia and the National Association of Counties.

=== Previous local officials ===
==== County managers ====
- Rhonda Poston-O'Connor, 2007–2008
- Doug Derrer, 2008–2017
- Eric Johnson (2017–2020)

==== County commissioners ====
- Jack Conway, 2005–2006 (District 3)
- David Richard, –2008 (District 4)
- Linda K. Ledbetter, –2008 (District 5)
- Charles Laughinghouse, 2003–2010 (District 1)
- Jim Harrell, 2007–2010 (District 3)
- Patrick B. Bell, 2009–2012 (District 4)
- Jim Boff, 2009–2016 (District 5)
- Brian R. Tam, 2005–2016 (District 2)
- Rick Swope, 2017 (District 2)
- R.J. "Pete" Amos, 2011–2018 (District 1)
- Dennis T. Brown, 2018–2020 (District 2)

=== Other elected officials ===
Forsyth County had voting patterns similar to most Solid South and Georgia counties prior to 1968 in presidential elections. It only backed Republican Herbert Hoover before then once in 1928 amidst anti-Catholic sentiment towards Al Smith. From 1968 onward, the county has swung strongly away from the Democratic Party at the presidential level, only failing to vote Republican in presidential elections in 1968, when segregationist George Wallace appealed to anti-Civil Rights Act sentiment, and in the two elections Georgian Jimmy Carter was on the ballot, in 1976 and 1980. In addition, unlike the inner suburban counties of the Atlanta metropolitan area, Forsyth County has continued to vote for Republicans by landslide margins. However, just like other Atlanta suburbs, the county's share of Democratic voters has nevertheless increased in recent years; in 2020, Joe Biden was the first Democratic presidential nominee to win over 30% of the county's vote since Carter, and Republican Donald Trump's margin of victory was only about half that of Mitt Romney eight years previously.

United States presidential election results for Forsyth County, Georgia
Year	Republican		Democratic		Third party(ies)	
Year	No.	%	No.	%	No.	%
1880	120	9.38%	1,159	90.62%	0	0.00%
1884	137	19.74%	557	80.26%	0	0.00%
1888	209	11.61%	1,579	87.72%	12	0.67%
1892	163	10.30%	645	40.75%	775	48.96%
1896	259	33.64%	482	62.60%	29	3.77%
1900	270	42.52%	318	50.08%	47	7.40%
1904	357	33.52%	455	42.72%	253	23.76%
1908	345	59.90%	150	26.04%	81	14.06%
1912	15	2.98%	325	64.48%	164	32.54%
1916	166	10.72%	1,146	74.03%	236	15.25%
1920	741	47.68%	813	52.32%	0	0.00%
1924	298	28.93%	715	69.42%	17	1.65%
1928	934	76.49%	287	23.51%	0	0.00%
1932	117	6.69%	1,627	92.97%	6	0.34%
1936	551	41.40%	780	58.60%	0	0.00%
1940	634	31.51%	1,378	68.49%	0	0.00%
1944	695	39.90%	1,047	60.10%	0	0.00%
1948	573	21.53%	1,813	68.11%	276	10.37%
1952	536	27.82%	1,391	72.18%	0	0.00%
1956	1,131	36.15%	1,998	63.85%	0	0.00%
1960	841	26.70%	2,309	73.30%	0	0.00%
1964	1,471	46.64%	1,682	53.33%	1	0.03%
1968	1,389	31.33%	647	14.60%	2,397	54.07%
1972	2,968	84.39%	549	15.61%	0	0.00%
1976	1,443	23.52%	4,693	76.48%	0	0.00%
1980	3,157	40.81%	4,325	55.91%	254	3.28%
1984	6,841	75.04%	2,275	24.96%	0	0.00%
1988	7,947	76.83%	2,347	22.69%	50	0.48%
1992	8,652	50.64%	4,936	28.89%	3,498	20.47%
1996	15,013	64.83%	5,957	25.72%	2,189	9.45%
2000	27,769	77.66%	6,694	18.72%	1,292	3.61%
2004	47,267	83.04%	9,201	16.17%	451	0.79%
2008	59,166	78.36%	15,406	20.40%	931	1.23%
2012	65,908	80.47%	14,571	17.79%	1,421	1.74%
2016	69,851	70.58%	23,462	23.71%	5,651	5.71%
2020	85,123	65.79%	42,208	32.62%	2,046	1.58%
2024	91,281	66.03%	45,509	32.92%	1,459	1.06%

United States Senate election results for Forsyth County, Georgia2
Year	Republican		Democratic		Third party(ies)	
Year	No.	%	No.	%	No.	%
2020	85,652	66.78%	39,229	30.58%	3,386	2.64%
2020	78,263	67.94%	36,936	32.06%	0	0.00%

United States Senate election results for Forsyth County, Georgia3
Year	Republican		Democratic		Third party(ies)	
Year	No.	%	No.	%	No.	%
2020	44,383	34.95%	23,895	18.81%	58,722	46.24%
2020	77,451	67.27%	37,687	32.73%	0	0.00%
2022	66,013	64.81%	32,852	32.25%	2,988	2.93%
2022	58,295	65.70%	30,433	34.30%	0	0.00%

Forsyth County is one of nine counties that shifted more than 25 percentage points to the left from 2012 to 2024. It is also the only one among them to remain safely Republican for the duration of that time period, with its margin shrinking from 63% to 33%.

==== United States Congress ====
U.S. Senators
Name	Party	First elected	Class
Jon Ossoff	Dem	2020–21	2
Raphael Warnock	Dem	2020–21 (special)	3

U.S. Representatives
Name	Party	First elected	District
Rich McCormick	Rep	2022	7th

===== Georgia State Senate =====
District	Name	Party	Assumed Office
27	Greg Dolezal	Republican	2019
51	Steve Gooch	Republican	2011

===== Georgia House of Representatives =====
District	Name	Party	Assumed Office
28	Brent Cox	Republican	2023
11	Rick Jasperse	Republican	2010
24	Carter Barrett	Republican	2023
25	Todd Jones	Republican	2017
26	Lauren McDonald	Republican	2021

== Transportation ==
=== Major highways ===
- U.S. Route 19 / State Route 400 (Lee Highway)
- State Route 9
- State Route 20
- State Route 53
- State Route 141
- State Route 306
- State Route 369
- State Route 371

=== Pedestrians and cycling ===
- Big Creek Greenway

== See also ==
- National Register of Historic Places listings in Forsyth County, Georgia
- List of counties in Georgia
- List of sundown towns in the United States
