= West Forsyth High School (Georgia) =

Public high school in Cumming, Georgia, United States

Coordinates: 34°12′30.77″N 84°12′50.18″W

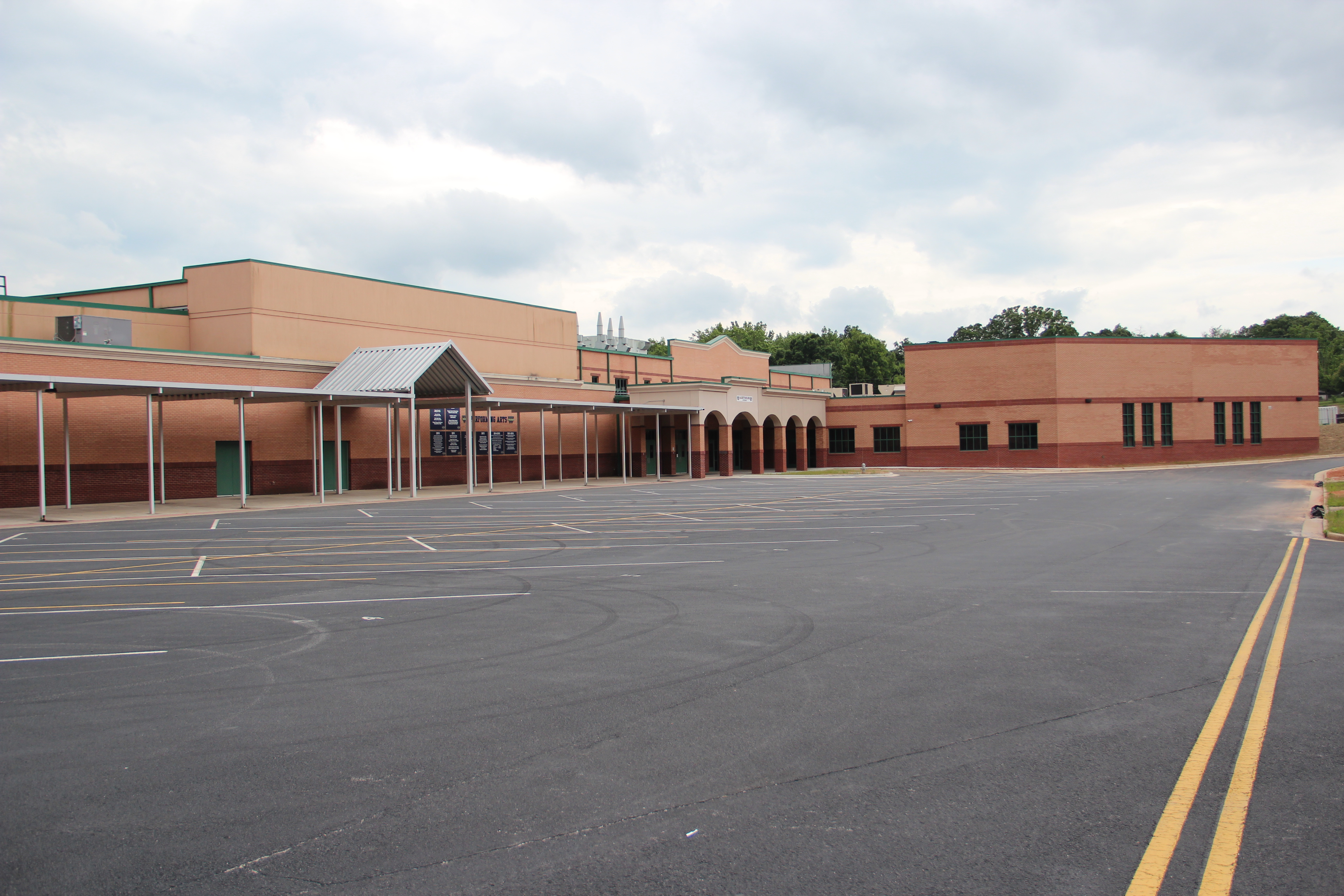
- West Forsyth High School in 2017

Location
- 4155 Drew Road; Cumming, Georgia 30040; United States

Information
- Type: Public school
- Motto: "We Are West"
- Established: 2007; 19 years ago
- School district: Forsyth County Schools
- Principal: Aaron Archambeau
- Teaching staff: 130.20 (FTE)
- Grades: 9–12
- Enrollment: 2,464 (2023–2024)
- Student to teacher ratio: 18.92
- Colors: Vegas gold and navy
- Mascot: Wolverine
- Rival: South Forsyth, Denmark High School, Lambert High School, Forsyth Central High School
- Website: West Forsyth High School

West Forsyth High School is a public high school, located in Cumming, Georgia, United States, a suburb northeast of Atlanta. The school is located at 4155 Drew Road.

West Forsyth High School opened in 2007 with 1,200 students in grades 9 through 11, with a senior class added the following year. West Forsyth High School was the first true high school since Forsyth Central (formally Forsyth County High) was built in 1955. North and South Forsyth High are converted junior high schools. West Forsyth High was built to alleviate overcrowding at South Forsyth and Forsyth Central high schools. West Forsyth High is the first construction of the district's two-story high school prototype. The school motto, "I am West Forsyth, and we are family" is commonly used at the school.

== Athletics and clubs ==
West Forsyth currently competes in the GHSA Region 6-AAAAAAA in all sports, except for lacrosse, in which it competes in Area 3-AAAAAA, and has since 2010.

WFHS has varsity sports teams in competition cheerleading, cross country, football, softball, volleyball, basketball, swimming, wrestling, baseball, golf, lacrosse, track, tennis, soccer and gymnastics.

The school's clubs include the National Honor Society, Fellowship of Christian Athletes, an equestrian club and a dance team.

West Forsyth also has a Region 5-AAAAAAA competing theatre troupe.

The school has a renowned AP program offering over 20 courses.

West Forsyth has received multiple honors including AP STEM Achievement School, AP Merit School, and AP Humanities School.

West Forsyth has the fourth largest DECA chapter in the world, as of the 2024-2025 school year.

== Notable alumni ==
- Rachael Kirkconnell (2015), winner of The Bachelor season 25
- Connor Tomlinson (2018) TV personality who starred in Love on the Spectrum
- Talia DellaPeruta (2020), soccer player who plays professionally in The Netherlands
- Dylan Fairchild (2021), Starting Left Guard for the Cincinnati Bengals
- Oscar Delp (2022), football player for the Georgia Bulldogs
