= Ducktown, Georgia =

Unincorporated community in Georgia, U.S.

Coordinates: 34°14′38″N 84°14′58″W

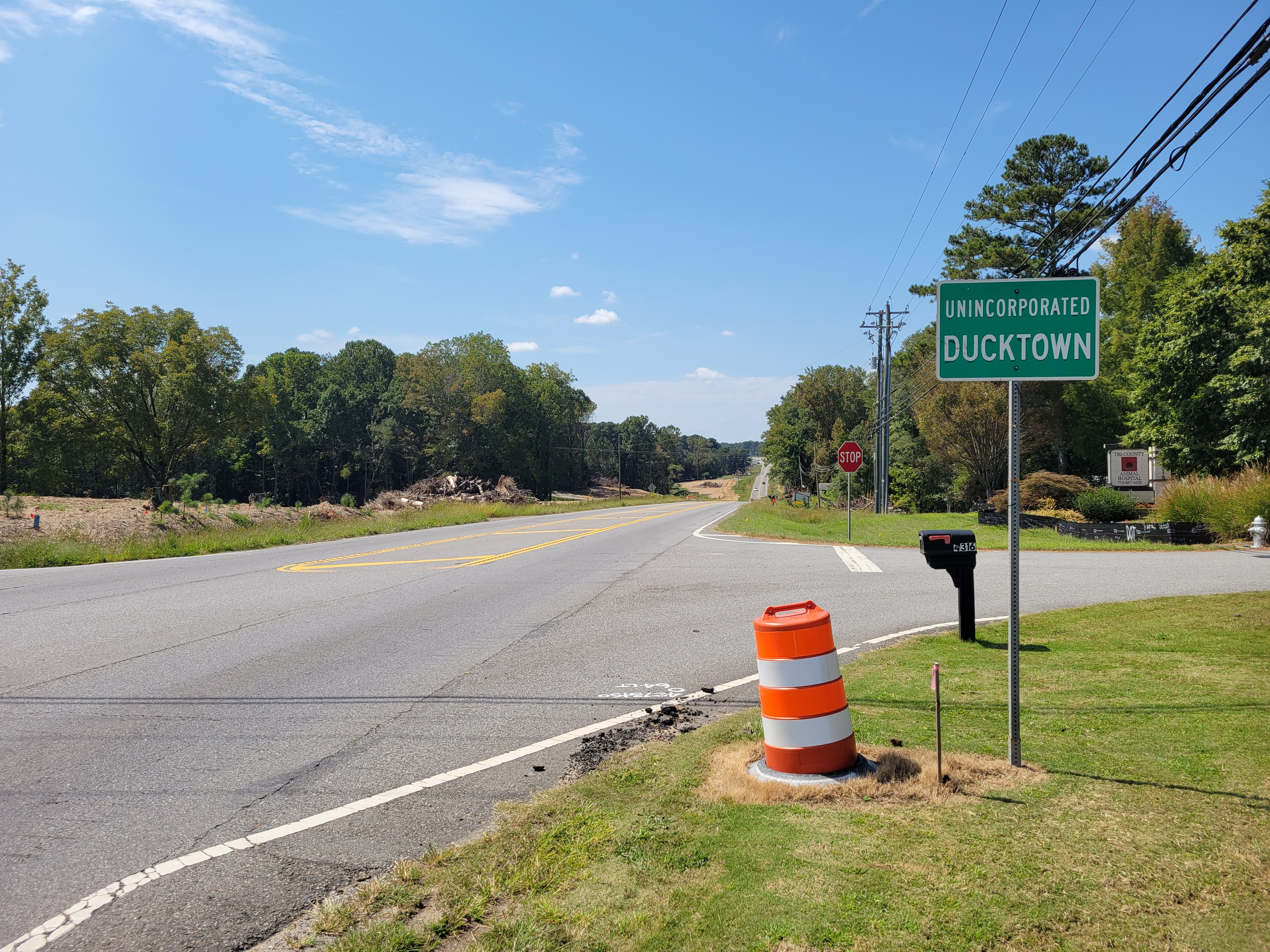
Ducktown sign

Ducktown is an unincorporated community in Forsyth County, in the U.S. state of Georgia.

== History ==
The name may be a transfer from Ducktown, Tennessee. A post office called Ducktown was established in 1899, and remained in operation until 1903; The Georgia General Assembly incorporated the place in 1912 as the "Town of Ducktown". The town's municipal charter was dissolved in 1995.
