= Denmark High School (Georgia) =

Public high school in Forsyth County, Georgia, United States

Location
- 645 Mullinax Road; Alpharetta, Forsyth County, Georgia 30004; United States; 34°09′09″N 84°13′45″W

Information
- Type: Public school
- Established: 2018; 8 years ago
- School district: Forsyth County Schools
- Principal: Kim Oliver
- Teaching staff: 137.90 (on an FTE basis)
- Grades: 9–12
- Enrollment: 2,490 (2023-2024)
- Student to teacher ratio: 18.06
- Colors: Carolina blue, navy blue and white
- Athletics conference: 6AAAAAA
- Mascot: Great Dane
- Nickname: Danes
- Accreditation: Cognia
- Yearbook: Pedigree
- Website: dhs.forsyth.k12.ga.us

Denmark High School is a public high school in Forsyth County, Georgia, United States. It serves grades 9–12 for Forsyth County Schools.

== History ==
The school's groundbreaking was on May 25, 2016 and construction was completed in July 2018. Denmark was opened with the main purpose of relieving overcrowding in South Forsyth High School and West Forsyth High School, current rivals of the school. It is named for the late Leila Daughtry Denmark (1898–2012), one of the first female pediatricians in Georgia, retiring in May 2001 at the age of 103. The school opened with an initial enrollment of 1,300 students, and only served grades 9–11 in its inaugural year. As of the 2022-2023 school year, its enrollment is 2,391 students. It is the largest public high school in Georgia by campus area, with a size of 110 acres. The school was built on the property of Dr. Leila Denmark.

== Academics ==
Denmark High School has been accredited by Cognia since June 2018. They have different pathways for students to learn new skills.

== Student data ==
During the 2023–24 school year, Denmark had an enrollment of 2,490 students. The student body was 35% Asian, 35% White, 19% Hispanic, 8% Black, and 3% multiracial or other.
