= North Forsyth High School (Georgia) =

Public school in Georgia, United States

Coordinates: 34°16′39.08″N 84°6′26.84″W

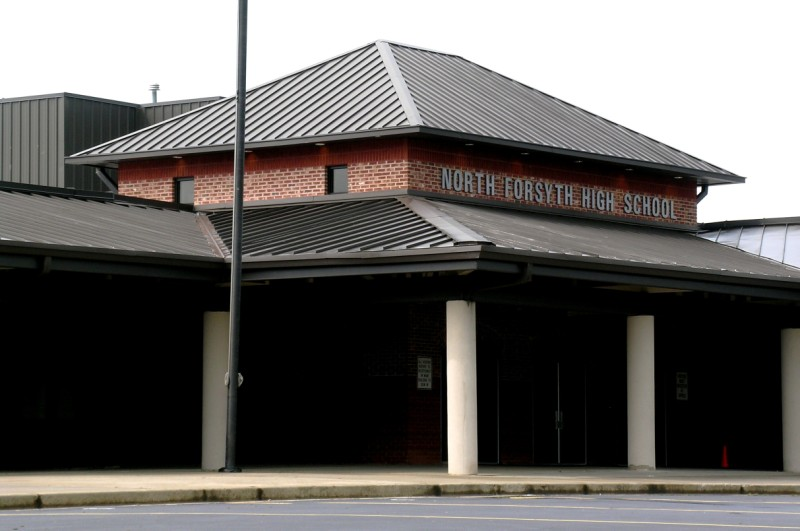

Location
- 3635 Coal Mountain Drive; Cumming, Georgia 30028; United States

Information
- Type: Public school
- Motto: Pride Passion Purpose
- Established: 1994
- Principal: Carrie MacAllaster
- Faculty: 151
- Teaching staff: 130.10 (FTE)
- Grades: 9–12
- Enrollment: 2,151 (2024–2025)
- Student to teacher ratio: 16.53
- Colors: Black, purple, silver, and white
- Mascot: Raiders
- Rival: Forsyth Central High School

North Forsyth High School is a public high school located in Cumming, Georgia, United States, a suburb northeast of Atlanta. The school is located at 3635 Coal Mountain Drive. It is one of seven high schools in the Forsyth County School System and serves students residing in Northern Forsyth County, including the communities of Matt, Coal Mountain, Silver City, Chestatee and Oscarville.

== Student data ==
North Forsyth High School had an enrollment of 2,416 at the start of the 2016–17 school year. The numbers for the 2020-21 year was approximately 2,615.

== Facilities ==
The school was established in 1994 in the northwestern part of Forsyth County. It has three gymnasiums; an artificial turf field used for football, soccer, and lacrosse; practice fields; a baseball complex; a softball complex; and a separate performing arts center. The last addition to the school, completed in the summer of 2016, created new classrooms, a cafeteria, and a gymnasium.

== Athletics and extracurricular activities ==
North Forsyth began the 2016–17 school year by competing in Region 5-AAAAAAA (Area 3 AAAAAAA for lacrosse). North Forsyth High School competes in 15 varsity sports. The school also fields junior varsity teams for most sports, and freshmen teams in football, basketball, baseball, volleyball, and lacrosse. The school is a member of the Georgia High School Association.

=== Band ===
North Forsyth's band consists of three tiers of concert ensembles: Concert Band (GMEA Grade 3+), Symphonic Band (GMEA Grade 4+), and Wind Ensemble (GMEA Grade 5/6 or 6). These three groups have consistently scored Superior ratings at Large Group Performance Evaluations under the direction of Raymond W. Thomas (director, 2003–present) and Sean Womack (assistant director, 2023–present). The North Forsyth High School concert ensembles have been invited to perform at many festivals and locations around the world including London, England, Honolulu, Hawaii, New York City, Chicago, Washington, D.C., and Kennesaw State University. Previous band directors include Tim Keyser (1998-2003) and David Carnes (1994-1998). Previous assistant band directors include Nick Tucker (2019-2023), Kevin Kenney (2015-2019), Jeff Keegan (2006-2012), Josh Crosby (2004-2006), John David (2001-2003), and Paul Clark (1999-2001).

The band program's other excellent ensembles include the Raider Marching Band, Indoor Percussion, Jazz Band, Percussion Ensembles, and a Winter Guard program.

The Raider Marching Band is currently a Class AAAA Band.

=== MCJROTC ===
The North Forsyth High School is the only high school campus in the county that has a JROTC program, which is based on the United States Marine Corps. North Forsyth's MCJROTC has been awarded National Naval Honor School nine consecutive years. As of the 2012–2013 school year, the Raider Battalion had 197 total cadets enrolled. The drill team has also been named Best in Service (Marines) at the American Legion National Drill Competition in Montgomery Alabama in February 2011 and also won 2nd place overall. The drill team was named Best in Service four out of the last five years. The drill team were also champions of the unarmed and armed divisions at the 2011 American Legion National Drill Competition.

=== Robotics ===
The North Forsyth Robotics team competed at the national level and international level in VEX Robotics, and they have competed at the state level in the FIRST Robotics Competition. Their robotics id number for VEX Robotics is 3536, and their number in FIRST Robotics is 3815. In 2017 they won the CAD award in Georgia's BEST Robotics Competition.

== Notable alumni ==
- Colby Gossett — NFL offensive lineman, Atlanta Falcons
