= Forsyth Central High School =

Public high school in Cumming, Georgia, United States

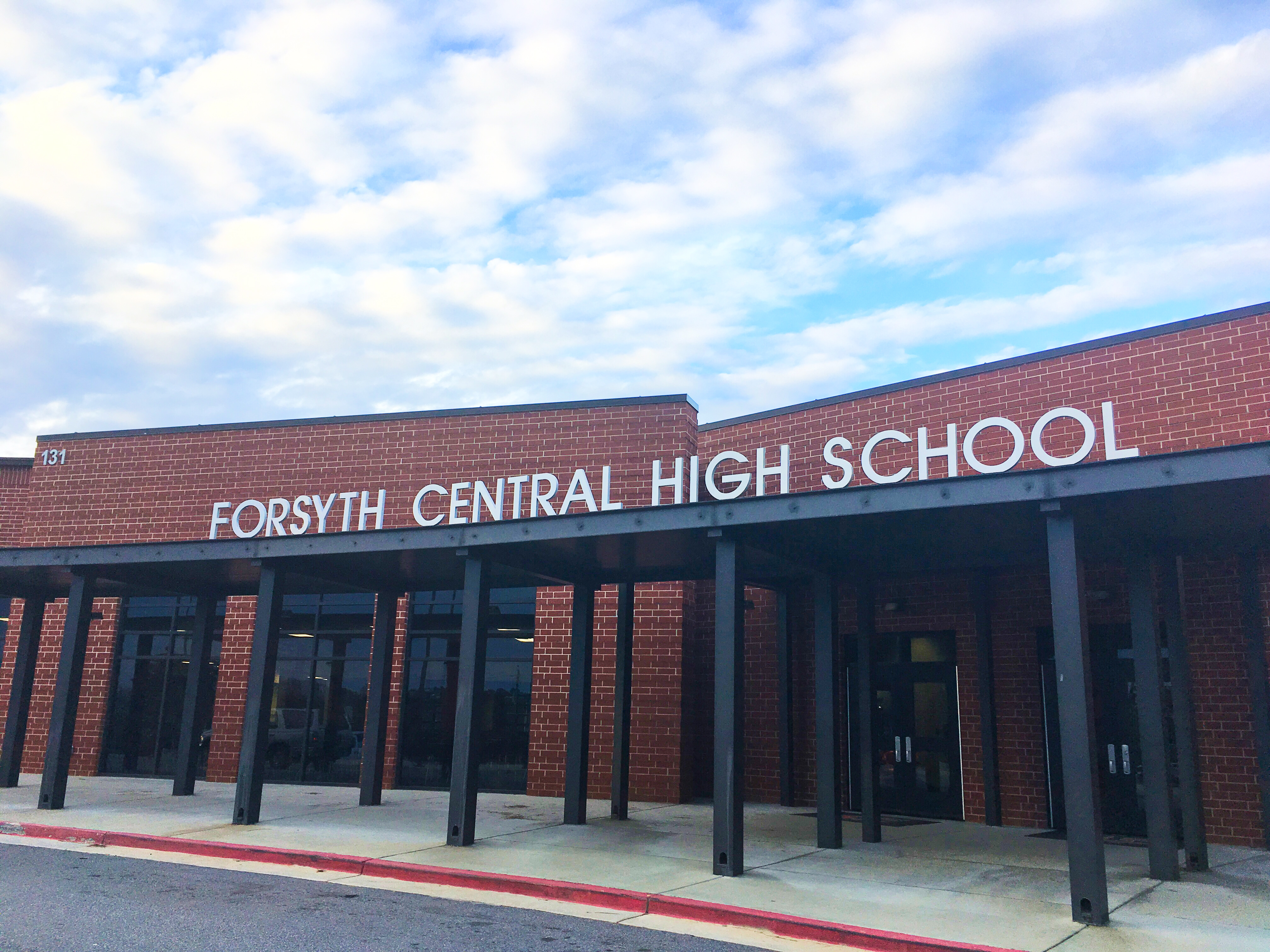

Location
- 131 Almon C. Hill Drive; Cumming, Forsyth, Georgia 30040; United States; 34°12′57.4″N 84°8′24.45″W

Information
- Former name: Forsyth County High School
- Type: Public school
- Motto: "Excellence In The Three A’s"; Academics, Arts, Athletics
- Opened: 1955
- Status: Open
- School district: Forsyth County Schools
- NCES District ID: 1302220
- CEEB code: 110920
- NCES School ID: 130222000956
- Principal: Tracey Winkler
- Teaching staff: 151.30 (FTE)
- Grades: 9–12
- Enrollment: 2,387 (2023-2024)
- Student to teacher ratio: 15.78
- Campus type: Suburban
- Colors: Black, white, and red
- Athletics conference: 7-AAAAA
- Mascot: Bulldog
- Newspaper: Central Scene
- Feeder schools: Hendricks Middle School; Lakeside Middle School; Vickery Creek Middle School; Otwell Middle School
- Website: Forsyth Central High School

Forsyth Central High School is a public high school located in Cumming, Georgia, United States, northeast of Atlanta. Built in 1955, it was originally known as Forsyth County High School until 1989 when South Forsyth High School opened. It is one of eight high schools in the Forsyth County School District.

== Student data ==
Forsyth Central High School has an approximate enrollment of 2,585 (as of the 2019-2020 school year). Most of its students are White (62.4%), or have Hispanic/Latino (26.0%) origin, with Asian (4.5%) students the third most prominent, and African-American (3.7%) students the fourth. With mixed-race (2.9%) and Native American (0.5%) being fifth and sixth, respectively. Students are mainly drawn from Lakeside, Little Mill and Otwell Middle Schools.

Forsyth Central High has developed a magnet school status because of its STEM program, high marks on school atmosphere surveys, and its clubs and extra-curricular activities.

Forsyth Central is also home to the Flash of Crimson Marching Band.

== Athletics ==
The school competes in Region 6-AAAA (Area 3 A-AAAAA for lacrosse). The school has played in the region since 2002, with the exception of the period between fall 2006 and spring 2008, when Central was part of Region 7-AAAAA.

== Notable alumni ==
- Wynn Everett, actress
- Kelli Giddish, actress
- Ethan Hankins, professional baseball player
- Micah Owings, former professional baseball player
- Glenn Sutko, former professional baseball player
- Lynn Turner, convicted murderer known as the “Black Widow”
- Brian Trapp (Phoenix), American drag performer
