= Metro Atlanta =

Metropolitan area in Georgia, United States of America

- Metropolitan Statistical Area
- Atlanta–Sandy Springs–Roswell, GA; Metropolitan Statistical Area
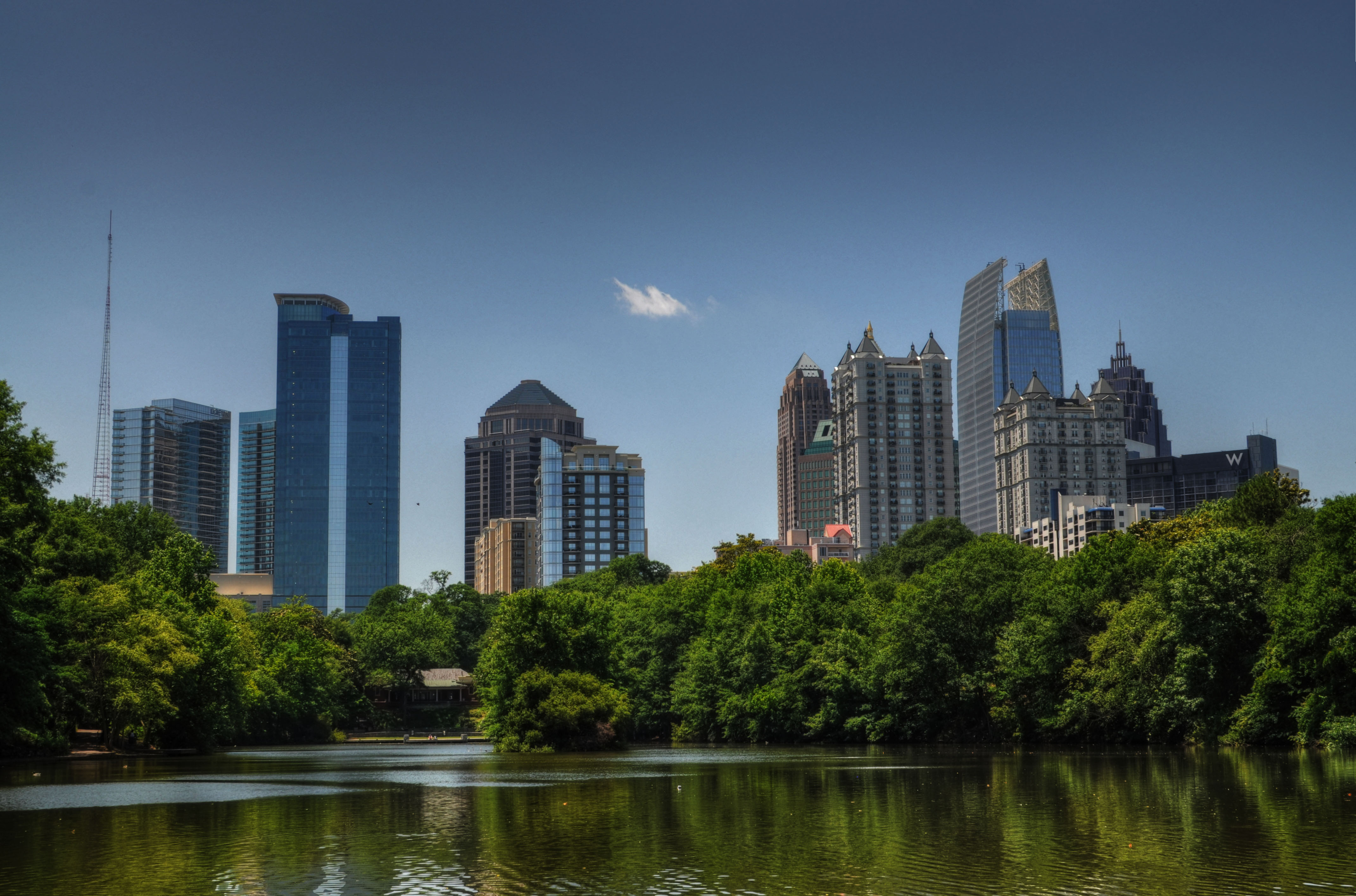
- Midtown Atlanta
Map of Atlanta–Athens-Clarke County–
Sandy Springs, GA–AL CSA
City of Atlanta
Atlanta–Sandy Springs–Roswell, GA MSA
Atlanta–Sandy Springs–Roswell, GA
Marietta, GA
Other Statistical Areas in the Atlanta CSA
Athens-Clarke County, GA MSA
Gainesville, GA MSA
LaGrange, GA–AL µSA
Rome, GA MSA
Jefferson, GA µSA
Calhoun, GA µSA
Cornelia, GA µSA
Cedartown, GA µSA
Thomaston, GA µSA
- Country: United States
- State: (Georgia (U.S. state)) Georgia; Alabama

Area
  - Metro: 8,376 sq mi (21,694 km^{2})
  - CSA: 10,494.03 sq mi (27,179.4 km^{2})
- Elevation: 607–4,452 ft (185–1,357 m)

Population (2023 estimates)
  - Density: 630/sq mi (243/km^{2})
  - Urban (2020): 5,100,112 (9th)
  - Metro: 6,411,149 (6th)
  - CSA: 7,221,137 (10th)

GDP
  - Metro: $570.663 billion (2023)
- Time zone: UTC−5 (EST)
  - Summer (DST): UTC−4 (EDT)
- ZIP codes: 300xx to 303xx
- Area codes: 404/678/470/943 inside the perimeter, 770/678/470/943 outside the perimeter

Metro Atlanta, designated by the United States Office of Management and Budget as the Atlanta–Sandy Springs–Roswell metropolitan statistical area, is the most populous metropolitan statistical area in the U.S. state of Georgia and the sixth-largest in the United States, based on the July 1, 2025 population estimates from the U.S. Census Bureau. Its economic, cultural, and demographic center is Atlanta, and its total population was 6,482,182 in the 2025 estimate from the U.S. Census Bureau.

The core 5 counties of metropolitan Atlanta are Fulton, Gwinnett, Cobb, DeKalb, and Clayton, with over 60% of the metro area’s population residing in these counties. The metro area forms the core of a broader trading area, the Atlanta–Athens–Clarke County–Sandy Springs combined statistical area. The combined statistical area spans up to 39 counties in North Georgia. The CSA recorded in the 2020 U.S. census a population of 6,930,423. One in ten (10.7%) of residents served by the Atlanta Regional Commission (including the core 5 counties of the metropolitan area) live within Atlanta city limits.

== Definitions ==
By U.S. Census Bureau standards, the population of the Atlanta region spreads across a metropolitan area of 8,376 square miles (21,694 km^{2}), comparable to the size of New Jersey. Because Georgia contains more counties than any other state except Texas (explained in part by the now-defunct county-unit system of weighing votes in primary elections), area residents live under a heavily decentralized collection of governments. As of the 2000 census, fewer than one in ten residents of the metropolitan area lived inside Atlanta city limits.

A 2006 survey by the Metro Atlanta Chamber of Commerce counted 140 cities and towns in the 28‑county Metropolitan Statistical Area in mid-2005. Eleven cities – Johns Creek (2006), Milton (2006), Chattahoochee Hills (2007), Dunwoody (2008), Peachtree Corners (2012), Brookhaven (2012), Tucker (2016), Stonecrest (2016), South Fulton (2017), Mableton (2022) and Mulberry (2024) – have incorporated since then, following the lead of Sandy Springs in 2005.

The Atlanta metropolitan area was first defined in 1950 as Fulton, DeKalb, and Cobb counties. Clayton county was added in 1956. Two years later, Gwinnett was added. Walton, Newton, Douglas, Fayette, Forsyth, Henry, Cherokee, Rockdale, and Butts counties were added after the 1970 census, with Barrow and Coweta counties joining in 1980 and Bartow, Carroll, Paulding, Pickens and Spalding counties in 1990.

Atlanta's larger combined statistical area adds the Gainesville and Athens metropolitan areas plus LaGrange, Thomaston, Jefferson, Calhoun, and Cedartown micropolitan areas, for a total 2012 population of 6,162,195. The CSA also abuts the Macon and Columbus MSAs. The region is one of the metropolises of the Southeastern United States, and is part of the emerging megalopolis known as Piedmont Atlantic Megaregion along the I-85 Corridor.

== Metropolitan statistical area ==
The counties listed below are included in the Atlanta–Sandy Springs–Roswell metropolitan statistical area. In 2023, the Office of Management and Budget split the Metropolitan statistical area into two conurbated metropolitan divisions.

The Atlanta-Sandy Springs-Roswell metropolitan division consists of the following 24 counties:

- Barrow
- Butts
- Carroll
- Clayton
- Coweta
- Dawson
- DeKalb
- Douglas
- Fayette
- Forsyth
- Fulton
- Gwinnett
- Heard
- Henry
- Jasper
- Lumpkin
- Meriwether
- Morgan
- Newton
- Pickens
- Pike
- Rockdale
- Spalding
- Walton

The Marietta metropolitan division consists of the following five counties.

- Bartow
- Cherokee
- Cobb
- Haralson
- Paulding

Some entities define a much smaller metropolitan area by including only the counties which have the densest suburban development. Fulton, DeKalb, Gwinnett, Cobb, and Clayton were the five original counties when the Atlanta metropolitan area was first defined in 1950, and continue to be the core of the metro area. These five counties along with six more (Cherokee, Douglas, Fayette, Henry, Rockdale, and Forsyth) are members of the Atlanta Regional Commission, a weak metropolitan government organization which also is a regional planning agency. The eleven ARC counties, bolded, and four more (Bartow, Coweta, Hall, Paulding), with an asterisk (*), form part of the Metropolitan North Georgia Water Planning District, created in 2001.

=== Atlanta–Sandy Springs–Roswell MSA ===
County	Seat	2020 census	2010 census	Change	Area	Density
**Fulton ***	Atlanta	1,066,710	920,581	+15.87%	534 sq mi (1,380 km^{2})	1,998/sq mi (771/km^{2})
**Gwinnett ***	Lawrenceville	957,062	805,321	+18.84%	437 sq mi (1,130 km^{2})	2,190/sq mi (846/km^{2})
**Cobb ***	Marietta	766,149	688,078	+11.35%	345 sq mi (890 km^{2})	2,221/sq mi (857/km^{2})
**DeKalb ***	Decatur	764,382	691,893	+10.48%	271 sq mi (700 km^{2})	2,821/sq mi (1,089/km^{2})
**Clayton ***	Jonesboro	297,595	259,424	+14.71%	144 sq mi (370 km^{2})	2,067/sq mi (798/km^{2})
**Cherokee ***	Canton	266,620	214,346	+24.39%	434 sq mi (1,120 km^{2})	614/sq mi (237/km^{2})
**Forsyth ***	Cumming	251,283	175,511	+43.17%	224 sq mi (580 km^{2})	1,122/sq mi (433/km^{2})
**Henry ***	McDonough	240,712	203,922	+18.04%	327 sq mi (850 km^{2})	736/sq mi (284/km^{2})
Paulding *	Dallas	168,661	142,324	+18.50%	314 sq mi (810 km^{2})	537/sq mi (207/km^{2})
Coweta *	Newnan	146,158	127,317	+14.80%	446 sq mi (1,160 km^{2})	328/sq mi (127/km^{2})
**Douglas ***	Douglasville	144,237	132,403	+8.94%	201 sq mi (520 km^{2})	718/sq mi (277/km^{2})
**Fayette ***	Fayetteville	119,194	106,567	+11.85%	199 sq mi (520 km^{2})	599/sq mi (231/km^{2})
Carroll	Carrollton	119,148	110,527	+7.80%	504 sq mi (1,310 km^{2})	236/sq mi (91/km^{2})
Newton	Covington	112,483	99,958	+12.53%	279 sq mi (720 km^{2})	403/sq mi (156/km^{2})
Bartow *	Cartersville	108,901	100,157	+8.73%	470 sq mi (1,200 km^{2})	232/sq mi (89/km^{2})
Walton	Monroe	96,673	83,768	+15.41%	330 sq mi (850 km^{2})	293/sq mi (113/km^{2})
**Rockdale ***	Conyers	93,570	85,215	+9.80%	132 sq mi (340 km^{2})	709/sq mi (274/km^{2})
Barrow	Winder	83,505	69,367	+20.38%	163 sq mi (420 km^{2})	512/sq mi (198/km^{2})
Spalding	Griffin	67,306	64,073	+5.05%	200 sq mi (520 km^{2})	337/sq mi (130/km^{2})
Lumpkin	Dahlonega	33,488	29,966	+11.75%	284 sq mi (740 km^{2})	118/sq mi (46/km^{2})
Pickens	Jasper	33,216	29,431	+12.86%	233 sq mi (600 km^{2})	143/sq mi (55/km^{2})
Haralson	Buchanan	29,919	28,780	+3.96%	283 sq mi (730 km^{2})	106/sq mi (41/km^{2})
Dawson	Dawsonville	26,798	22,330	+20.01%	214 sq mi (550 km^{2})	125/sq mi (48/km^{2})
Butts	Jackson	25,434	23,655	+7.52%	188 sq mi (490 km^{2})	135/sq mi (52/km^{2})
Meriwether	Greenville	20,613	21,992	−6.27%	505 sq mi (1,310 km^{2})	41/sq mi (16/km^{2})
Morgan	Madison	20,097	17,868	+12.47%	361 sq mi (930 km^{2})	56/sq mi (21/km^{2})
Pike	Zebulon	18,889	17,869	+5.71%	219 sq mi (570 km^{2})	86/sq mi (33/km^{2})
Jasper	Monticello	14,588	13,900	+4.95%	373 sq mi (970 km^{2})	39/sq mi (15/km^{2})
Heard	Franklin	11,412	11,834	−3.57%	301 sq mi (780 km^{2})	38/sq mi (15/km^{2})
**Total**		6,104,803	5,298,377	+15.22%	8,474 sq mi (21,950 km^{2})	720/sq mi (278/km^{2})

The 10 counties listed above with under 60,000 residents are usually not included in any other metropolitan definition except the OMB/Census Bureau's MSA and CSA.

Hall County forms the Gainesville MSA, but with astronomical growth to over 200,000 residents, is now also part of the Atlanta CSA.

The official tourism website of the State of Georgia features an "Atlanta Metro" tourism region that includes only eight counties: Fulton, DeKalb, Gwinnett, Cobb, Clayton, Douglas, Fayette, and Henry.

== Combined statistical area ==
=== Atlanta GA-AL CSA ===
Statistical area	2020 census	2010 census	Change	Area	Density
Atlanta–Sandy Springs–Roswell, GA MSA	6,089,815	5,286,728	+15.19%	8,376 sq mi (21,690 km^{2})	727/sq mi (281/km^{2})
Athens–Clarke County, GA MSA	215,415	192,541	+11.88%	1,035 sq mi (2,680 km^{2})	208/sq mi (80/km^{2})
Gainesville, GA MSA	203,136	179,684	+13.05%	429 sq mi (1,110 km^{2})	474/sq mi (183/km^{2})
LaGrange, GA-AL Micropolitan Statistical Area	104,198	101,259	+2.90%	446 sq mi (1,160 km^{2})	234/sq mi (90/km^{2})
Rome, GA MSA	98,584	96,317	+2.35%	518 sq mi (1,340 km^{2})	190/sq mi (73/km^{2})
Jefferson, GA Micropolitan Statistical Area	75,907	60,485	+25.50%	343 sq mi (890 km^{2})	221/sq mi (85/km^{2})
Cornelia, GA Micropolitan Statistical Area	46,031	43,041	+6.95%	279 sq mi (720 km^{2})	165/sq mi (64/km^{2})
Cedartown, GA Micropolitan Statistical Area	42,853	41,475	+3.32%	312 sq mi (810 km^{2})	137/sq mi (53/km^{2})
Thomaston, GA Micropolitan Statistical Area	27,700	27,153	+2.01%	328 sq mi (850 km^{2})	84/sq mi (33/km^{2})
Toccoa, GA Micropolitan Statistical Area	26,784	26,175	+2.33%	184 sq mi (480 km^{2})	146/sq mi (56/km^{2})
Total	6,930,423	6,020,643	+15.11%	12,250 sq mi (31,700 km^{2})	566/sq mi (218/km^{2})

== Municipalities ==
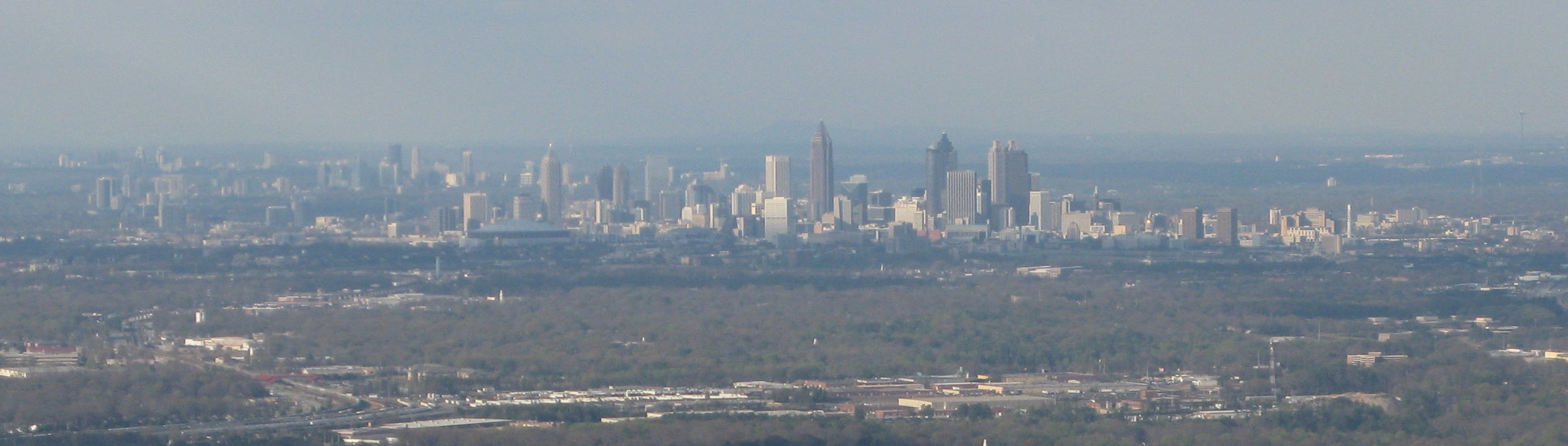
The skylines of Downtown, Midtown, Buckhead (all within the city of Atlanta), and Perimeter Center viewed from the southwest near Hartsfield–Jackson Atlanta International Airport

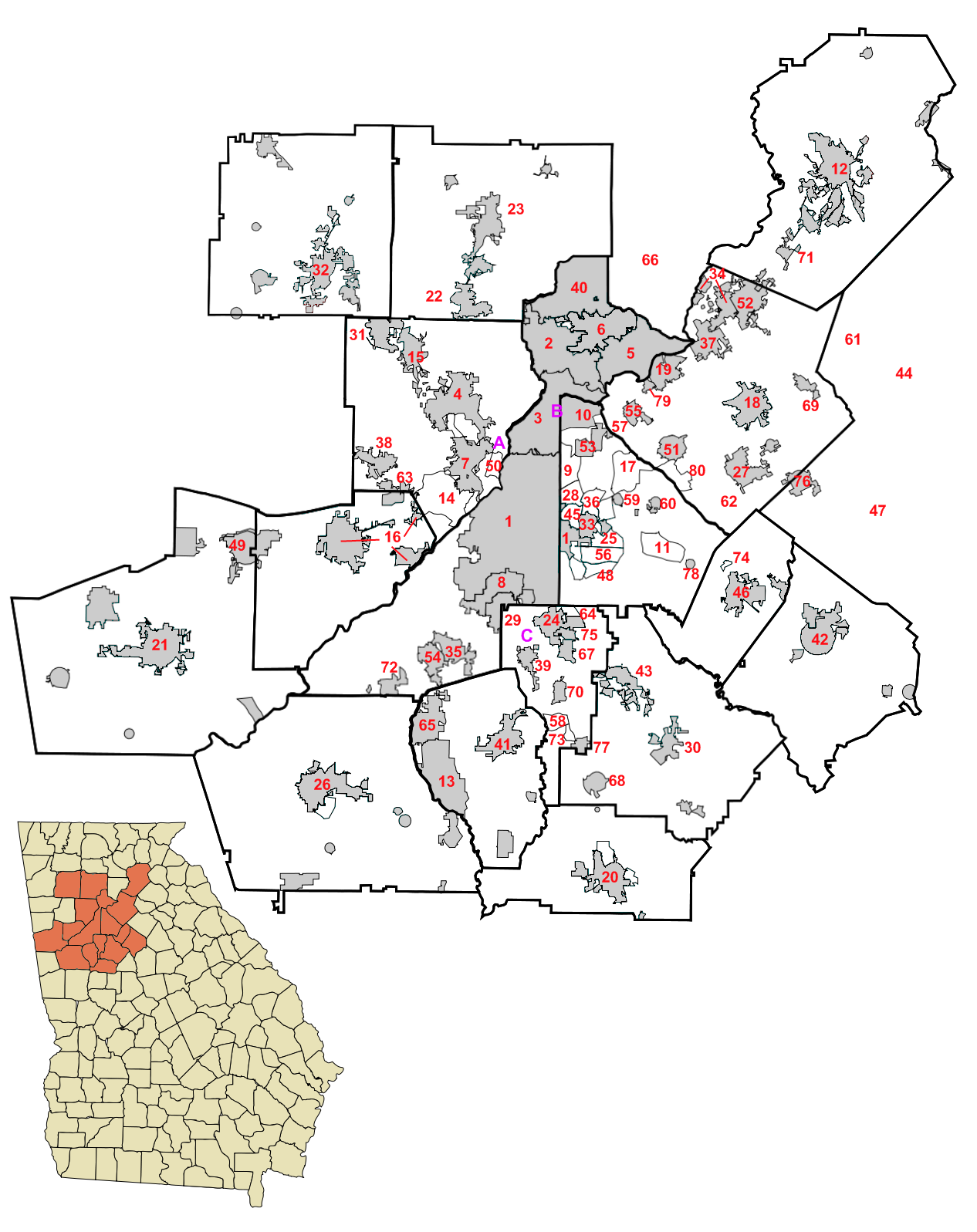
Atlanta suburbs and surrounding cities map. Note that the newly incorporated cities of Brookhaven, Peachtree Corners, Tucker, Stonecrest, South Fulton, Mableton and Chattahoochee Hills are not yet shown as incorporated (gray) on the map.

=== Edge cities ===
- Cumberland
- Perimeter Center
- Hartsfield-Jackson area
- Gwinnett Place/Sugarloaf area

More than one half of metro Atlanta's population is in unincorporated areas or areas considered a census-designated-place (CDP) by the census bureau. One notable example is East Cobb, an unincorporated area (though not a CDP) adjacent to Marietta and Roswell in Cobb County. With an estimated population of approximately 164,055 as of 2020, it would be the second largest city in the metro besides Atlanta if incorporated.

Metro Atlanta includes the following incorporated and unincorporated suburbs (both inside and outside Atlanta), exurbs, and surrounding cities, sorted by population according to 2020 census data (or later data if the city was incorporated after 2020 and census data is unavailable):

=== Cities and suburbs ===
Principal Cities

- Atlanta pop. 498,044
- Athens (included in CSA) pop. 127,315

Places with 100,000 to 399,999 inhabitants

- East Cobb (unincorporated) pop. 164,055
- Sandy Springs pop. 108,080
- South Fulton pop. 107,436

Places with 75,000 to 99,999 inhabitants

- Roswell pop. 92,833
- Big Creek (unincorporated) pop. 83,277
- Johns Creek pop. 82,453
- Mableton (incorporated 2022) pop. 78,000

Places with 50,000 to 74,999 inhabitants

- Lost Mountain (unincorporated) pop. 73,312
- Alpharetta pop. 65,818
- Marietta pop. 60,972
- Stonecrest pop. 59,194
- Smyrna pop. 55,663
- Brookhaven pop. 55,161
- Dunwoody pop. 51,683

Places with 25,000 to 49,999 inhabitants

- Ellenwood (unincorporated) pop. 46,967
- Bill Arp (unincorporated) pop. 44,518
- Peachtree Corners pop. 43,905
- Newnan pop. 42,549
- Gainesville (included in CSA) pop. 42,296
- Milton pop. 41,296
- East Point pop. 38,358
- Tucker pop. 35,322
- Woodstock pop. 35,065
- Douglasville pop. 34,650
- Peachtree City pop. 34,364
- Kennesaw pop. 33,036
- Canton pop. 32,973
- Chamblee pop. 32,251
- Duluth pop. 31,873
- Redan (CDP) pop. 31,749
- Lawrenceville pop. 30,629
- Silver City (unincorporated) pop. 29,495
- McDonough pop. 29,051
- Stockbridge pop. 28,973
- Union City pop. 26,830
- Carrollton pop. 26,738
- Sugar Hill pop. 25,076

Places with 24,999 or fewer inhabitants

- Decatur pop. 24,928
- Griffin pop. 23,478
- Clarkdale (unincorporated) pop. 23,401
- Cartersville pop. 23,187
- Candler-McAfee (CDP) pop. 22,468
- Acworth pop. 22,440
- Lathemtown pop. 21,110
- Suwanee pop. 20,786
- Snellville pop. 20,573
- North Druid Hills (CDP) pop. 20,385
- Forest Park pop. 19,932
- Fayetteville pop. 18,957
- Winder pop. 18,338
- North Decatur (CDP) pop. 18,511
- Conyers pop. 17,305
- Norcross pop. 17,209
- Buford pop. 17,144
- Villa Rica pop. 16,970
- Powder Springs pop. 16,887
- Lithia Springs (CDP) pop. 16,644
- Rex (unincorporated) pop. 16,580
- Fairburn pop. 16,483
- Riverdale pop. 15,129
- Belvedere Park (CDP) pop. 15,113
- Monroe pop. 14,928
- Clarkston pop. 14,756
- Druid Hills (CDP) pop. 14,568
- Lilburn pop. 14,502
- Covington pop. 14,192
- Loganville pop. 14,127
- Dallas pop. 14,092
- College Park pop. 13,930
- Braselton pop. 13,403
- Mountain Park (Gwinnett) (CDP) pop. 13,089
- Vinings (CDP) pop. 12,581
- Panthersville (CDP) pop. 11,237
- Doraville pop. 10,623
- Thomaston pop. 9,816
- Irondale (CDP) pop. 8,704
- Tyrone pop. 7,658
- Hampton pop. 6,987
- Auburn (CDP) pop. 6,887
- Barnesville pop. 6,775
- Austell pop. 6,581
- Morrow pop. 6,445
- Lovejoy pop. 6,422
- Hapeville pop. 6,373
- Conley (CDP) pop. 6,228
- Stone Mountain pop. 5,802
- Flowery Branch pop. 5,679
- Cumming pop. 5,430
- Locust Grove pop. 5,402
- Jonesboro pop. 4,724
- Palmetto pop. 4,448
- Dacula pop. 4,442
- Bonanza (CDP) pop. 3,135
- Avondale Estates pop. 2,960
- Lakeview Estates (CDP) pop. 2,695
- Grayson pop. 2,666
- Lake City pop. 2,612
- Chattahoochee Hills pop. 2,378
- Lithonia pop. 1,924
- Berkeley Lake pop. 1,574

== Geography ==
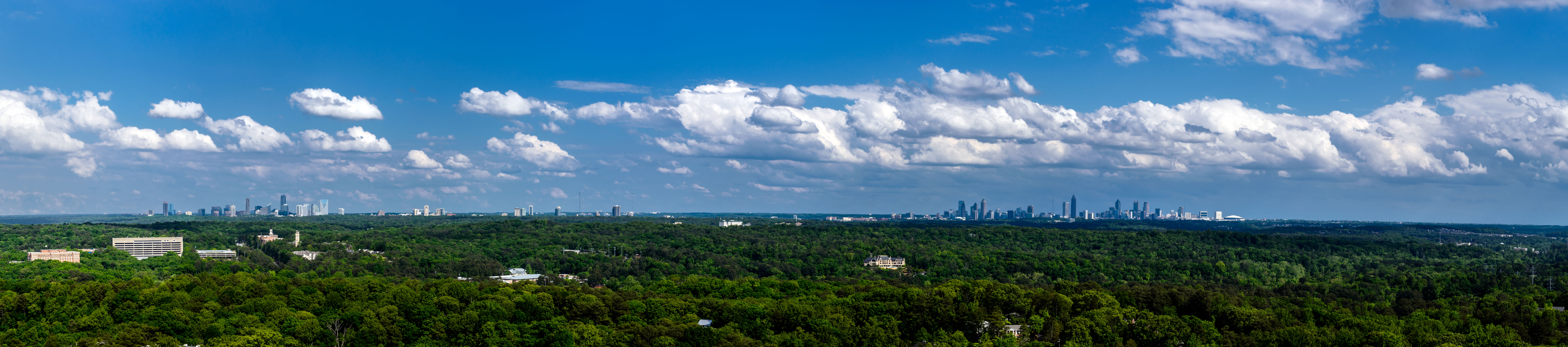
The topography and geography of Atlanta

Northern Suburbs: Sandy Springs, Roswell, Johns Creek, Alpharetta, Brookhaven, Dunwoody, Peachtree Corners, Milton, Woodstock, Canton, Duluth, Chamblee, Sugar Hill, Suwanee, Norcross, Buford, Holly Springs, Mountain Park (Gwinnett), Doraville, Ball Ground, Berkeley Lake, Nelson, Waleska, Mountain Park (Fulton/Cherokee), Rest Haven

Eastern Suburbs: Stonecrest, Tucker, Redan, Lawrenceville, Decatur, Candler-McAfee, Snellville, North Druid Hills, Conyers, North Decatur, Belvedere Park, Clarkston, Lilburn, Scottdale, Panthersville, Gresham Park, Druid Hills, Dacula, Stone Mountain, Grayson, Avondale Estates, Lithonia, Lakeview Estates, Pine Lake, Milstead

Southern Suburbs: South Fulton, East Point, Peachtree City, McDonough, Stockbridge, Union City, Forest Park, Fayetteville, Fairburn, Riverdale, College Park, Lovejoy, Locust Grove, Hampton, Irondale, Tyrone, Morrow, Conley, Hapeville, Palmetto, Jonesboro, Bonanza, Heron Bay, Chattahoochee Hills, Lake City, Brooks, Woolsey

Western Suburbs: Marietta, Smyrna, Mableton, Douglasville, Kennesaw, Acworth, Lithia Springs, Powder Springs, Vinings, Fair Oaks, Austell, Fairplay, Kennesaw State University, Dallas, Hiram

=== Topography and geology ===
The area sprawls across the low foothills of the Appalachian Mountains to the north and the Piedmont to the south. The northern and some western suburbs tend to be higher and significantly more hilly than the southern and eastern suburbs. The average elevation is around 1,000 feet (300 m).

The highest point in the immediate area is Kennesaw Mountain at 1,808 ft (551 m), followed by Stone Mountain at 1,686 ft (514 m), Sweat Mountain at 1,640 ft (500 m), and Little Kennesaw Mountain at 1,600 ft (488 m). Others include Blackjack Mountain, Lost Mountain, Brushy Mountain, Pine Mountain, and Mount Wilkinson (Vinings Mountain). Many of these play prominently in the various battles of the Atlanta campaign during the American Civil War. If the further-north counties are included, Bear Mountain is highest, followed by Pine Log Mountain, Sawnee Mountain, and Hanging Mountain, followed by the others listed above. Stone, Sweat, Bear, and Sawnee are all home to some of the area's broadcast stations.

The area's subsoil is a dense clay soil, colored rusty by the iron oxide present in it. It becomes very muddy and sticky when wet, and hard when dry, and stains light-colored carpets and clothing easily. It also tends to have a low pH, further aggravating gardeners. The fineness of it also means it is easily deposited into streams during heavy rains, creating silt problems where it is exposed due to construction. This transported red soil can be seen downstream on the riverbanks of south Georgia (where the native clay is white), and down to the Florida panhandle (where the native sand is also white). Topsoil is present only in natural forest areas, created by the decomposition of leaf litter.

==== Earthquakes and fault lines ====
An extinct fault line called the Brevard Fault runs roughly parallel to the Chattahoochee River, but as its last movements were apparently prehistoric, it is considered extinct and not a threat to the region. Still, minor earthquakes do rattle the area (and all of Georgia) occasionally. One notable one was in April 2003 (magnitude 4.6) coming from the northwest, its epicenter just across the state line in northeastern Alabama. While many people slept through the 5A.M. quake, it caused a minor panic in others completely unaware of what was happening. Similar earthquakes occur in this region called the Eastern Tennessee seismic zone, often felt much more widely across the stronger crust of eastern North America as compared to the west.

Thus, the 1886 Charleston, South Carolina earthquake was also felt in Atlanta and throughout the Southeast. It caused damage as far as central Alabama and West Virginia. Two small earthquakes were also felt on the southeast side near Eatonton in early April 2009. The New Madrid seismic zone (near the Missouri-Tennessee borders) and the seismic zone producing the 1886 magnitude 7.3 earthquake are still capable of producing moderate or major earthquakes, which the entire Atlanta area will feel moderately or even strongly.

=== Climate ===
The Atlanta metro area has a humid subtropical climate with four seasons. Summer is the longest. January daily lows average from 32–35 °F (0–2 °C) north to south, and highs range from 48–54 °F (9–12 °C), but often reach well above or below this average. There is an average annual snowfall of about 2.5 inches (6.4 cm), falling mostly from December through March, though there was snow north of the city on April 3, 1987. Snow flurries are actually common during the winter months when there is an especially deep trough in the jet stream. These events usually do not amount to more than a slight dusting and therefore go unrecognized in most weather summaries.

Summers are long and consistently hot and humid. July mornings average 71 °F (22 °C) and afternoons average 89 °F (32 °C), with slight breezes, and typically a 20–40% chance of afternoon thunderstorms. During the summer afternoon thunderstorms, temperatures may suddenly drop to 70–77 degrees with locally heavy rainfall. Average annual rainfall is about 50.2 inches (1,280 mm). Late winter and early spring, as well as July, are the wettest. Fall, especially October, is the driest.

From 1878 to 2011, the highest recorded temperatures at Atlanta were 105 °F (40.6 °C) on three days in the extraordinarily hot July 1980, followed by 104 °F (40 °C) that month and during a heat wave in August 2007, the hottest month ever for the area. This was broken on the last day of June 2012, when the temperature reached 106 °F (41.1 °C), during a massive heat wave that hit most of the country, with another 105 the next day tying the July record. The lowest recorded temperatures were −6 °F (−21 °C) and −8 °F (−22 °C) on January 20 and 21 of 1985, and −9 °F (−23 °C) on February 13, 1899, during severe cold snaps that went so far south they devastated the entire citrus industry in central Florida.

Hurricane Opal brought sustained tropical storm conditions to the area one night in early October 1995, uprooting hundreds of trees and causing widespread power outages, after soaking the area with rain for two days prior. Since 1950, some metro counties have been hit more than 20 times by tornadoes. Cobb (26) and Fulton (22) are two of the highest in the state. The Dunwoody tornado in early April 1998 was the worst tornado to have struck the area. A tornado struck downtown Atlanta in March 2008, causing a half-billion dollars in damage.

The area experiences a winter storm with significant snowfall about once each year. This can be extremely irregular, with several consecutive years receiving no measurable snow. A blizzard (see: 1993 Storm of the Century) caught much of the Southeast off-guard in 1993, dumping 4.5 inches (11.4 cm) at the Atlanta airport on March 13, and much more than that in the suburbs to the north and west, as well as in the mountains. The only other recorded winter storm of comparable severity was the Great Blizzard of 1899. The heaviest snow was in January 1940, when 8.3 inches (21.1 cm) buried the city during its coldest month on record. The second-heaviest was in 1983, when a very late storm dumped 7.9 inches (20.1 cm) on March 24. Ice storms have occurred in the area. The well-remembered 1973 ice storm was brutal, as was the storm in 1982.

The 2006–2008 Southeastern United States drought began with dry weather in 2006, and left area lakes very low. The drought began to abate significantly after the 2009 Atlanta floods, when some areas got up to 20 inches (500 mm) of rain in a week, with half of that falling in just 24 hours near the end of the period. The USGS calculated it to be a greater-than-500-year flood.

=== Environment ===
The area's prolific rains are drained by many different streams and creeks. The main basin is that of the Chattahoochee River, running northeast to southwest. The further northwestern suburbs drain into the Etowah River via the Little River and Lake Allatoona. The southern suburbs are drained by the Flint River, and the east-southeastern ones by the Oconee River and Yellow River.

By 2005 the metro area was using 360 million US gallons (1,400,000 m^{3}) of water per day (about 80 US gallons (300 L) per person per day) from these rivers. This usage was reduced by more than 10% during the drought, but soared back up after watering restrictions were eased (and before the flooding ensued). The need for water is seen as a barrier to further growth in the area, but permanent measures for non-emergency water conservation have never been put in place. The state legislature has refused to pass a requirement for low-flow toilets to be installed in homes that are sold, bowing to pressure from the real estate sales industry.

Disputes over water are becoming increasingly common, with both Alabama and Florida filing lawsuits and threatening injunctions to prevent Georgia from taking too much water, mostly for metro Atlanta. South Carolina also threatened when a pipeline east to the Savannah River was mentioned even informally. The state has now been ordered by a judge to reduce withdrawals from the Chattahoochee south of Lanier to 1970s levels within three years (2012), something that would create an immediate emergency water shortage if it were actually enforced.

==== Flora ====
The native forest canopy is mainly oak, redbud, hickory, poplar, tuliptree, pine, and sweetgum, with chestnut having been common decades before in what is now considered oak-hickory forest. Saw palmetto, Sabal palmetto and Trachycarpus fortunei have become common ornamentals as well. Traveling from the south, the metro area is generally the first area in which autumn leaf color can be seen, due to the different trees growing at the higher elevation and latitude. Underneath, the flowering dogwood is very common, the black cherry are quite prolific, with mulberry popping up sometimes as well. Sourwood is also in its native range, and is easily identified by the fact that it turns fiery red in early October, much brighter and weeks earlier than most other trees (which usually peak in early November).

Shrubby plants include blackberry, horsechestnut, sumac, and sometimes hawthorn. Virginia creeper, poison ivy, and briar are common vines. The Confederate yellow daisy is a wildflower native only to the area around Stone Mountain.

Common garden plants include dogwood, azalea, hydrangea, flowering cherry, maples, pin oak, red-tip photinia, holly, juniper, white pine, magnolia, Bradford pear, forsythia, liriope (mondograss), and English ivy. Lawns can be either cool-season grasses like fescue and rye, or warm-season like zoysia and bermudagrass which turn brown in late fall. A few homeowners associations actually prohibit green grass in the winter.

Native to the nearby mountains, maples are now one of the most common landscape trees for new homes and parking lots, giving their color in the fall instead of spring. When planted close to buildings (which provide shelter and radiate heat), they can retain some of their color into December, especially if November has been warm.

Common lawn weeds are mock strawberry, violet, wild onion, and of course the ubiquitous dandelion, crabgrass, and plantain.

By far the most notorious introduced species is kudzu, a highly invasive species from Japan which climbs and smothers trees and shrubs. New effective herbicides as well as increased development of formerly rural areas has greatly reduced kudzu in the metro area (although still quite common elsewhere in Georgia). Wisteria planted decades ago by farmers in then-rural areas has become wild and is common in undeveloped forests. Some vines exceed 50 years of age and cover dozens of acres of forest, creating a dense, purple explosion each spring.

Japanese honeysuckle is extremely common, its fragrance an early summer delight. A common ornamental shrub, the Chinese privet, has escaped to become the state's most invasive non-native plant species.

==== Fauna ====
Among mammals, the eastern gray squirrel is by far the most ubiquitous, stealing birdseed from the bird feeders which many locals maintain. Chipmunks and small brown rabbits are common, but it is relatively rare to hear of them doing any damage. Opossum, raccoons, foxes, coyotes and armadillos are frequently seen. Garden and meadow snakes are common; five venomous pit viper snakes (timber rattlesnake, pygmy rattlesnake, coral snake, water moccasin and copperhead) are indigenous, but reports of bites are rare. Many types of frogs, including tree frogs and bullfrogs, are easily heard in early summer, as are cicadas in July and August. Black bears occasionally wander down from the mountains, and white-tailed deer are abundant; overpopulated in some areas. Homeowners in the outer suburbs are prone to landscaping damage due to scavenging deer.

The most common birds are the brown thrasher (the GA state bird), American crow, European (or common) starling, American robin, mourning dove, house sparrow, northern cardinal, house finch, Carolina chickadee, tufted titmouse, bluejay, white-breasted nuthatch, eastern bluebird, mockingbird, brown-headed nuthatch, and Carolina wren. Birds of prey thrive in the area, with three varieties of hawks common near open fields in even the most populated areas. Falcons roost on skyscrapers in downtown Atlanta and can be regularly seen feasting on pigeons.

The American kestrel is sometimes seen. Late in the year, three species of owls can be heard nightly in wooded areas. Various woodpeckers can be seen in forested lots, including the red-bellied woodpecker, northern flicker (also known as the "yellow-shafted flicker"), and the downy woodpecker. The red-headed woodpecker is common in open fields and on golf courses. The American goldfinch is present mostly in winter, and the ruby-throated hummingbird only in summer.

== Demographics ==
Historical population
Census	Pop.	Note	%±
1900	419,375		—
1910	522,442		24.6%
1920	622,283		19.1%
1930	715,391		15.0%
1940	820,579		14.7%
1950	997,666		21.6%
1960	1,312,474		31.6%
1970	1,763,626		34.4%
1980	2,233,324		26.6%
1990	2,959,950		32.5%
2000	4,112,198		38.9%
2010	5,286,728		28.6%
2020	6,089,815		15.2%
2025 (est.)	6,482,182		6.4%
U.S. Decennial Census

Population density in the Atlanta urban area

Numerically, Metro Atlanta is the third fastest growing metropolitan area in the U.S. The 2020 census counted 6,089,815 people in the 28-county metro area. This was an increase of 803,087 from its 2010 population, representing growth of 15.2%. This was, however, a slower rate than the 28.6% increase recorded between 2000 and 2010.

Race, ethnicity, or foreign-born status	Pop. 2010	% of total 2010	Pop. 2000^{[A]}	% of total 2000	absolute change 2000–2010^{[B]}	% change 2000–2010^{[B]}
Total	5,268,860		4,112,198			
White only	2,920,480	55.4%	2,589,888	63.0%	330,592	12.8%
Non-Hispanic white only	2,671,757	50.7%	2,447,856	59.5%	223,901	9.1%
Black only	1,707,913	32.4%	1,189,179	28.9%	518,734	43.6%
Asian only and Pacific Islander only	256,956	4.9%	137,640	3.3%	119,316	86.7%
Asian Indian	108,980	1.5%	37,162	0.9%	41,818	112.5%
Korean	93,870	1.2%	22,317	0.5%	21,553	96.6%
Vietnamese	63,096	0.7%	23,564	0.6%	15,096	66.9%
Chinese	50,554	0.7%	22,097	0.5%	12,558	52.3%
Hispanic or Latino of any race	747,400	10.4%	268,851	6.5%	278,549	103.6%
Mexican	354,351	6.0%	165,109	4.0%	149,242	90.4%
Puerto Rican	43,337	0.8%	19,358	0.5%	23,979	123.9%
Cuban	17,648	0.3%	9,206	0.2%	8,442	91.7%
Foreign-born	916,434	13.6%	424,519	10.3%	291,915	68.8%

^{A} Atlanta MSA in 2000 did not include Butts, Dawson, Haralson, Heard, Jasper, Lamar, Meriwether, and Pike counties, whose population totalled in 2000: 135,783; in 2010: 156,368 (2.96% of total new 28-county metro)
^{B} Compares the larger 28-county Atlanta-Sandy Springs-Marietta MSA 2010 with a smaller 20‑county Atlanta MSA 2000; however the 8 new counties represent less than 3% of the larger 28‑county metro.
Source: for race and Hispanic population, U.S. Census Bureau 2010 and 2000 census; for foreign-born population: US Census Bureau 2010 and 2000 American Community Surveys; Immigrants in 2010 Metropolitan America, Brookings Institution

=== Race and ethnicity ===
White Americans made up 55.4% of metro Atlanta's population in 2010, a relative decrease from 63.0% ten years earlier, but in absolute numbers their population increased by over 330,000. Non-Hispanic whites proportionally dropped from 59.5% to 50.7% of the metro's population, while increasing by about 224,000.

Black Americans are the largest racial minority with 32.4% of the population in 2010. Metro Atlanta has the second largest African American population behind the New York metropolitan area. From 2000 to 2010, the geographic distribution of blacks in Metro Atlanta changed radically. Long concentrated in the city of Atlanta and DeKalb County, the black population there dropped as more than half a million African Americans settled across other parts of the metro area, including approximately 112,000 in Gwinnett County, 71,000 in Fulton outside Atlanta, 58,000 in Cobb, 50,000 in Clayton, 34,000 in Douglas, and 27,000 each in Newton and Rockdale counties.

Due to its availability of jobs, Atlanta has been a destination for young college-educated blacks in the Reverse Great Migration of African Americans from the North since the turn of the 21st century, with many settling quickly into suburban locations. The Atlanta metropolitan area has the second highest total African American population of any metropolitan area, with only the New York City metro area having more.

Year	Black pop. in City of Atlanta	Black pop. in DeKalb County	Total black pop. Atlanta + DeKalb	Total black pop. Metro Atlanta	Proportion of black pop. in Atlanta + DeKalb
2000	255,689	361,111	616,800	1,189,179	51.9%
2010	226,894	375,697	602,591	1,707,913	35.2%
2020	246,906	407,451	641,923	2,186,815	29.4%

Hispanic Americans are the fastest growing ethnic group in Metro Atlanta. At 10.4% of the metro's population in 2010, versus only 6.5% in 2000, the metro's Hispanic population increased an astounding 109.6%, or 298,459 people, in ten years. Major Hispanic groups include 354,351 Mexicans, 43,337 Puerto Ricans and 17,648 Cubans. All of those groups' populations increased by over 90% in the ten-year period. Of the metro's 299,000-person increase in the Hispanic population from 2000 to 2010, 98,000 were in Gwinnett County, 57,000 in Cobb, 55,000 in Fulton (all but 3,000 outside the city of Atlanta), 20,000 in Hall, and 15,000 in DeKalb County.

The Asian-American population also increased rapidly from 2000 to 2010. There were 296,956 Asian-Americans in the metro area in 2010, making up 5.9% of the population. This represented an 87% increase over 2000. The largest Asian groups are 108,980 Indian-Americans, 93,870 Korean-Americans, 67,660 Chinese-Americans, and 66,554 Vietnamese-Americans.

Atlanta also has Georgia's largest Bosnian-American population, with approximately 10,000 in the metro area, mainly in Gwinnett County.

Metro Atlanta has an increasingly international population, with 716,434 foreign-born residents in 2010, a 69% increase since 2000, with suburban Gwinnett County being one of the most diverse counties in the Southeastern United States. This was the fourth largest rate of growth among the nation's top 100 metros, after Baltimore, Orlando and Las Vegas. The foreign-born proportion of the population went up from 10.3% to 13.6%, and Atlanta moved up from 14th to 12th in ranking of U.S. metro areas with the largest immigrant population by sheer numbers. Still, its 13.6% proportion of immigrants is only the 29th highest of the nation's top 100 metros.

Metro Atlanta's immigrants are more suburban than those of most cities. Out of the top 100 U.S. metros, Atlanta has the 11th highest ratio of the foreign-born living in the suburbs and not in the core city. Atlanta has a few ethnic enclaves such as a Koreatown, and areas such as the Buford Highway Corridor in DeKalb County and parts of Gwinnett County are commercial centers for multiple ethnic communities.

In 1990, greater Atlanta had the largest Japanese population in the Southeast United States. The Consulate General of Japan in Atlanta estimated that, during that year, 7,500 to 10,000 Japanese lived in greater Atlanta. Of the metropolitan areas in the Southeast United States, as of 1990 greater Atlanta had the most extensive education network for Japanese nationals.

=== Language ===
In 2008, approximately 83.3% of the population five years and older spoke only English at home, which is roughly 4,125,000 people. Over 436,000 people (8.8%) spoke Spanish at home, giving Metro Atlanta the 15th highest number of Spanish speakers among American metropolitan areas (MSAs). Over 193,000 people (3.9%) spoke other Indo-European languages at home. People who speak an Asian language at home numbered over 137,000 and made up 2.8% of the population.

== Economy ==
The Atlanta area is home to 31 Fortune 1000 headquarters. 2022 rankings:

ATL rank	Company	City	Sector	Fortune rank
1	The Home Depot	Atlanta	Retail	17
2	United Parcel Service	Sandy Springs	Package delivery	34
3	Coca Cola Company	Atlanta	Beverage	93
4	Delta Air Lines	Atlanta	Airline	113
5	Southern Company	Atlanta	Energy	153
6	Genuine Parts / NAPA	Atlanta	Automotive parts	191
7	WestRock	Sandy Springs	Packaging	192
8	PulteGroup	Atlanta	Home building	267
9	Norfolk Southern	Atlanta	Railroad	332
10	AGCO	Duluth	Farm equipment	334
11	Newell Brands	Sandy Springs	Consumer goods	348
12	Asbury Automotive Group	Duluth	Automotive retail	360
13	Intercontinental Exchange	Sandy Springs	Information	459
14	Global Payments	Atlanta	Financial	407
15	Graphic Packaging	Sandy Springs	Packaging	466
16	NCR	Atlanta	Technology	466
17	Veritiv	Sandy Springs	Packaging / logistics	477
18	Equifax	Atlanta	Information	617
19	BlueLinx	Marietta	Building products	665
20	Carter's	Atlanta	Clothing	689
21	SiteOne Landscape Supply	Roswell	Landscape	756
22	Acuity Brands	Atlanta	Lighting	759
23	Floor & Decor	Smyrna	Flooring products	764
24	GMS	Tucker	Building products	786
25	FleetCor Technologies	Atlanta	Financial	868
26	Americold Realty Trust	Sandy Springs	Cold storage	893
27	Primerica	Duluth	Financial services	895
28	Rollins	Atlanta	Home services	930
29	Gray Television	Atlanta	Broadcasting	935
30	Saia	Johns Creek	Transportation	961
31	Beazer Homes USA	Sandy Springs	Home building	992

The Federal Reserve Bank of Atlanta is the sixth district of the 12 Federal Reserve Banks of the United States and is headquartered in midtown Atlanta. The Atlanta Fed covers the U.S. states of Alabama, Florida, and Georgia, the eastern two-thirds of Tennessee, the southern portion of Louisiana, and southern Mississippi as part of the Federal Reserve System.

=== Utilities ===
The area is the world's largest toll-free calling zone spanning 7,162 square miles (18,549 km^{2}), has four active telephone area codes, and local calling extending into portions of two others. 404, which originally covered all of northern Georgia until 1992, now covers mostly the area inside the Perimeter (Interstate 285). In 1995 the suburbs were put into 770, requiring mandatory ten‑digit dialing even for local calls under FCC rules. This made Atlanta one of the US's first cities to employ ten-digit dialing, which was begun by BellSouth the year before the Centennial 1996 Olympic Games.

In 1998, 678 was overlaid onto both of the existing 404 and 770 area codes. Mobile phones, originally only assigned to 404, may now have any local area code regardless of where in the region they were issued. Area code 470, the newest area code, was overlaid with 404 and 770 in the same fashion as 678. The local calling area also includes portions of 706/762 and a small area of 256 in Alabama on the Georgia border.

The city of Atlanta is the most wired city in the United States. Many residents access the internet on a high-speed broadband and/or WiFi connection. It is home to one of the world's largest fiber-optic bundles.

Major petroleum and natural gas pipelines cross the area, running from the Gulf coast, Texas, and Louisiana to the population centers of the Northeastern U.S. This includes Colonial Pipeline and Plantation Pipeline, both based in Alpharetta.

Metro Atlanta primarily uses natural gas for central heating and water heaters, with the major exception of heat pumps in apartments built during and since the 1980s. This is because winters are mild, and large apartment buildings usually require little energy to heat. Backup heat (also used during defrosting) is usually supplied by electric resistance heating, though some homes have hybrid heating units which use gas backup when it is cold. Exurban homes may also use all-electric instead of gas, if gas mains have not been extended to an area.

Cooktops and ovens are a mix of gas and electric, while gas clothes dryers are rather rare. Nearly all homes have a fireplace with a manual-valve gas starter, and some are now equipped with permanent gas logs with electric switch start. Some homes also have natural gas barbecue grills, formerly sold at utility company stores.

Georgia Power is the main electric power company across the state and the metro area, beginning in 1902 as Georgia Railway and Power Company, Atlanta's streetcar (trolley) company’s. Several electric membership corporations also serve the suburbs. These include the second-largest EMC in the nation in Jackson EMC, Cobb EMC, Walton EMC, and Sawnee EMC. The city of Marietta operates its own electric utility, Marietta Power, under the Board of Lights & Water. It is also a member of the Municipal Electric Association of Georgia.

Atlanta Gas Light is the natural gas utility for the region, and has been so for over a century and a half, since it installed gas lamps in Atlanta in 1856. It operated as a regulated monopoly until November 1998, the after the state legislature voted in early 1997 to deregulate natural gas marketing, and make customers choose among nearly 20 different marketers still selling the same AGL-wholesaled gas, such as Gas South, Infinite Energy, SCANA and Georgia Natural Gas. Most of the gas comes via pipeline from Louisiana.

Water is provided by various county and a few city systems. Several of these systems actually serve parts of neighboring counties and cities as well. The Cobb-Marietta Water Authority serves not only Cobb, but also parts of neighboring Paulding and Cherokee counties, for example. During drought or other emergency, cities and counties can enact outdoor water-use restrictions, however some cross-jurisdiction water systems have also acted to put bans in place. In late September 2007, the state Environmental Protection Division of the Georgia Department of Natural Resources, stepped-in with its first-ever ban, covering most of the northern half of the state. While surface water is by far the primary source of water for the region, the drought had many systems (and a few wealthy homeowners) drilling new wells for ground water, though the local water table is around 400 feet (120 m) deep, on average.

Sewerage is also handled by the water utilities, but the various water and sewer networks may not conform to the same boundaries, resulting in interbasin water transfers. This is for practical reasons, because the area is hilly and divided by several watersheds, because the area has developed irregularly and erratically, and because water treatment plants are usually not near sewage treatment plants. Septic tanks are still used in the older homes of some exurbs.

=== Housing ===
Low-density residential subdivision development dominates the metro Atlanta suburbs.

Changes in house prices for the metro area are publicly tracked on a regular basis using the Case–Shiller index; the statistic is published by Standard & Poor's and is also a component of S&P's 20‑city composite index of the value of the U.S. residential real estate market.

=== Community improvement districts ===
All of Georgia's community improvement districts are located in metro Atlanta.

- Buckhead Community Improvement District, covering Buckhead
- Perimeter Center Community Improvement Districts, covering the Perimeter Center area of Sandy Springs and Dunwoody/
- Cumberland Community Improvement District, around Cumberland Mall
- Town Center Area Community Improvement District, around Town Center at Cobb mall
- Gwinnett Place Community Improvement District, around Gwinnett Place Mall
- Gateway85 Community Improvement District, covering area southeast of Norcross
- Evermore Community Improvement District, or Highway 78 Community Improvement District, covering part of the Route 78 corridor in Gwinnett near Snellville
- Lilburn Community Improvement District, established early 2010 in Lilburn
- Aerotropolis Atlanta CIDs
- Boulevard CID (industrial district), created 2010

In May 2016, the City of Atlanta launched Atlanta City Studio, the city's first "pop-up urban design laboratory focused on shaping the future of city neighborhoods." The studio hosts "lectures, open forums, urban art presentations and other neighborhood and design components." Atlanta City Studio will relocate twice per year in order for residents to interact with staff and share their ideas about improving city design. The studio is located on the second floor of Ponce City Market and in January 2017 will relocate "to a retail location on the Westside, possibly on MLK Jr. Drive or Cascade Road."

== Education ==
=== Colleges and universities ===
- Agnes Scott College – Decatur
- Atlanta Metropolitan State College – Atlanta
- Atlanta Technical College – Atlanta
- Atlanta University Center – Atlanta
  - Clark Atlanta University
  - Morehouse College
  - Morehouse School of Medicine
  - Spelman College
- Brenau University – Gainesville
- Chattahoochee Technical College – Acworth and Marietta, Dallas
- Clayton State University – Morrow
- Columbia Theological Seminary – Decatur
- Emory University – Atlanta
- Georgia College & State University – Milledgeville
- Georgia Gwinnett College – Lawrenceville
- Georgia Tech – Atlanta
- Georgia Piedmont Technical College – Clarkston
- Georgia State University – Atlanta
  - Perimeter College – Alpharetta, Clarkston, Covington, Decatur and Dunwoody
- Gwinnett Technical College – Lawrenceville
- Interdenominational Theological Center – Atlanta
- John Marshall Law School – Atlanta
- Kennesaw State University – Kennesaw and Marietta
- Lanier Technical College – Gainesville, Cumming, Winder, Dawsonville and Commerce
- Life University – Marietta
- Mercer University – Atlanta
- Morris Brown College – Atlanta
- Oglethorpe University – Brookhaven
- Oxford College – Oxford
- Reinhardt University – Waleska
- Savannah College of Art and Design – Atlanta
- Southern Crescent Technical College – Griffin
- University of North Georgia – Gainesville
- University of West Georgia – Carrollton and Newnan
- West Georgia Technical College – Carrollton, Douglasville, Newnan and Waco

=== School districts ===
- Atlanta Public Schools
- Barrow County Schools
- Bartow County School District
- Buford City School District
- Butts County School District
- Carroll County School District
- Carrollton City School District
- Cartersville City School District
- Cherokee County School District
- Clayton County Public Schools
- Cobb County Public Schools
- Coweta County School System
- Dawson County School District
- Decatur City School District
- DeKalb County School System
- Douglas County School District
- Fayette County School System
- Forsyth County Schools
- Fulton County Public Schools
- Gainesville City School District
- Griffin-Spalding County School District
- Gwinnett County Public Schools
- Hall County School District
- Haralson County School District
- Heard County School District
- Henry County School District
- Jasper County School District
- Lamar County School District
- Marietta City School District
- Meriwether County School District
- Morgan County School District
- Newton County School District
- Paulding County School District
- Pickens County School District
- Pike County School District
- Rockdale County School District
- Social Circle City School District
- Walton County School District

== Government and politics ==
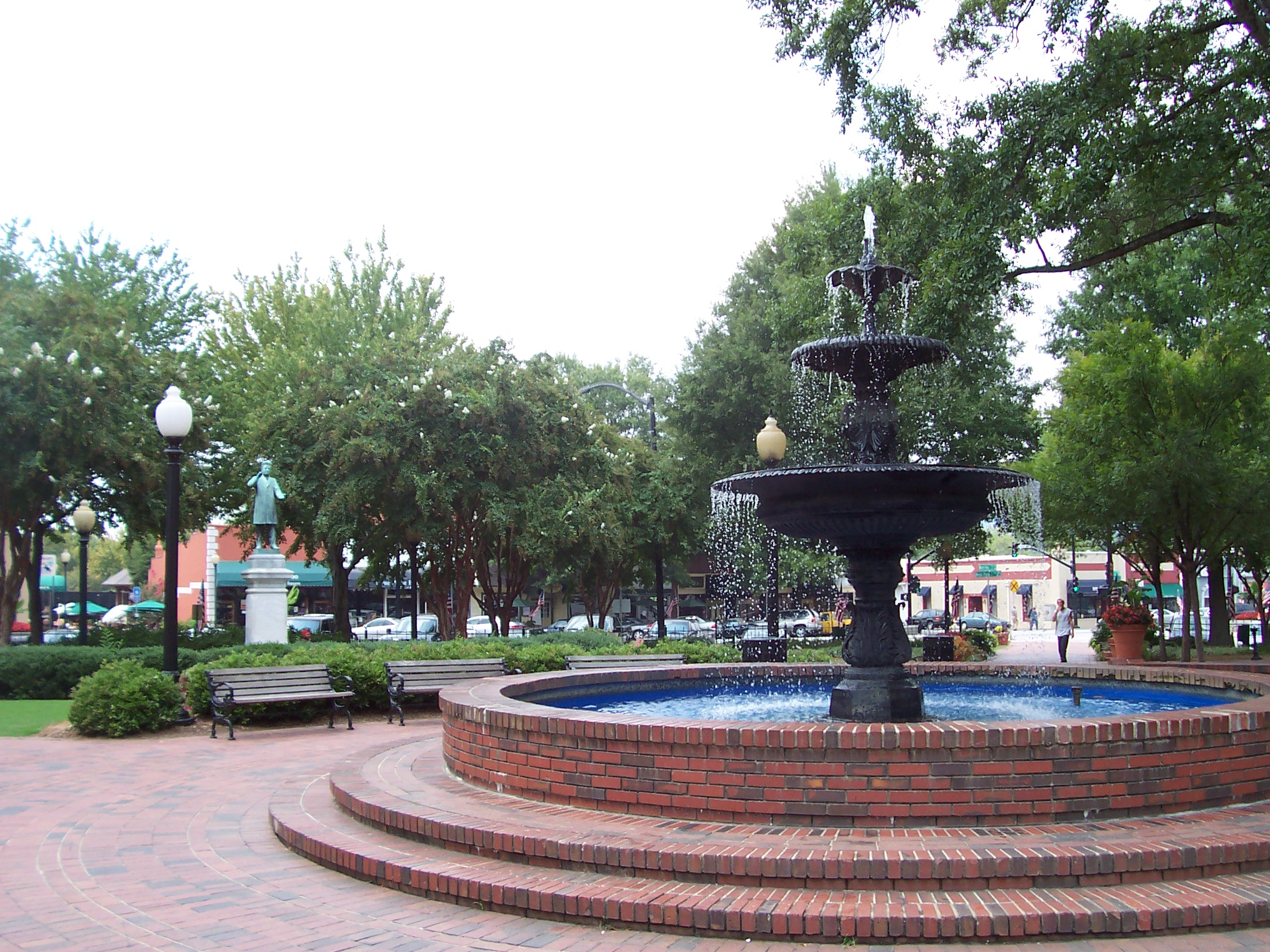
Downtown Marietta's historic town square

In geographic terms, Georgia has the smallest average county size of any state. This focuses government more locally but allows greater conflict between multiple jurisdictions, each with its own agenda.

The first significant intergovernmental agency in metro Atlanta was the Metropolitan Atlanta Rapid Transit Authority, which runs the MARTA public transportation system. Alongside other factors such as race and class, as well as a lack of planning and perceived lack of need, problems associated with the inner city of Atlanta (crime, poverty, and poor public school performance) influenced Cobb, Gwinnett, and Clayton county voters to refuse to allow construction of MARTA into their respective counties during the 1970s. These decisions resulted in permanent effects on land development in the region, making use of private automobiles even more of a necessity.

The Atlanta Regional Commission is so far the closest that the area has come to a metropolitan government. It approves only those projects deemed to have a positive effect beyond the immediate area in which they are to be constructed. The Georgia Regional Transportation Authority is somewhat of a cross between ARC and MARTA, working to improve mobility, air quality, and land use practices in the region. GRTA also operates Xpress buses from 11 counties, and could operate commuter rail service in the future. Currently, plans for commuter rail and eventual intercity rail (including the long-proposed but still unfunded Atlanta Multimodal Passenger Terminal) are the responsibility of the Georgia Rail Passenger Authority, which receives almost no funding.

Since 2007 proposals have been floated to allow new multi-county sales taxes, in addition to existing county sales taxes for roads, to pay for regional transportation initiatives.

Politics

Due to demographic shifts and population increases in the region, Metro Atlanta has trended toward the Democratic Party, so much so that Democrats have been able to win statewide due to turnout from this area. In 2020, Joe Biden won the area by 15.4 points, enough to narrowly capture the state's 16 electoral votes.

In 2020 and 2022, Democrats Jon Ossoff and Raphael Warnock successfully won full terms to represent the state in the U.S. Senate, mainly due to winning by large margins in Metro Atlanta.

Presidential election results
Year	DEM	GOP	Others
2024	56.5% 1,741,454	42.6% 1,312,157	1.4% 28,161
2020	57.0% 1,684,934	41.6% 1,229,242	1.4% 39,950
2016	52.3% 1,250,397	44.2% 1,057,123	3.5% 82,781
2012	49.4% 1,108,989	49.0% 1,099,845	1.5% 34,208
2008	51.3% 1,153,849	47.7% 1,074,509	1.0% 22,898
2004	44.1% 818,067	55.2% 1,023,670	0.7% 13,661
2000	44.4% 631,882	52.5% 746,974	3.1% 43,635
1996	46.1% 565,241	47.3% 579,727	6.6% 81,199
1992	43.3% 521,891	43.4% 522,934	13.4% 161,013
1988	39.5% 358,191	59.8% 542,979	0.7% 6,516
1984	38.0% 322,409	61.9% 524,579	0.0% 354
1980	52.5% 381,253	43.1% 312,920	4.4% 32,160
1976	63.9% 417,621	35.8% 233,778	0.3% 1,917
1972	27.4% 142,069	72.3% 374,580	0.3% 1,653
1968	30.3% 150,806	36.6% 182,609	33.1% 165,093
1964	50.2% 218,167	49.8% 216,221	0.0% 42
1960	59.0% 163,034	40.9% 113,022	0.0% 91

== Healthcare ==
The area is served by a network of healthcare facilities including private practice, urgent care, hospital systems, and specialty care facilities. There are approximately 37 hospitals serving the metro. There are both private for profit systems and community not-for-profit systems.

=== Hospitals with # beds ===
Trauma Centers - Level I * ; Level II **

Children's Healthcare of Atlanta

- Arthur M Blank Hospital - Brookhaven - 446 *
- Hughes Spalding Hospital - Atlanta - 82
- Scottish Rite Hospital - Sandy Springs - 319

Emory Healthcare

- Emory University Hospital - Atlanta - 733
- Emory University Hospital-Midtown - Atlanta - 511
- Emory University Hospital-Wesley Woods - Atlanta - 71
- Emory University Orthopedic and Spine Hospital - Tucker - 75
- Emory Decatur Hospital - Decatur - 422
- Emory Hillandale Hospital - Lithonia - 90
- Emory Johns Creek Hospital - Johns Creek - 118
- Emory Saint Joseph's Hospital - Sandy Springs - 410

Grady Memorial Hospital - Atlanta - 974 *

Northeast Georgia Medical Center - Gainesville - 872 **

Northside Hospital System

- Northside Hospital Atlanta - Sandy Springs - 621
- Northside Hospital Cherokee - Canton - 126
- Northside Hospital Duluth - Duluth - 81
- Northside Hospital Forsyth - Cumming - 304
- Northside Hospital Gwinnett - Lawrenceville - 353 **

Piedmont Healthcare

- Piedmont Atlanta Hospital - Atlanta - 512
- Piedmont Eastside Hospital - Snellville - 287
- Piedmont Fayette Hospital - Fayetteville - 290
- Piedmont Henry Hospital - Stockbridge - 341
- Piedmont Mountainside Hospital - Jasper - 52
- Piedmont Newnan Hospital - Newnan - 154
- Piedmont Newton Hospital - Covington - 94
- Piedmont Rockdale Hospital - Conyers - 138
- Piedmont Walton Hospital - Monroe - 77

Shepherd Center - Atlanta - 152

Wellstar Health System

- Wellstar Cobb Hospital - Austell - 387
- Wellstar Douglas Hospital - Douglasville - 102
- Wellstar Kennestone Hospital - Marietta - 662 *
- Wellstar North Fulton Hospital - Roswell - 202 **
- Wellstar Paulding Hospital - Hiram - 294
- Wellstar Spalding Regional Hospital - Griffin - 160

Veterans Administration Health Care

- Veterans Administration Medical Center - Decatur

== Media ==
=== Radio ===
- WABE 90.1
- WSB-FM B98.5
- Q99.7, 99.7
- Star 94, 94.1
- The River, 97.1
- V-103, 103.3
- El Patron 105.3
- Radio 105.7
- Kiss 104.1
- 96.1 The Beat
- praise 102.5
- Bull 94.9
- 99X 100.5
- hot 107.9
- 104.7 Air1
- 106.7 K-Love
- 92.9 The Game WZGC
- WSB Radio 95.5FM and 750AM
- WREK 91.1 - Georgia Tech's Student Radio

=== TV - Broadcast ===
- WSB-TV 2 ABC
- WAGA-TV 5 Fox
- WGTV 8 GPB
- WXIA-TV 11 NBC
- WPCH-TV 17 The CW
- WUVG-TV 34 Univision
- WATL-TV 36 MyNetworkTV
- WANF-TV 46 Independent
- WUPA-TV 69 CBS

=== TV - Cable ===
- CNN
- Turner Broadcasting
- The Weather Channel
- Georgia Public Broadcasting (PBS), 9 stations
- Adult Swim

=== Print ===
- Atlanta Business Chronicle
- The Atlanta Journal-Constitution
- Atlanta Magazine
- Atlanta Parent
- The Atlantan
- Gwinnett Daily Post
- Jezebel
- Marietta Daily Journal

== Culture and attractions ==
=== Professional sports teams ===
Club	Sport	League	Venue	City	Since	Titles
Atlanta Braves	Baseball	Major League Baseball	Truist Park	Cumberland	1966	2 (1995, 2021)
Gwinnett Stripers	Baseball	International League (AAA)	Coolray Field	Lawrenceville	2009	
Atlanta Falcons	American football	National Football League	Mercedes-Benz Stadium	Atlanta	1966	
Atlanta Gladiators	Ice hockey	ECHL	Gas South Arena	Duluth	2003	
Atlanta Hawks	Basketball	National Basketball Association	State Farm Arena	Atlanta	1968	
Atlanta Dream	Basketball	Women's National Basketball Association	Gateway Center Arena	College Park	2008	
College Park Skyhawks	Basketball	NBA G League	Gateway Center Arena	College Park	2019	
Atlanta United FC	Soccer	Major League Soccer	Mercedes-Benz Stadium	Atlanta	2017	1 (2018)
Atlanta United 2	Soccer	MLS Next Pro	Fifth Third Bank Stadium	Kennesaw	2017	

Former teams include the Atlanta Flames (now Calgary Flames) and Atlanta Thrashers (now Winnipeg Jets), both of the National Hockey League.

Atlanta also plays host to two NASCAR Cup Series races each year at Atlanta Motor Speedway.

The Atlanta metropolitan area is also home to three NCAA Division I programs, with the Georgia Tech Yellow Jackets and Georgia State Panthers in Atlanta proper and the Kennesaw State Owls in Kennesaw. Both Georgia Tech and Georgia State are members of the Football Bowl Subdivision in the Atlantic Coast Conference and Sun Belt Conference, respectively, while Kennesaw State is a member of the ASUN Conference in the Football Championship Subdivision; however, Kennesaw State accepted an invitation to move up to the FBS level from Conference USA starting in 2024.

=== Performing arts venues ===
- Atlanta Symphony Hall
- Alliance Theater
- Cobb Energy Centre
- Fox Theatre
- Infinite Energy Arena
- Sandy Springs Performing Arts Center
- Spivey Hall

=== Museums ===
- Center for Puppetry Arts
- Children's Museum of Atlanta
- Delta Flight Museum
- Fernbank Museum of Natural History
- Fernbank Science Center
- High Museum of Art
- Jimmy Carter Library and Museum

=== Amusement ===
- College Football Hall of Fame
- Georgia Aquarium
- Medieval Times Dinner & Tournament
- National Center for Civil and Human Rights
- Six Flags Over Georgia
- Six Flags White Water
- World of Coca-Cola
- Zoo Atlanta

=== Parks ===
- Atlanta Botanical Garden
- The Beltline
- Centennial Olympic Park
- Chastain Park
- Chattahoochee River National Recreation Area
- Clayton County International Park/The Beach
- Freedom Park
- Grant Park
- Historic Fourth Ward Park
- Kennesaw Mountain National Battlefield Park
- Piedmont Park
- Stone Mountain
- Woodruff Park

=== Festivals ===
- Music Midtown

=== Other ===
- CNN Center

== Military presence ==
- Dobbins Air Reserve Base
- Fort Gillem, closed
- Fort McPherson, closed

== Transportation ==
The U.S. Census Bureau has defined a metropolitan area for Atlanta which includes, but is not limited to, Roswell, Georgia and Sandy Springs, Georgia. According to the 2016 American Community Survey, about 78% of working metropolitan residents commuted by driving alone, 9% carpooled, 3% used public transportation, and 1% walked. Less than 1% of working residents commuted by bicycle, while about 2% of commuters traveled by all other means. About 7% of residents worked at home.

=== Transit systems ===
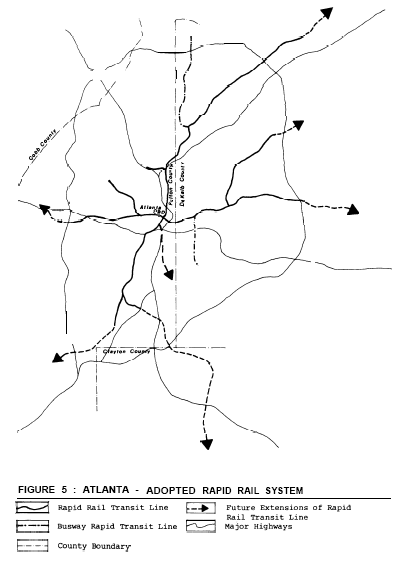
Map of the initial plan of the MARTA system from 1976

Atlanta has always been a rail town, and the city once had an extensive streetcar system, which also provided interurban service as far out as Marietta, 15 miles (24 km) to the northwest. The streetcars were replaced by an extensive trolleybus system, supplemented by buses, in the 1940s and 1950–52, and then converted to all buses in the 1950s and 1960–62. However, building a modern rapid transit system proved a difficult and drawn-out process and, compared to the original plans for a regional system, has only partially been accomplished.

MARTA operates buses and a subway system in the city of Atlanta, Fulton, Clayton, and DeKalb counties, while Cobb and Gwinnett counties operate their own independent Suburban Transit Systems that feed into MARTA. This is a result of those counties' refusal to join the MARTA system (Gwinnett voted in March 2019 to reject MARTA again), a situation which was originally closely related to white flight from the city. It is the only US system in which the state does not provide any funds for operation or expansion, instead relying entirely on a 1% sales tax in its three counties. Due to the passage of a 1% sales tax in Clayton County on November 4, 2014, MARTA replaced the defunct C-Tran system bringing buses and commuter rail to the county beginning March 2015, with full bus service in 2016. The Atlanta Streetcar, a 2.7-mile (4.3 km) light rail loop, connects Centennial Olympic Park and MARTA heavy rail subway to the Sweet Auburn district and points in between. Xpress GA, a suburban commuter bus service operated by the Georgia Regional Transportation Authority or GRTA, has over 32 routes running from the suburbs and exurbs to downtown Atlanta in 12 metropolitan counties.

Plans are underway for commuter rail and bus rapid transit, though these are some years away. The $20 billion Northwest Corridor HOV/BRT project appears to conflict with other plans, such as the metro-wide Concept 3 approved by the Transit Planning Board, and the no-barrier HOT lanes on I‑85 in Gwinnett. MARTA is also considering a BRT line of its own to the east.

The first commuter rail line would run south of the city, eventually extended to Lovejoy and possibly Hampton near Atlanta Motor Speedway. The "Brain Train" would likely be the second route, connecting the University of Georgia in Athens to Emory University and Georgia Tech in Atlanta.

As planned, all commuter trains would arrive at the Atlanta Multimodal Passenger Terminal (MMPT), the long-delayed facility just across Peachtree Street from the Five Points MARTA station, where all of its lines meet. Planning for the system and its extension as intercity rail across the state are the responsibility of the Georgia Rail Passenger Authority.

Another proposed plan that has received very strong grassroots support in recent years is the BeltLine, a greenbelt and transit system that takes advantage of existing and unused rail tracks to set up a 22-mile (35 km) light rail or streetcar circuit around the core of Atlanta, as well as establishing more green space and footpaths for pedestrians and bicyclists.

=== Commercial railways ===
Before Atlanta was even a city, it was a railroad hub. From this came the joke, popular among other Southerners, that "regardless of whether one goes to heaven or hell, everyone must go through Atlanta first". Many of its suburbs pre-date it as depots or train stations along the major lines in and out of town.

Many of these historic stations, including Atlanta's Union Station and Terminal Station, were demolished like many county courthouses and other historic buildings. Many have been saved however, including the L&N station in Woodstock, and the stations along the main W&A line in Marietta and Smyrna.

Through mergers, the main railroads in the area are now Norfolk Southern and CSX. The Georgia Northeastern Railroad is a short line that also services part of the area. There are also several railyards of Atlanta and vicinity, as well as the Southeastern Railway Museum and the Southern Museum of Civil War and Locomotive History.

The National Railroad Passenger Corporation, more commonly known as Amtrak, runs the intercity rail line Crescent through Metro Atlanta twice daily, with one train heading towards New Orleans and the other headed towards New York. All trains make a scheduled stop at Peachtree Station in northern Midtown Atlanta, but it is also possible for arrange for trains to stop in Gainesville, Georgia as well.

=== Air ===
Hartsfield-Jackson Atlanta International Airport is the world's busiest airport and is the only international airport for the region (and only major international airport for the state).

Domestic-only carriers from Atlanta:

- Alaska Airlines
- American Airlines
- Avelo Airlines
- JetBlue Airways
- Spirit Airlines
- Southern Airways Express
- Sun Country Airlines
- United Airlines

Domestic and international from Atlanta:

- Delta Air Lines
- Frontier Airlines
- Southwest Airlines

Foreign-based international carriers:

- Aeromexico (Joint venture with Delta Air Lines)
- Air Canada
- Air France (Joint venture with Delta Air Lines)
- British Airways
- Copa Airlines
- Ethiopian Airlines
- KLM Royal Dutch Airlines (Joint venture with Delta Air Lines)
- Korean Air (Joint venture with Delta Air Lines)
- Lufthansa German Airlines
- LATAM Airlines (Joint venture with Delta Air Lines)
- Qatar Airways
- Scandinavian Airlines
- Turkish Airlines
- Virgin Atlantic (Joint venture with Delta Air Lines)
- WestJet (Joint venture with Delta Air Lines)

Other airports (maintained by local counties) include Charlie Brown Field (Fulton), McCollum Field (Cobb), Cartersville Airport (Bartow), DeKalb Peachtree Airport (DeKalb), Briscoe Field (Gwinnett), Coweta County Airport (Coweta), Cherokee County Airport (Cherokee), Atlanta Speedway Airport (Henry), and Paulding County Airport (Paulding). Former local airports were Stone Mountain Airport and Parkaire Field, among others.

DeKalb Peachtree Airport is the primary business jet airport. This is due to its proximity to Downtown, Midtown, Buckhead, and the Perimeter office areas.

=== Roads and freeways ===
Atlanta is served by three major interstate highways. Including tributaries, they are the following:

(Note: The cities used below are also the control cities used for the Metro Atlanta Bypass/I-285 signs entering from the suburbs.)

I-75 passes through from Macon to the south, and from Chattanooga to the north. I-575 is a spur which merges with I‑75 near Kennesaw. I‑575 serves northeast portions of Cobb County and a large portion of Cherokee County. It ends in Ball Ground. I-675 is a route which connects I‑75 in Henry County to I‑285 in southern Dekalb County. Most of the corridor is within Clayton County.

I-85 passes through from Montgomery on the southwest and from Greenville on the northeast. I-75 merges with I-85 to form the Downtown Connector from the Brookwood Interchange, just north of Midtown Atlanta, to just south of the Lakewood Freeway in South Atlanta. I-185 is a spur which merges with I‑85 in LaGrange and stretches southward to Columbus. I-985 is a spur which merges with I‑85 in Suwanee and serves the northern suburbs of Gwinnett and Hall counties. It terminates just northeast of Gainesville.

I-285 is the beltway which encircles the city and its immediate eastern suburbs. It is commonly known as the Perimeter. I‑285 passes through Clayton, Cobb, Fulton, and DeKalb counties.

I-20 passes through from Birmingham to the west and from Augusta to the east. It serves Douglasville, the major suburb west of Atlanta. It serves Lithonia and Conyers to the east.

Atlanta is also served by several other freeways, in addition to the interstate highways, including:

Route 400 is the main corridor serving the north-central suburbs, and was the only toll road in the metropolitan Atlanta area. As of November 23, 2013, the tolls ended and the toll plazas were demolished. It reaches into the northern portion of Fulton County and gradually turns northeast before entering Forsyth County. The controlled-access portion terminates just northeast of the city of Cumming. To the south, it terminates and merges into southbound I‑85 just south of the Buckhead business district. Cumming/Dahlonega is used on I‑285 as the northbound sign, and Atlanta/Buckhead as the southbound. From I‑85 northbound, it uses Buckhead/Cumming.

Stone Mountain Freeway, or Route 78, is an 8‑mile corridor east of Downtown Atlanta and the neighboring suburb of Decatur. It serves northeast portions of Dekalb County, including the city of Stone Mountain. It continues east as a divided highway into southern part of Gwinnett County, including the suburbs of Lilburn, Snellville and Loganville. Route 78 also stretches east to Athens.

Lakewood Freeway, or Route 166, extends between Lakewood Park in south Atlanta and Campbellton Road, just west of I‑285.

Peachtree Industrial Blvd, or Route 141, is a route north-northeast of Atlanta which begins on the north side of I‑285 and runs parallel to I‑85 for about four miles until it terminates when it splits into Route 141 and Peachtree Industrial Boulevard (continuing as a normal divided highway).

Route 316 is a four-mile-long route that branches from I‑85 and stretches eastward into Gwinnett County. It continues east as a normal divided highway through the suburb of Lawrenceville and on to Athens.

There are many historic roads across the area, named after its mills and early ferries, and the bridges later built to replace the ferries. Pace's Ferry is perhaps the best known.

Owing to the area's long history of settlement and uneven terrain, most arterial roads are not straight but meander instead, which can be confusing as much as the famed proliferation of Atlanta streets with "Peachtree" in the name. It is also often joked that half the streets are named Peachtree, while the other half have several names to make up for it.

Partly, confusion is because the region maintains the historic nomenclature of each county naming its roads for the towns they connect with in surrounding counties. Thus, from Dallas to Roswell, Route 120 is Marietta Highway to the Paulding/Cobb county line, is Dallas Highway to the city of Marietta, Whitlock Avenue to the town square, South Park Square for just one city block, Roswell Street to Cobb Parkway (at the Big Chicken), Roswell Road to the Cobb/Fulton county line, and finally Marietta Street to the town square in Roswell. Further confusion is from the arbitrary location of state routes by the Georgia Department of Transportation, so that they travel an erratic path requiring several turns by drivers instead of traveling the original straight route; and the renaming of roads by state legislators to honor their friends.

There are many roads like this throughout the area, leading to duplication of names in different counties. In Fulton, "Roswell Road" refers to Georgia 9 through northern Atlanta and across Sandy Springs, in addition to the above-mentioned use in Cobb, for example. Numeric street addressing is done by county as well, with the origin usually being at one corner of the town square in the county seat. The U.S. Postal Service ignores these actual and logical boundaries however, overlapping ZIP codes and their associated place names across counties. The Cumberland/Galleria area has Cobb's numbers and an "SE" suffix, but is called "Atlanta" by the USPS (despite being Vinings, which the USPS ironically calls "unacceptable"), which can confuse visitors to think it is far away in southeast Atlanta.

Where more than one town in the same county has a road to the same place, the smaller towns have their own name prefixed to it, while the county seat does not. The road need not go directly to the other place, but may connect through other roads. Examples include Due West Road west from Marietta, Kennesaw Due West Road southwest from Kennesaw, and Acworth Due West Road south from Acworth. Some are usually hyphenated, like Peachtree-Dunwoody Road, Ashford-Dunwoody Road, Chamblee-Dunwoody Road, and Chamblee-Tucker Road.

There are also several roads named for communities which have been overwhelmed by the urban and suburban sprawl, and so are somewhat odd to newcomers. These include Sandy Plains, Crabapple, Toonigh, Luxomni, and Due West. Some of these communities are in the middle of the road, while some are at or very near one end. Some areas are renamed, either over time (Sandy Plains gradually became "Sprayberry" when Sprayberry High School moved there and similarly named shopping centers popped up around it); by the USPS (Toonigh is identified as "Lebanon"), or after rapid development. In such cases, the roads usually maintain their historic names even if the neighborhoods do not.

There are also a few U.S. highways that cross the area, including 19, 23, 29, 41, and 78.

Other arterials are completely new, like much of Barrett Parkway, Sugarloaf Parkway and South Fulton Parkway, constructed by their counties but partly covered with a state route number. Occasionally, roads are realigned or extended to meet each other directly at a cross-road, leading to odd curves and name changes.

== See also ==
- North Georgia
