= Northside Hospital Atlanta =

- Northside Hospital System
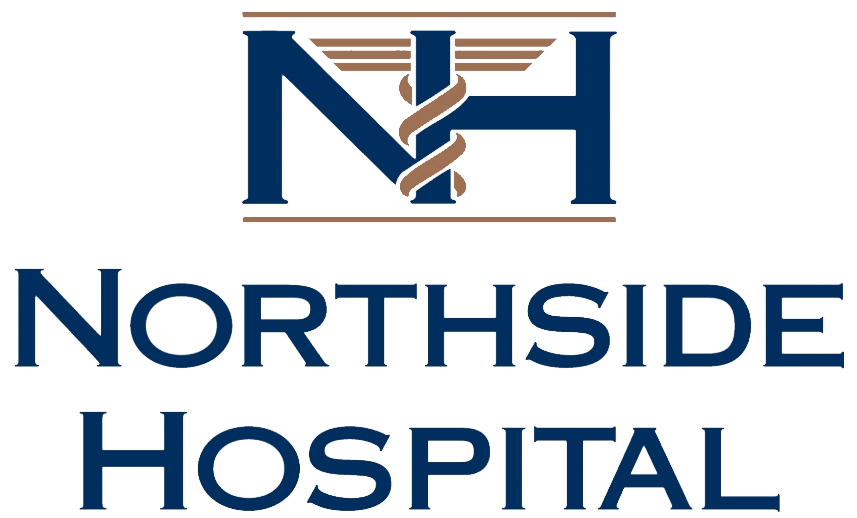

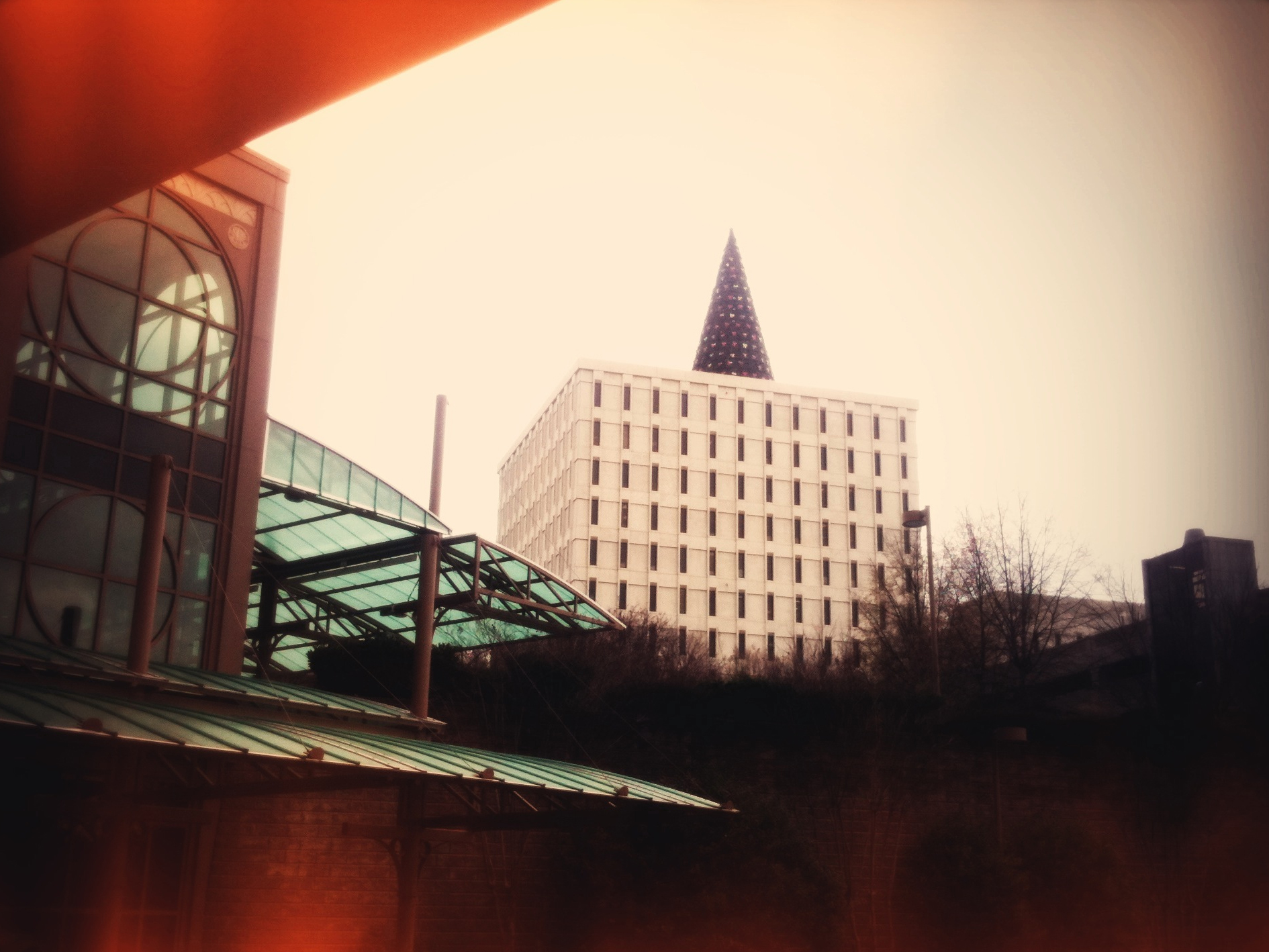
- Northside Atlanta in 2011

Geography
- Location: 1000 Johnson Ferry Road NE; Sandy Springs, Georgia, United States
- Coordinates: 33.90901°N 84.35394°W

Organization
- Type: General

Services
- Standards: Level IV Maternal Center
- Beds: 621

Helipads
- Helipad: FAA LID: GA55
Number	Length		Surface
Number	ft	m	Surface
H1	60	18	Concrete

History
- Former name: Northside Hospital
- Opened: July 6, 1970; 56 years ago

Links
- Website: www.northside.com/locations/northside-hospital-atlanta
- Lists: Hospitals in Georgia

Northside Hospital Atlanta (originally Northside Hospital; sometimes Northside Atlanta) is a hospital serving the metro Atlanta area located in the "Pill Hill" neighborhood in Sandy Springs, Georgia. Opened in 1970, the hospital is the flagship and original location of the Northside Hospital System; as of 2023, it has 621 beds and employs 2,300 physicians and over 11,000 staff. Northside Atlanta delivers the most babies of any hospital in the United States.

== History ==
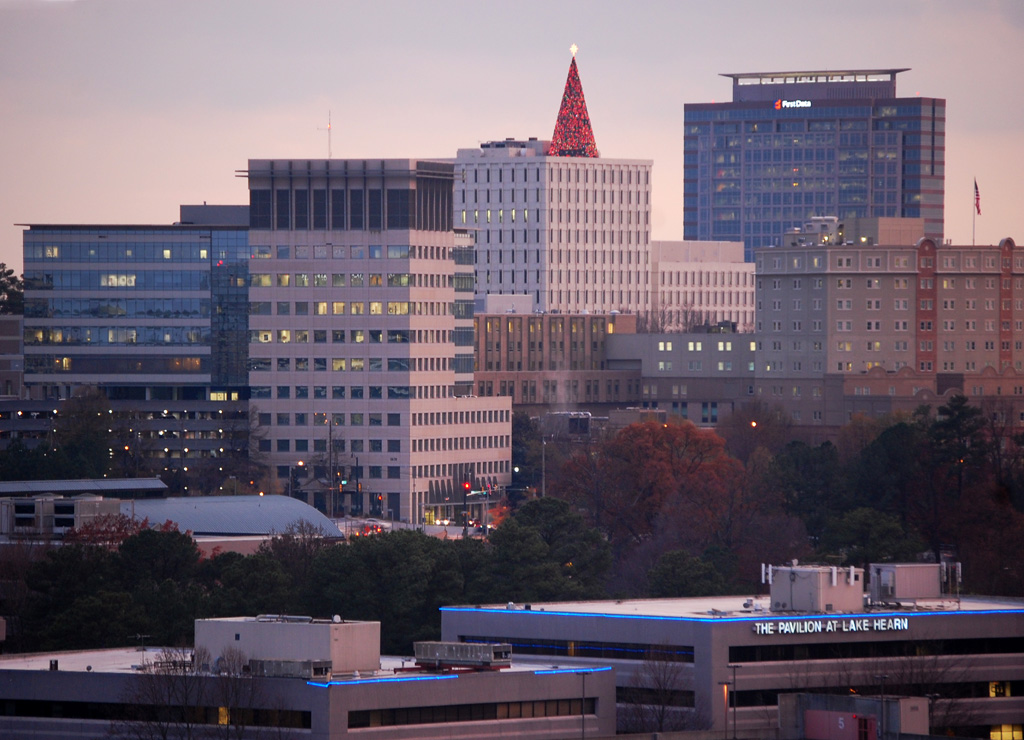
Northside Atlanta (with Christmas tree on top) in 2009

Northside Hospital opened on July 6, 1970. The hospital had 288 beds, 80 doctors, and around 400 employees.

The hospital is owned by the Hospital Authority of Fulton County.

In May 1999, Northside's Women's Center opened to the public.

Northside Atlanta expanded in 2018 with the eight-story East Tower, which added 81 beds to the hospital's capacity. The new tower's patient pickup and dropoff motor lobby area features a mural by contemporary Atlanta artist Ryan Coleman.

In 2023, Northside Atlanta became the first hospital in the country to receive a level IV verification from the Joint Commission's Maternal Levels of Care program.
