= TPB =

TPB may stand for:

== Organizations ==
- Town Planning Board, in Hong Kong
- Transit Planning Board, in Atlanta, Georgia, US
- Transports publics biennois, a public transport operator in Biel/Bienne, Switzerland

== Other uses ==
- The Pirate Bay, online index of movies, music, video games, pornography and software
- Theory of planned behavior, a psychological theory
- Thorpe Bay railway station, Essex, England, station code TPB
- Trade paperback, a type of paperback book
- Trailer Park Boys, a Canadian mockumentary television series
- Triple phase boundary, a geometrical class of phase boundary
- 1,1,4,4-Tetraphenylbutadiene, an electroluminescent dye

== See also ==
- TPB AFK, a 2013 film about The Pirate Bay trial
