= Northside Hospital System =

Hospital network in Georgia, United States

Coordinates: 33°54′32″N 84°21′16″W

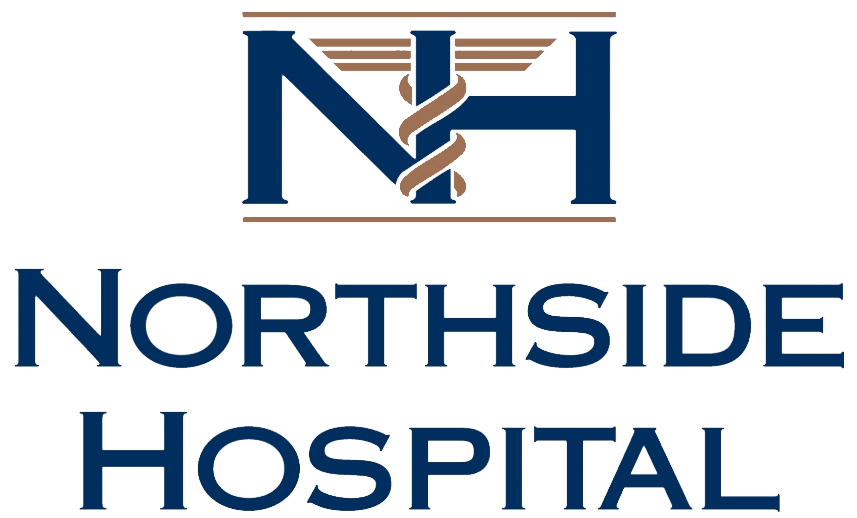
- Established: 1970
- Subsidiaries: Northside Hospital Atlanta; Northside Hospital Cherokee; Northside Hospital Duluth; Northside Hospital Forsyth; Northside Hospital Gwinnett
- Address: 1000 Johnson Ferry Road NE; Sandy Springs, Georgia
- Location: Atlanta metropolitan area, Georgia, United States
- Interactive map of Northside Hospital System
- Website: northside.com

The Northside Hospital System (Northside) is a hospital network in the Atlanta metropolitan area, Georgia, United States. Its specialties include oncology, gynecology, neurology, orthopedic surgery, and gastroenterology.

Northside operates five hospitals across the metro area: Northside Hospital Atlanta, Northside Hospital Cherokee, Northside Hospital Duluth, Northside Hospital Forsyth, and Northside Hospital Gwinnett. Northside operates 54 urgent and primary care centers as well.

== History ==
Northside Hospital purchased Baptist Medical Center in Cumming, Georgia on October 1, 2002, which was renamed Northside Hospital Forsyth.

Northside Medical Midtown opened in Atlanta in November 2018.
