= State and Experimental Aviation Point Location Index =

Russian state aviation unique identifier

State and/or Experimental Aviation Point Location Index (Russian: Индекс (указатель) местоположения пункта государственной и/или экспериментальной авиации) is a four-letter unique identifier assigned to the location of Russia's state aviation points (air bases, commandant's offices of airfields and airports, points of deployment of aviation units at joint-use airports, aviation control points, aviation training grounds and sports airfields), as well as experimental aviation points (experimental airfields, aviation factories).

These indices are used to transmit aeronautical information about state airfields, airspace use requests, designation of military and sports airfields on air navigation maps. Indices are assigned by the Ministry of Defense and are not ICAO airport codes, although they use a similar format. If a state airfield has an ICAO index, a joint use by civil aviation is permitted.

Indices of state airfields are intended only for internal use within Russia. They have an external resemblance to ICAO codes for the location of Russian airports, but unlike them, they begin with the letter "Ь" when using Cyrillics or with the letter "X" when using Latin alphabet (letter "X" is not used as ICAO prefix and ICAO codes for Russia start with letter "U"). Indices cannot be used outside Russia via AFTN.

== See also ==
- Location identifier
- ICAO airport code
- List of airports by ICAO code: U

== Sources ==
"Сборник четырехбуквенных указателей (индексов) местоположения аэродромов, полигонов и посадочных площадок". Центр аэронавигационной информации. 2024-04-18.
