= Town Center Area Community Improvement District =

Town Center Community Improvement District
- Company type: Not-for-Profit
- Industry: Transportation, Community Improvement
- Founded: 1997
- Headquarters: Atlanta, Georgia
- Key people: Kelly Keappler, Chairman of the Board
- Number of employees: Five (2019)
- Website: http://towncentercid.com

Town Center Community Improvement District (Town Center CID) is a self-taxing district in unincorporated Cobb, the Town Center CID region is an area of 6.25 square miles, lying roughly within Cobb Parkway to the west, Chastain Road and McCollum Parkway to the north, Bells Ferry Road to the east, and Barrett Parkway to the south. The Town Center CID, was established in 1997 to promote infrastructure improvements. In 2000, a resolution was passed at the annual meeting to expand the purposes of the Town Center CID, allowing the CID to provide additional services and facilities for parks and recreation areas, as well as land use planning, development and improvement consistent with Cobb County’s coordinated and comprehensive planning.

A seven-member board of directors governs the Town Center CID. The property owners elect six directors and the Cobb County Board of Commissioners appoints the seventh director. The board elects its own officers annually.

The commercial properties in the Town Center CID pay an additional 5 mills on their property tax to advance road projects, sidewalks and other improvements to provide accessibility and mobility within the Town Center area. The Town Center CID has a six-year life span and is currently in its fourth term (2016-2021).

Revenue for the Town Center CID is based on the Cobb County Tax digest.

The Town Center CID completed a Master Plan, the Roadmap, in 2004 and updated the plan in 2006 and again in 2017. The plan integrates transportation, land use, market conditions, and implementation guidelines for the Town Center Area.

Also completed in 2004, was a Livable Center Initiative (LCI) study, called Supurb. The LCI study was funded through the Atlanta Regional Commission (ARC) for local jurisdictions to develop transportation-efficient land use plans that promote development and redevelopment in regional activity centers.

== History ==
The Town Center Community Improvement District was founded upon the basis of Article 9, Section VII of the Georgia Constitution. One of the oldest CIDs, the TCACID was established in 1997. It is now in its fourth six-year term (2016-2021).

The Town Center CID supports local-area improvements through public-private partnerships. In 2000, its scope was expanded from primarily a focus on transportation, to one also providing for park and recreation areas and facilities, plus land-use planning, development and improvement

The Town Center CID continues to provide significant funding for major improvements to the area, through projects that often qualify for other sources of funding once initiated locally. To date, the Town Center CID has been able to leverage some $56 million in funding to advance as much as $163 million in transportation and quality of life projects by working closely with local, state and federal organizations.

== Town Center CID Projects ==
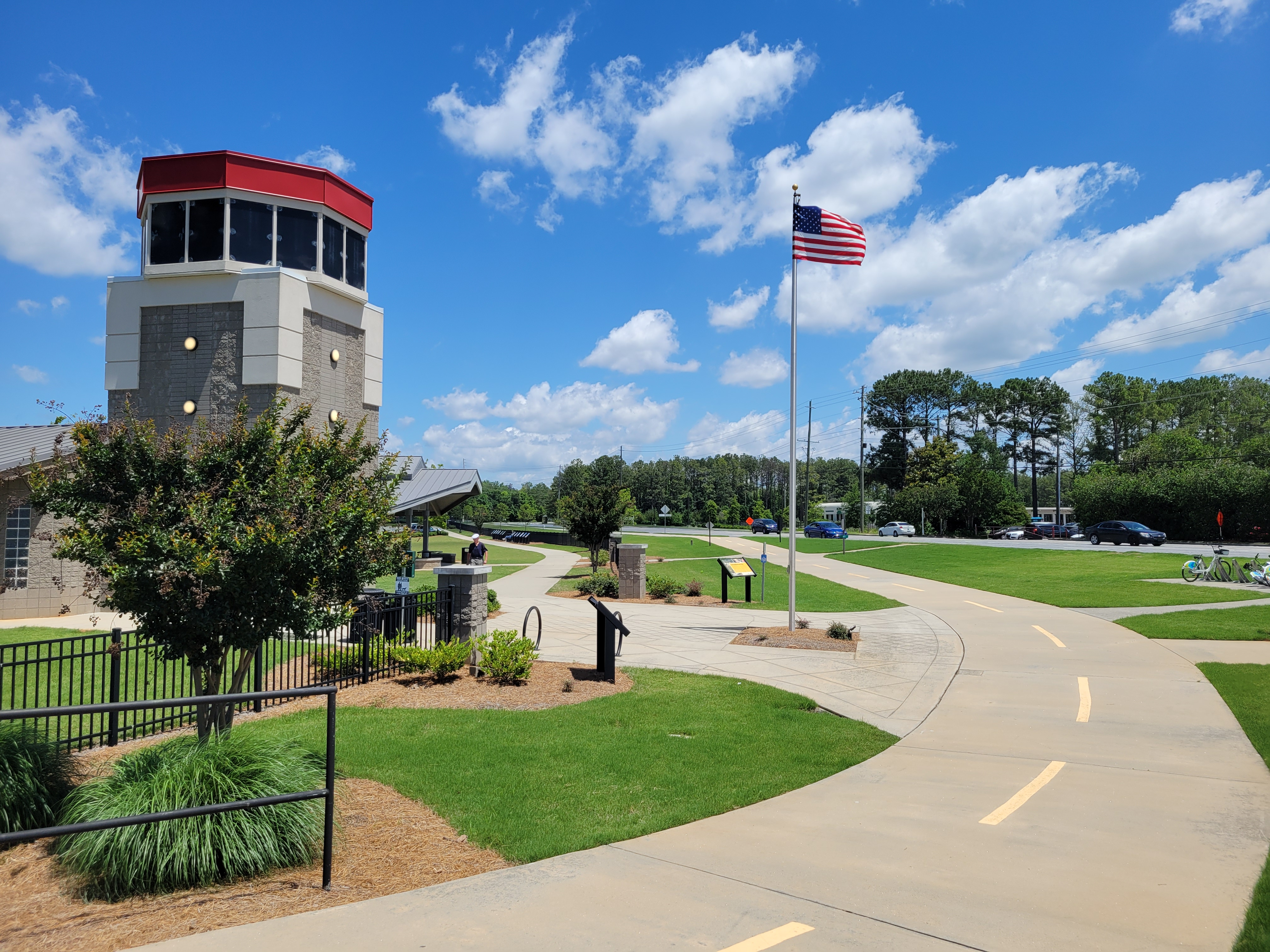
Noonday Creek Trail at Aviation Park, two of the CID projects

- The project basically reconnects old Big Shanty Road, which was divided by the creation of I75, providing an alternative route to the Chastain Road.
- The Noonday Creek Multi-use trail is a continuation of the existing Mountain to River trail that currently ends at Kennesaw Mountain National Battlefield Park.
- The Town Center CID began a mission several years ago to install Wayfinding signs to assist vehicles and pedestrians in finding their way into and around the area.
- Landscape Enhancements and Beautification in and by the TCACID
- This proposed project is a new bridge over I-75 that connects Frey Road to Busbee Drive just north of Chastain Road. A roundabout is proposed at the intersection of the Skip Spann Connector and Busbee Drive.
- South Barrett Reliever between Barrett Lakes Boulevard and Chastain Meadows Parkway
