= Cumberland Community Improvement District =

Self-taxing district in Georgia, US

- Type: Not-for-Profit
- Industry: Transportation, Community Improvement
- Founded: 1988
- Headquarters: Atlanta, Georgia
- Key people: Bob Voyles, chairman of the board Kim Menefee, executive director
- Number of employees: 6 (2026)
- Website: http://www.cumberlanddistrict.org

The Cumberland Community Improvement District (CID) is a self-taxing district covering 6.5 square miles (17 km^{2}) in southern Cobb County, Georgia, that includes the intersections of I-75, I-285 and U.S. Highway 41. The Cumberland CID, Georgia’s first CID, was formed by business leaders interested in improving access to the highways for Atlanta’s emerging northwest market, known as Cumberland.

Commercial property owners within the Cumberland area fund the Cumberland CID by paying an additional five mils of property taxes. Cobb County collects the taxes and distributes those funds to the CID, which in turn provides funding to start the necessary planning process for roads, streetscapes, trails and other infrastructure improvements, while federal, state and county dollars pay for the bulk of project construction.

== History ==
The Cumberland CID was founded upon the basis of Article 9, Section VII of the Georgia Constitution. The amendment providing for CIDs was approved by the voters in 1984. The Cumberland CID was brought into being through the enactment of a resolution by the Cobb County Commission and the consent of the Cumberland area’s commercial property owners in 1988.

As of 2010, the CID has leveraged $89 million into more than $500 million for area improvements. At the close of 2009, each dollar raised by the CID brought in $7 from public sources, for a portfolio of active projects worth more than an estimated $230 million. By 2012, the Cumberland CID expects to have raised $100 million in local funds.

== CID Projects ==
- Completion of the $300 million Cumberland Boulevard loop road that connects all four quadrants of the district and includes the Kennedy Interchange, Cumberland Boulevard, Windy Ridge Parkway and Mill Green Parkway.
- Construction of the $85 million Kennedy Interchange.
- Formation and administration of Commuter Club, a commuter services program for area businesses and employees.
- Completion of streetscapes and multi-use trails that connect to the regional network; more than $25 million in streetscape and landscape beautification projects in the center of the Cumberland community.
- Reconstruction of the Paces Ferry Interchange and a portion of the East-West Connector
- Completion of the Silver Comet Cumberland Connector Trail
- Completion of Blueprint Cumberland I. and II
- Completion of a transit study that launched the state’s current initiatives to bring transit and High Occupancy Vehicle (HOV) lanes to the I-75 and I-285 corridors.

== Commuter Club ==
In 1996, the Cumberland CID created the Cumberland Transportation Network (CTN), a transportation management authority (TMA), to address ways of reducing traffic in the area CTN assisted companies inside the improvement district with developing and implementing commute-option programs for their employees.

The program, currently known as Commuter Club, identifies potential carpool and vanpool partners and offers the latest information and services to help the approximately 70,000 employees in the Cumberland area save money on transit or set up teleworking and flextime program at work sites.

In 2003, the U.S. Environmental Protection Agency named the Cumberland office market one of nation's "Best Workplaces for Commuters" for the commuter services provided through Commuter Club. "Best Workplaces for Commuters" is a national designation reserved for businesses, organizations and districts that meet a national standard of excellence in commuter benefits.

In June 2008, Commuter Club crested 100 vans becoming the largest TMA-sponsored vanpool program in the country.

Today, commuters from 17 metro Atlanta counties rely on Commuter Club’s vanpool program to make their trip to and from work less expensive and more enjoyable every day. Commuter Club’s efforts remove more than 1,000 cars from the roads daily, saving more than $7,000 per year in commuting costs and eliminating more than 30,000 vehicle miles daily.
