= Transit Planning Board =

The Transit Planning Board was a joint commission of the Atlanta Regional Commission (ARC), Georgia Regional Transportation Authority (GRTA), and Metropolitan Atlanta Rapid Transit Authority (MARTA).

The TPB partnership was founded in 2006, holding its first meeting on February 16, adopting bylaws on April 20, and adopting a work plan on August 17. It states that it "is a partnership leading the establishment and maintenance of a seamless, integrated transit network for the Atlanta region.

Specifically, TPB will:

- Develop a regional transit plan including a comprehensive financial plan;
- Work to improve regional service coordination, including integrating fares, marketing and customer information;
- Measure system performance; and,
- Advocate for increased federal funding for regional transit."

== Members ==
Some of the following may have changed since 2007.

=== Agency representatives ===
- GDOT Chair, Gena Abraham
- GRTA Chair, Walter Deriso
- MARTA Acting Chair, Michael Walls
- MARTA General Manager, Beverly Scott

=== Local elected officials ===
- Atlanta Mayor, Shirley Franklin
- Cherokee County Chair, Buzz Ahrens
- Clayton County Chair, Eldrin Bell, TPB vice-chairman
- Cobb County Chair, Sam Olens
- DeKalb County CEO, Vernon Jones
- Douglas County Chair, Tom Worthan
- Fayette County Chair, Jack Smith
- Fulton County Chair, John Eaves
- Gwinnett County Chair, Charles Bannister
- Henry County Chair, Jason Harper
- Rockdale County Chair, Roy Middlebrooks
- Spalding County Chair, Eddie Freeman

=== Appointees of the governor of Georgia ===
- Douglas Tollett
- Lara O’Connor Hodgson
- Pam Sessions

It does not have any representatives from CobbLinc, Ride Gwinnett, or Connect Douglas, the local suburban bus systems.

== Concept 3 ==
Concept 3 is the third and final draft of a plan to build an extensive network of commuter rail, light rail, and bus rapid transit by 2030, totaling about 500 miles or 800 kilometers. It was finalized in July 2008 and adopted in August 2008.
