= Stone Mountain Airport =

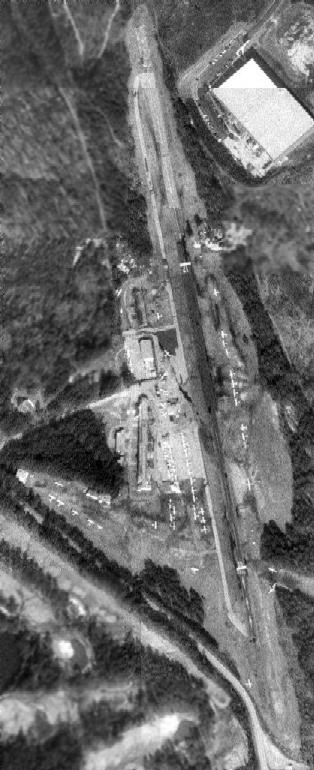
- 1993 USGS aerial photo
- IATA: none; ICAO: none; FAA LID: former 00A

Summary
- Airport type: Public-use (closed)
- Owner: Mark Britt
- Operator: Stone Mountain Aviation Inc.
- Location: Stone Mountain, Georgia
- Coordinates: 33.81°N 84.12°W
- Interactive map of Stone Mountain Airport

Runways
Direction	Length		Surface
Direction	ft	m	Surface
17/35	3,000/2,700	910/820	Paved
12/30?	unk.	unk.	Grass

The Stone Mountain Airport (FAA LID: 00A), later also known as Stone Mountain Britt Memorial Airport (after the owner's wife), was a small privately run public-use airport located in Stone Mountain, Georgia (east-northeast of the mountain), United States, from around 1962 until 1996. Used for general aviation, it had a paved runway of either 2,700 feet (820 m) or 3,000 feet (910 m), and a "crosswind" grass runway of unknown length. The fixed-base operator was Stone Mountain Aviation Inc.

It was closed prior to the Centennial 1996 Summer Olympics in nearby Atlanta. By the 2000s, the hangars and other buildings had been removed. It is now used for R/C plane hobbyists. Its FAA location ID is now used at an R/C heliport in Bensalem, Pennsylvania.
