= Hybrid heat =

Type of domestic heating

A hybrid heat system reacts to changes in temperature and automatically adjusts to the method available to heat or cool a house. It requires a furnace with a heat pump.

== Mechanics ==
A heat pump can be used to cool or heat a house. The heat pump transfers heat by transmitting of R-410A refrigerant.

Hybrid heat works with gas furnace and electric heat pump systems or using a variable-speed fan. Variable-speed fans use direct-current-electronically commutated motors (ECM).

== Energy consumption ==
A heat pump can reduce electricity use by up to 40% by transferring heat instead of making heat with fuel, for example a gas furnace.
