= Location identifier =

Identifier for air navigation and weather stations

A location identifier is a symbolic representation for the name and the location of an airport, navigation aid, or weather station, and is used for staffed air traffic control facilities in air traffic control, telecommunications, computer programming, weather reports, and related services.

== ICAO location indicator ==
The International Civil Aviation Organization establishes sets of four-letter location indicators which are published in ICAO Publication 7910. These are used by air traffic control agencies to identify airports and by weather agencies to produce METAR weather reports. The first letter indicates the region; for example, K for the contiguous United States, C for Canada, E for northern Europe, R for the Asian Far East, and Y for Australia. Examples of ICAO location indicators are RPLL for Manila Ninoy Aquino Airport, KCEF for Westover Joint Air Reserve Base and EGLL for London Heathrow Airport.

== IATA identifier ==
The International Air Transport Association uses sets of three-letter IATA identifiers which are used for airline operations, baggage routing, and ticketing. There is no specific organization scheme to IATA identifiers; typically they take on the abbreviation of the airport or city such as MNL for Manila Ninoy Aquino Airport.

In the United States, the IATA identifier usually equals the FAA identifier, but this is not always the case. A prominent example is Sawyer International Airport in Marquette, Michigan, which uses the FAA identifier SAW and the IATA identifier MQT.

== FAA identifier ==
The Federal Aviation Administration location identifier (FAA LID) is a three- to five-character alphanumeric code identifying aviation-related facilities inside the United States, though some codes are reserved for, and are managed by, other entities.

For nearly all major airports, the assigned identifiers are alphabetic three-letter codes, such as ORD for Chicago O'Hare International Airport. Minor airfields are typically assigned a mix of alphanumeric characters, such as 8N2 for Skydive Chicago Airport and 0B5 for Turners Falls Airport. Private airfields are assigned four-character identifiers, such as 1CA9 for Los Angeles County Fire Department Heliport. The location identifiers are coordinated with the Transport Canada Identifiers described below.

In general, the FAA has authority to assign all three-letter identifiers (except those beginning with the letters K, N, W, and Y), all three- and four-character alphanumeric identifiers, and five-letter identifiers for the United States and its jurisdictions. The Department of the Navy assigns three-letter identifiers beginning with the letter N for the exclusive use of that department. Transport Canada assigns three-character identifiers beginning with Y. The block beginning with letter Q is under international telecommunications jurisdiction, but is used internally by FAA Technical Operations to identify National Airspace equipment not covered by any other identifying code system. The block beginning with Z identifies United States Air Route Traffic Control Centers.

In practice, the assigned identifiers are not always consistent with the current "encoding" rules adopted by the FAA, nor are all the assigned identifiers distinct between the United States and Canada. The coding system has evolved over time, and to ensure safety and reduce ambiguity, many "legacy" codes have remained intact, even though they violate the currently ordered rules. For this reason, the FAA regularly publishes detailed listings of all codes it administers.

=== General assignment patterns ===
In general, three-letter identifiers are assigned as radio call signs to aeronautical navigation aids; to airports with a staffed air traffic control facility or navigational aid within airport boundary; to airports that receive scheduled route air carrier or military airlift service, and to airports designated by the United States Customs Service as airports of entry. Some of these identifiers are assigned to certain aviation weather reporting stations.

Most one-digit, two-letter identifiers have been assigned to aviation weather reporting and observation stations and special-use locations. Some of these identifiers may be assigned to public-use landing facilities within the United States and its jurisdictions, which do not meet the requirements for identifiers in the three-letter series. In this identifier series, the digit is always in the first position of the three-character combination.

Most one-letter, two-digit identifiers are assigned to public-use landing facilities within the United States and its jurisdictions, which do not meet the requirements for identifiers in the three-letter series. Some of these identifiers are also assigned to aviation weather reporting stations.

- One-letter, two-digit identifiers are keyed by the alphabetical letter. The letter may appear in the first, middle or last position in the combination of three characters. When the letter signifies an air traffic control center's area, the assignment will not change if the center's boundaries are realigned.
- Identifiers in this series which could conflict with the Victor, Jet or colored airway numbers are not assigned.

Two-letter, two-digit identifiers are assigned to private-use landing facilities in the United States and its jurisdictions which do not meet the requirements for three-character assignments. They are keyed by the two-letter Post Office or supplemental abbreviation of the state with which they are associated. The two-letter code appears in the first two, middle, or last two positions of the four-character code.

The use of the FAA identifier system in meteorology ended in 1996 when airways reporting code was replaced by METAR code. The METAR code is dependent wholly on the ICAO identifier system.

=== History ===
As of September 1947, the CAA had compiled an internal list of identifiers. The list was made publicly available in 1963.

== National Civil Aviation Agency of Brazil ==
Since January 2019, the National Civil Aviation Agency of Brazil (ANAC) issues a six-digit designator called Aerodrome Identification Code (Portuguese: Código de Identificação de Aeródromo, CIAD) for each aerodrome. The first two digits are the letters related to the State of the Federation where the aerodrome is located and the next four digits are numbers assigned by ANAC. In the case of military aerodromes, the first number is 9.

== Transport Canada identifier ==
Transport Canada assigns two-, three-, and four-character identifiers, including three-letter identifiers beginning with letters Y and Z, for its areas of jurisdiction. These identifiers are designed to mesh with the FAA Identifier system described above, though a few conflicts exist.

== Federal Civil Aviation Agency of Mexico ==
The Federal Civil Aviation Agency of Mexico (Agencia Federal de Aviación Civil, AFAC) is a designator of airfield codes, each consisting of three letters, used to identify each civil airfield in Mexico. (These characters are chosen with the same methodology as for IATA codes, i.e. taking three letters of the airfield name, for example ZPU for Zacapu Airstrip.) These airfields can be airports, private airstrips, land heliports, boat heliports, and platform helipads. For more substantial airports the IATA designators are used, for example TLC for Toluca International Airport, although there are some exceptions, such IATA XAL and AFAC ALA for Alamos National Airport, Sonora.

== Russian location identifier ==
Within Russia (and before 1991 within the Soviet Union), there are airport identifiers (внутренний код - internal code) having three Cyrillic letters. They are used for e.g. ticket sales. Some small airports with scheduled flights have no IATA code, only this code and perhaps an ICAO code. Unlike the IATA codes, they changed when renaming some cities of the former USSR in the 1990s, e.g. Saint Petersburg (formerly Leningrad), which was ЛЕД and became СПТ. As of 2009, about 3,000 code combinations of internal code are in use. List of three-letter internal cyrillic codes used in Russia can be found in the list of airports in Russia.

Many smaller aerodromes in Russia do not have an ICAO code. Instead, they are assigned an entry in the State and Experimental Aviation Point Location Index, or perhaps two: one civilian, normally beginning with Cyrillic "У" (=Latin "U"), the other for "state" or military operations, almost always the same except that the first character is now a Cyrillic "Ь" (=Latin "X"). These codes are given in the official document which has separate columns for national codes (civilian), national codes (military & state), and some also have "international" codes; only the latter correspond to ICAO codes. For example, Magadan Sokol Airport is listed with the national civilian code УХММ, the national military code ЬХММ, and the "international" UHMM.

== WMO station identifiers ==
The World Meteorological Organization used a system of five-digit numeric station codes to represent synoptic weather stations. An example is 72295 for Los Angeles International Airport (LAX).

- The first digit specifies the region: 0 to 1 for Europe, 2 to 3 for Russia, 4 for Asia, 5 for the Far East, 6 for Africa, 7 for North America, 8 for South America and Antarctica, and 9 for the Pacific.
- The remainder of the digits are set at the regional and national level.

A modernization of WMO station identifiers was performed as part of the WMO Integrated Global Observing System (WIGOS).

- Previously, observing stations were registered using WMO Identifiers, which had the form of five-digit numbers for synoptic and climate stations. Many countries ran out of numbers within their allowable ranges and were unable to register additional stations.
- The new WIGOS Station Identifiers (WSI) were created with a structure of four blocks, using digits and alphanumeric characters that allow essentially an unlimited number of stations to be registered.
- The four parts of WSI are identifier series, issuer, issue number, and identifier. Existing WMO identifiers were migrated to the WSI format, e.g. "0-20000-0-72295" for LAX. "20000" is the issuer code for WMO itself, and countries use their three-digit ISO code as issuer code

A presentation at the WMO site explains:

- A critical component: WIGOS Station Identifiers Basic concept of the WIGOS Station Identifiers (WSIs):
  - Many countries have run out of numbers within their allowable ranges and are thus not able to register additional stations
  - Created to allow essentially an unlimited number of stations to be registered in WIGOS
  - Its implementation by Members is mandatory, as part of the WIGOS Technical Regulations, including the WIGOS Metadata Standard
  - WSIs should not have meaning in themselves: Users should not look for metadata in the patterns of a WSI, they should go to OSCAR/Surface for the metadata of the station associated with that WSI
- Assigning of WSIs (A)
  - For "new stations" (those that started to operate or became affiliated with a WMO Program after 1 July 2016) to develop and document their WSI national schemas, meaning:
    - using the three-digit ISO Country code in the Issuer of Identifier (second block)
    - and defining the national rules for distributing the numbers in the third and fourth blocks (Issue Number and Local Identifier) for the stations in their territory
  - For stations registered in WMO No. 9 Volume A prior to July 2016:
    - They have been migrated into OSCAR/Surface with their traditional five-digit WMO identifiers being automatically converted into WSI:
    - range 20000–20010 in the second block, "0" in the third block and the traditional WMO ID in the fourth block.

== United States weather agency identifiers ==
The National Weather Service uses several schemes for identifying stations. It typically relies on the ICAO and WMO identifiers, although several weather forecast offices (WFOs) and weather radar sites that have moved away from airports have been given their own codes which do not conflict with existing codes. These typically end in X, such as where Birmingham, Alabama (BHM) had its radar site replaced by one south of the city (BMX), or where the Knoxville (TYS) office was moved to nearby Morristown, Tennessee (MRX). Others have changed such that Miami, Florida is now MFL instead of MIA, and Dallas/Fort Worth (formerly DFW) is now FWD. Climatological applications use the WBAN (Weather Bureau Army Navy) system, which is a five-digit numeric code for identifying weather stations under its jurisdiction.

Recently it began using four-letter-plus-one-digit identifiers for specialized weather requirements such as hydrometeorological stations. These are used by the USFS RAWS system, and by the stream gauges operated by the USGS, both of which report through GOES weather satellites operated by NOAA. These use three letters which are a mnemonic for the location, followed by the first letter of the U.S. state, followed by a numeral indicating the alphabetical order within that letter (for example, North Carolina stations end with N7). The mnemonic may be the nearest town, or the name of the stream, or a combination of the two; and the same names may be rearranged into different mnemonics for different nearby locations. For example, VING1 is the gauge at Vinings, Georgia, and is differentiated from other stations along the Chattahoochee River (such as CHAG1 in nearby Oakdale) which are also at the Atlanta city limit like Vinings is, and from other streams in Atlanta such as Peachtree Creek (AANG1).

The United States Air Force Weather Agency (AFWA), acting on behalf of all the American military services, assigns special use ICAO identifiers beginning with "KQ", for use by deployed units supporting real-world contingencies; deployed/in-garrison units providing support during exercises; classified operating locations; and units that have requested, but not yet received a permanent location identifier.

One system still used by both the Air Force and National Climatic Data Center is the Master Station Catalog or MASLIB code. This is a 6-digit numeric code that is essentially the same scheme as the WMO station identifier but adds an extra digit, allowing many more stations to be indexed. This extra digit is always "0" when referencing an actual WMO station using the five-digit identifier, but may be 1..9 to reference other stations that exist in the vicinity. The MASLIB identifiers are not generally recognized outside the United States.

== Transplanted identifiers ==
There have been rare instances where identifiers have been transplanted to new locations, mainly due to the closure of the original airport. Prominent examples are DEN/KDEN, which migrated from Stapleton International Airport to Denver International Airport in 1996, and AUS/KAUS, which migrated from Austin Mueller Municipal Airport to Austin–Bergstrom International Airport in 1999. Both of these cases occurred because the original locations were closed.

Occasionally a code will be discontinued entirely, with no successor. Sometimes this is a small airport that has closed, such as Stone Mountain Airport, whose identifier 00A is now used for an R/C heliport in Bensalem, Pennsylvania. In another case, the identifiers for Idlewild Airport in New York were changed to JFK and KJFK when it was renamed after John F. Kennedy, and its original IDL and KIDL were later reused for Indianola Municipal Airport in Indianola, Mississippi.

Transplanted identifiers tend to be poorly documented, and can cause problems in data systems and software which process historical records and in research and legal work. A similar problem also exists for broadcast callsigns.

== See also ==
- UN/LOCODE: locations used in trade and transport with functions such as seaports, rail and road terminals, airports, Postal Exchange Office and border crossing points
