= Johnson Ferry =

19th-century ferry across Chattahoochee River, Georgia, USA

Coordinates: 33.9437°N 84.4052°W

Johnson Ferry was an important 19th-century ferry linking what is now Atlanta with much of north Georgia on the other side of the Chattahoochee River. The name Johnson is a corrupted version of the owner's name, which was really Johnston; therefore the ferry was originally called the Johnston ferry (or Johnston's ferry). A historical plaque on the present Johnson Ferry Road documents that ownership.

William Marion Johnston, a Georgia native born in 1817, owned the farm at that location during the Civil War and raised thirteen children by two different wives. When he died in 1879, his grave in Marietta was robbed by a janitor from the Atlanta Medical College in order to sell the cadaver to the college.

== Johnson Ferry Road ==
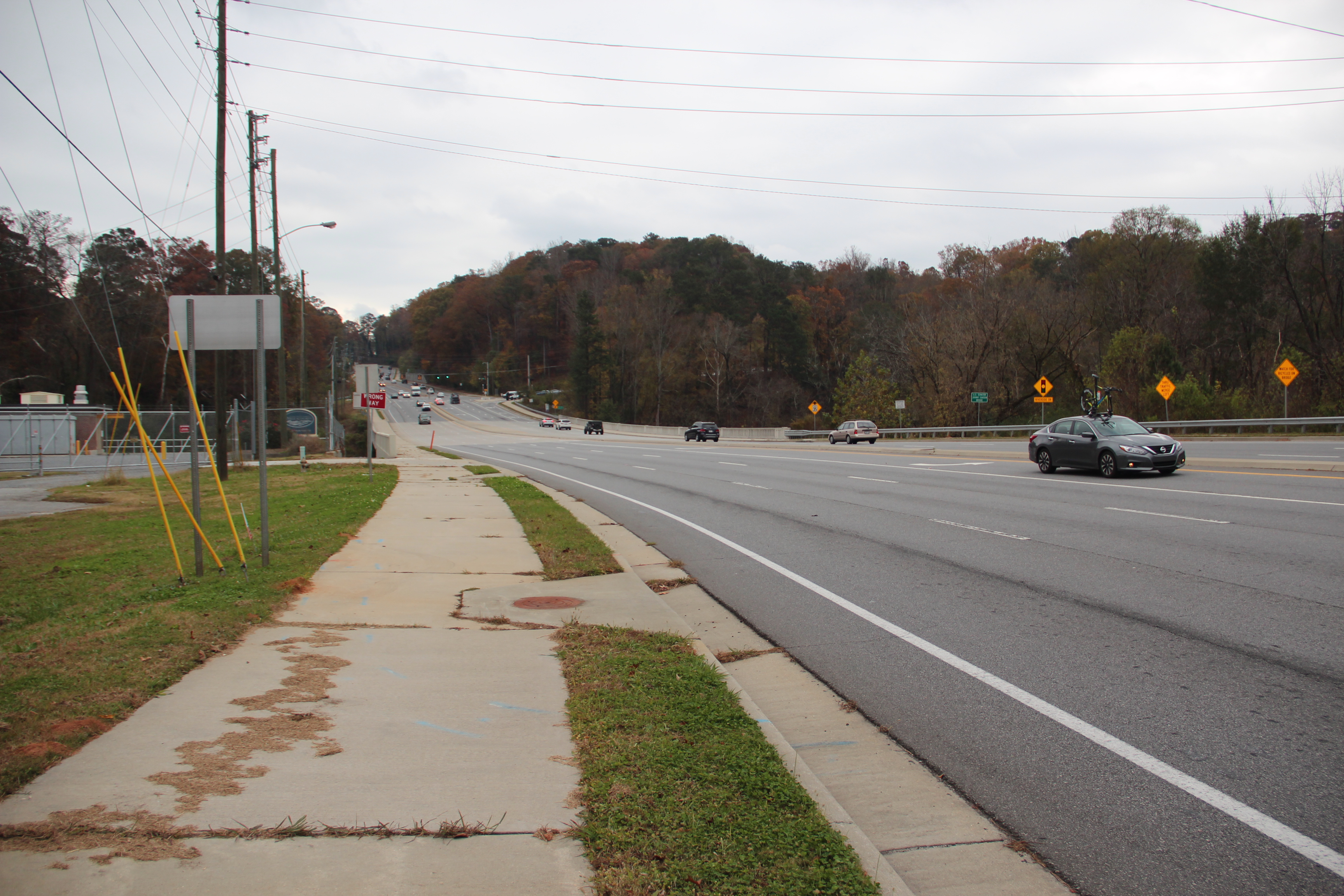
Johnson Ferry Road in 2017

Johnson Ferry Road — often incorrectly referred to as "Johnson's Ferry Road," as most other local historic ferry names end in -s or -'s — is now a major arterial road between Cobb County and Sandy Springs. It begins in Chamblee at Georgia 141 and travels northwest, and temporarily terminates in Sandy Springs south of I-285 at an intersection with Glenridge Drive. Then it returns just north of I-285, also at Glenridge Drive, crossing north/south Roswell Road (Georgia 9 from Atlanta) (Hammond being the original name of Sandy Springs) near its central business district. It becomes four lanes at Abernathy Road, although traffic to and from the northwest generally takes Abernathy rather than the southern leg of Johnson Ferry Road. It continues northwest with various turn lanes and descends to Riverside Drive, then crosses the river, leaving the city of Sandy Springs and crossing the county line from Fulton into Cobb County.

The scenery changes from tree-lined and park-like to cut-away hillsides covered with invasive kudzu vines and naturalized mimosa trees. This is the result of the 1990s widening to six lanes plus a raised median, with no replanting done except in the median. Upon reaching Paper Mill Road, the steep climb levels off and heavier local traffic begins, passing Lower Roswell Road at Parkaire and then Roswell Road (Georgia 120 from Marietta), the major crossroads of east Cobb, and one of the county's most-traveled and most accident-prone intersections. It is also a major retail business district known as Merchants Walk, for its original shopping center. North of here, it becomes residential and goes back to four lanes and a landscaped median, passing Sewell Mill Road, Post Oak Tritt Road, and then coming to Shallowford Road (not the same as another Shallowford Road in Atlanta), which is an east-west arterial road (connecting with Sandy Plains Road and the city of Roswell). This intersection is a retail business district known as Shallowford Falls. The road continues north as a neighborhood street in the Chimney Lakes neighborhood (the location of the actual "Shallowford Falls"), finally ending at Childers Road.

== Bridge widening ==
The Johnson Ferry bridge was widened from four to six lanes in 2013.

From Columns Drive on the northwest riverbank of the Chattahoochee River, southeast to Abernathy Road, and continuing east on Abernathy to Roswell Road (SR 9), the roads have been temporarily designated by GDOT as State Route 947. This is due to the heavy volume of rush hour traffic traveling this route to get to and from SR 400 and Perimeter Mall, and the failure of Cobb and Fulton counties to come to an agreement on their own, with Fulton at one time timing the traffic lights to cause further morning backups into Cobb.

All but one of the homes along Abernathy were destroyed for widening, but the neighborhoods along the 1¼ miles or two kilometers of Johnson Ferry Road were spared. Johnson Ferry and Abernathy were "broken", such that they flow directly into each other, and now require a turn at two new intersections to stay straight on the original roads. The bridge at the former ferry location was widened between Columns Drive on the Cobb riverbank to Riverside Drive on the Fulton riverbank, from four lanes to six plus bike lanes, wide sidewalks, and a raised road median.

The adjacent section of the Chattahoochee River National Recreation Area is the Johnson Ferry unit. It runs along the Cobb side of the river, most of it northeast almost to Morgan Falls Dam, and a small section southwest along Columns Drive.

== See also ==
- Historic ferries of the Atlanta area
