= Atlanta Regional Commission =

Planning agency for metro Atlanta

- Abbreviation: ARC
- Formation: 1971; 55 years ago
- Founder: Georgia State Assembly
- Merger of: Atlanta Regional Metropolitan Planning Commission; Metropolitan Atlanta Council for Health; Atlanta Area Transportation Study
- Type: Metropolitan planning organization
- Headquarters: Atlanta, United States
- Coordinates: 33.76021678934752°N 84.38664140682828°W
- Region served: Metro Atlanta
- Members: 11 counties, 75 municipalities (2024)
- Board Chairman: Andre Dickens
- Executive Director and CEO: Anna Roach
- Affiliations: MARTA
- Revenue: $90.4 million (2023)
- Expenses: $85.1 million (2023)
- Website: atlantaregional.org

The Atlanta Regional Commission (ARC) is the regional planning and intergovernmental coordination agency for the metro Atlanta, Georgia, United States, spanning the 11-county area of Cherokee, Clayton, Cobb, DeKalb, Douglas, Fayette, Forsyth, Fulton, Gwinnett, Henry and Rockdale counties. As of July 2024, ARC's jurisdiction represented 5.2 million people. ARC also serves as the metropolitan planning organization for those and nine more counties in the region: Barrow, Bartow, Carroll, Coweta, Hall, Newton, Paulding, Spalding, and Walton counties. The ARC is one of 12 regional commissions throughout Georgia. The ARC is funded through a number of sources: local, state and federal government entities and private funds. ARC oversees metro Atlanta's water and transportation planning.

== History ==
ARC's earliest predecessor, the Atlanta Metropolitan Planning Commission was founded in 1947 by Dekalb and Fulton counties, and the city of Atlanta, which spans both counties. In 1960, the commission expanded as the Atlanta Regional Metropolitan Planning Commission, to represent the five-county Atlanta region. In 1971, the Georgia General Assembly created the Atlanta Regional Commission, by vesting and consolidating its immediate predecessor's functions, along with the functions of other regional bodies such as the Metropolitan Atlanta Council for Health, Atlanta Area Transportation Study in ARC. Since then, ARC's jurisdiction has grown to its current size of 11 counties and 75 municipalities.

In February 2020, ARC approved $173 billion over the next 30 years on traffic and public transit projects in its jurisdiction, including highway expansions, new transit lines, and bus rapid transit lines. In August 2024, ARC approved $265 million in transportation projects.

== Membership ==
The Board membership of the commission includes:

1. Each county commission chairman in the 11-county region;
2. One mayor from each county (except Fulton County);
3. One mayor from the northern half of Fulton County and one mayor from the southern half of Fulton County;
4. The mayor of the City of Atlanta;
5. One member of the Atlanta City Council;
6. Fifteen private citizens, one from each of the 15 multi-jurisdictional districts of roughly equal population, elected by the 23 public officials; and
7. One member appointed by the Board of the Georgia Department of Community Affairs.

== Agency structure and functions ==
The ARC is divided into numerous department covering a broad range of issues, from the region's growing senior population to region-wide transit issues to geographic information system data. The agency's structure and functions can be outlined as follows:

- Center for Community Services: Aging & Health Resources Division, Homeland Security & Recovery Division, and Workforce Solutions Division
- Center for Livable Communities: Community Development Division, Mobility Services Division, Natural Resources Division, Research & Analytics Division, and Transportation Access & Mobility Division
- Center for Strategic Relations: Communications & Marketing Division, Community Engagement Division, and Governmental Affairs Division
- Office of the Executive Director and Support services: Financial Services Division, General Services Division, Information Technology Division, Strategic Initiatives Division, Talent Management Division, and Secretary to the Board

== Awards ==
Each fall, the ARC gives awards for noteworthy new projects. The categories are:

- Development of Excellence, which usually goes to large projects like a redone town square
- Exceptional Merit for Context Sensitive Neighborhood Infill Design
- Exceptional Merit for Historic Preservation
- Exceptional Merit for Infill Redevelopment
- Livable Centers Initiative Achievement Award

== Criticisms ==
In 2018, a Georgia state audit found a pattern of poor financial recordkeeping, questionable spending practices, and misuse of purchasing cards at ARC, including misuse by Doug Hooker, the commission's executive director.
