= List of sundown towns in the United States =

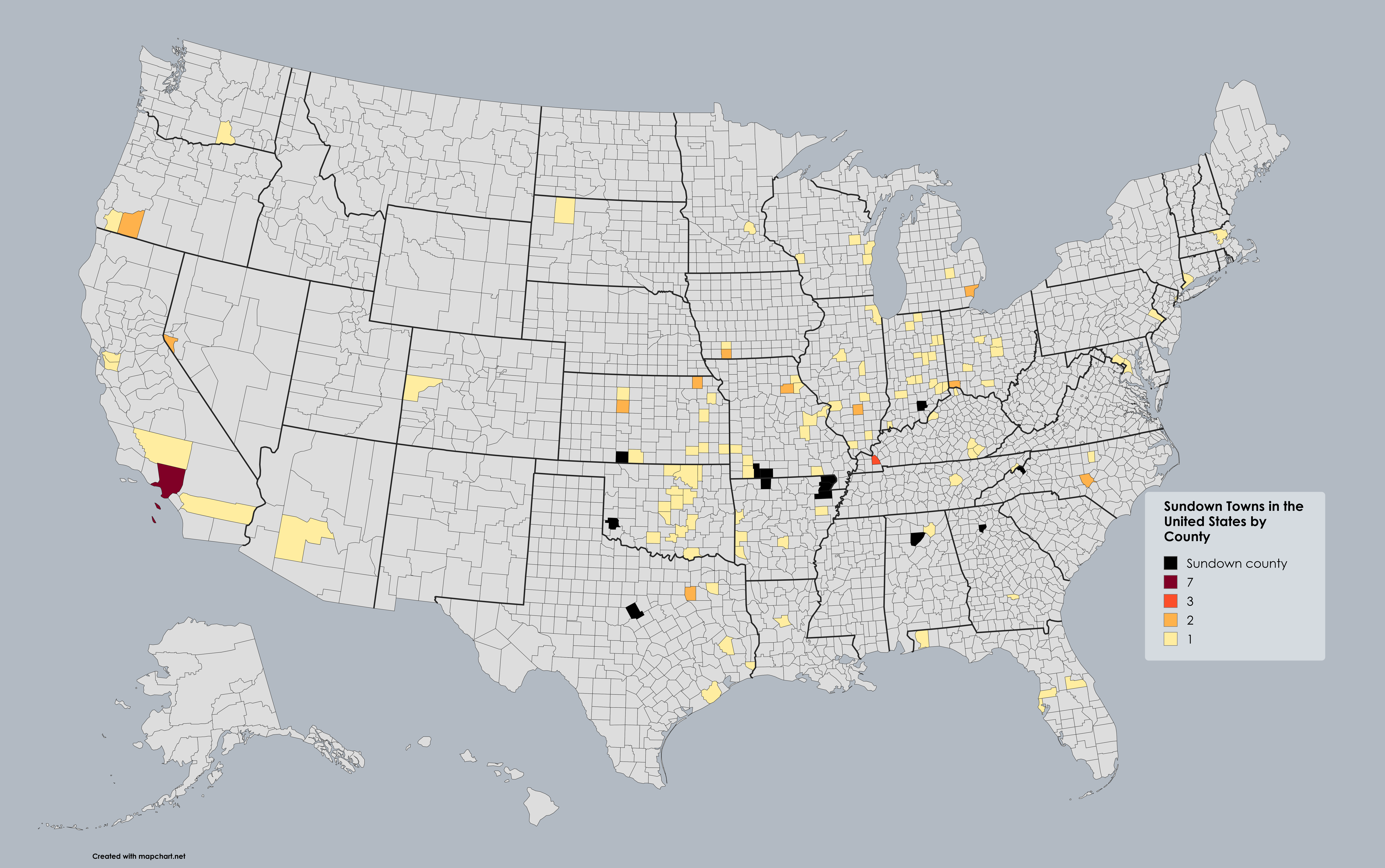
Map showing historical sundown towns in the United States by county. Map only includes places with verifiable instances of discrimination based on race listed in this article. A location's inclusion here is not necessarily indicative of this type of discrimination being present today.

A sundown town is a municipality or neighborhood within the United States that practices or once practiced a form of racial segregation characterized by intimidation, hostility, or violence among White people directed toward non-Whites, especially against African Americans. The term "sundown town" derives from the practice of White towns then erecting signage alerting non-Whites to vacate the area before sundown. Sundown towns might include entire sundown counties or sundown suburbs and have historically been strengthened by the local presence of the Ku Klux Klan (KKK), a White supremacist organization. Discrimination practices commonly found in sundown towns became federally illegal during the 20th century.

Although the United States has a history of expulsion of African Americans from certain communities dating to the 18th century, sundown towns became common during the nadir of American race relations after the Reconstruction era ended in 1877 and through the civil rights movement in the mid-twentieth century. The period was marked by the lawful continuation of racial segregation in the United States via Jim Crow laws. The Civil Rights Act of 1968 codified enforcement of federal law abolishing restrictive housing covenants.

Sundown towns could issue written warnings to non-Whites by way of signage, city ordinances, housing covenants, and notices posted in local papers or directly on the homes of non-White families and their employers. Violent means of expelling minorities from their communities may include the realization or threat of firing gunshots and dynamite into their homes, burning down their homes, placing bombs and performing cross burnings in their yards, mobbing them, lynching them, and massacring them.

== Definition and scope ==
A sundown town is an all-White community that shows or has shown hostility toward non-Whites. Sundown town practices may be evoked in the form of city ordinances barring people of color after dark, exclusionary covenants for housing opportunity, signage warning ethnic groups to vacate, unequal treatment by local law enforcement, and unwritten rules permitting harassment. Sundown towns in the United States include present communities that do not "socially accept" people who are not White. Although African Americans are primarily the focus of sundown town claims, Chinese Americans, Jewish Americans, Native Americans, and Mexican Americans have also been subject to this discriminatory practice.

Legally, municipalities cannot currently enforce restrictions or discrimination against people by race or other protected classes, but this has not always been the case. The 1948 United States Supreme Court case Shelley v. Kraemer outlawed the legal enforcement of restrictive housing covenants. Although the Civil Rights Act of 1866 prohibited housing discrimination and defined equal protection, enforcement of such provisions would not be codified until the Civil Rights Act of 1968. As such, any location that is listed below is not an indicator of that place practicing traditional sundown town rules today.

== Sundown communities by state ==
=== Alabama ===
- Arab, Alabama, historically had signage warning Black people to leave the town before dark and did not permit Black persons during the daytime either.
- Cullman County, Alabama, did not allow Black people by law from the 1890s to the 1950s. Notices were posted on roads leading out of the county that read, "Nigger, read and run, don't let the sun go down on you in Cullman County." According to former Speaker of the Alabama House of Representatives Tom Drake, "there used to be signs on the railroad track, at the county line and all that. 'Nigger, don't let the sun set on your head in Cullman County.'"

=== Arizona ===
- Bisbee, Arizona, a mining town that strictly enforced racial segregation, completely banned Chinese residents and forced Mexican workers into lower-paying jobs. This atmosphere of intense hostility turned violent in July 1919 when local police and armed white residents attacked Black soldiers who were visiting town for a holiday parade.
- Duncan, Arizona, operated as a sundown town, utilizing formal ordinances, signage, and the threat of violence to enforce racial exclusion. Records from 1949 specifically highlight the town's history of using violent expulsion and official actions to prevent Black residents from living in the community.
- Kingman, Arizona, is a town where residents describe a long-standing culture of anti-Black hostility, including reports of a sign at the city limits that warned Black people to leave before sunset. This environment of racial intolerance persisted for decades, evidenced by the town's extremely low Black population and ongoing reports of racist language and hate symbols among students in the late 2000s.
- Prescott, Arizona, maintained a hostile environment for Black people, which included the use of explicit, violent warnings at city limits telling them not to let the sun set on them there. Beyond these threats, the town’s long-standing reputation as an exclusively "white man’s town" was upheld through systemic social and housing practices that discouraged Black residency well into the 20th century.
- Scottsdale, Arizona, was the spring training camp for the Boston Red Sox. When Pumpsie Green joined the team in 1959, he was not housed in the hotel with the rest of the team. The Red Sox claimed the hotel was full; however, historical accounts note that Black people could not live in Scottsdale after dark, requiring Green to reside in Phoenix.
- Tempe, Arizona, home to Arizona State University, was considered a sundown town from its founding in 1871 for 90 years. Tempe allowed Black people to work but not reside in the town. Warren and Carol Livingston became the first Black people to buy property in Tempe in 1965.
- Youngtown, Arizona, was known for excluding Black, Hispanic, and Indigenous people through violence, threats, and the use of police action.

=== Arkansas ===
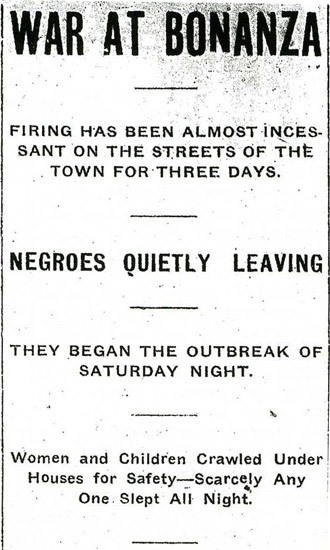
May 2, 1904, newspaper article describing a race war in Bonanza, Arkansas

- Bonanza, Arkansas, forcibly expelled "nearly all" Black residents between April 27 and May 7, 1904, by inducing terror through "as many as 500 [gun]shots" into the homes of Black residents.
- Boone County, Arkansas, is a county containing Harrison (see below) and Zinc, home of Knights of the Ku Klux Klan leader Thomas Robb.
- Clay County, Arkansas, forbade Black people as late as 1945.
- Craighead County, Arkansas, forbade Black people as late as 1945.
- Greene County, Arkansas, forbade Black people as late as 1945.
- Harrison, Arkansas, was the site of two race riots in 1905 and 1909. In 1905, a White mob broke into the local jail to kidnap two Black prisoners, drive them outside the city, and whip them while threatening them to leave. In 1909, Charles Stinnett, a Black man, was sentenced to hang for the alleged rape of a White woman, and Harrison's White community expelled more Black people in its aftermath. Stinnett died from strangulation as a result of a botched hanging fifteen minutes after it began.
- Hickory Ridge, Arkansas, segregated Black housing to a "slum" west of the Cotton Belt Railroad. In 1910, as a response to a rape allegation, residents expelled Black people by throwing dynamite into their houses.
- Horatio, Arkansas, residents posted notices on the front doors of 17 Mexicans employed at a fruit company to leave town or face violent consequences on or about April 12, 1905. The community had been excluding Black people from living there for years before.
- Marked Tree, Arkansas, was reported by The Commercial Appeal in 1896 in an article stating that around eight years prior, the town had been a place where "no negroes were allowed to live in Marked Tree, and a delegation of citizens was organized to drive them out."
- Mena, Arkansas, wrote in a newspaper about how it had "No Negroes".
- Sheridan, Arkansas, forcibly expelled "nearly all" Black residents between April 27 and May 7, 1904.
- Springdale, Arkansas, had signs at the city limit stating Blacks needed to leave by sunset. Reports of when these were last seen vary from as early as the 1950s to as late as 1976.

=== California ===
- Antioch, California, residents burned Chinatown and banned Chinese people after sunset when one doctor's report on April 29, 1876, pointed to Chinese sex workers for spreading venereal disease.
- Beverly Hills, California, was planned as an "all-White suburb" along with Culver City, Palos Verdes Estates, Tarzana, and others.
- Burbank, California, barred members of the Civilian Conservation Corps from locating a Black-owned business in Griffith Park in the 1930s on the grounds of an "old ordinance of the cities of Burbank and Glendale which prohibited Negroes from remaining inside municipal limits after sun down."
- Culver City, California, was planned as an "all-White suburb" along with Beverly Hills, Palos Verdes Estates, Tarzana, and others. Gone With the Wind producer David Selznick was concerned by the pushback from African Americans alleging racism in the movie's screenplay, after it was filmed in Culver City during its time as a sundown town. Deed restrictions exist today that disallow the ownership, transfer to, or leasing of any property to people of color, but these restrictions remain unenforceable and are obsolete.
- El Segundo, California, along with neighboring Manhattan Beach and Hawthorne, existed as a sundown town. The city allowed real estate covenants to restrict the ownership of property to white people exclusively, and disallowed the presence of people of color after dark. This trend continued well into the 1960s, even after laws were revised to allow Black community participation. By 1970, census data shows that the African American population in El Segundo grew from less than 1% to only 3%.
- Glendale, California, was a sundown town at least until the 1960s. In 2020, Glendale's city council passed a resolution that formally apologized for its past sundown town status.
- Hawthorne, California, had a sign during the 1930s that read, "Nigger, Don't Let the Sun Set on You in Hawthorne." Hawthorne's former status as a sundown town was mentioned by the Los Angeles Times in 2007.
- Hemet, California, was once a sundown town where Black visitors were allowed to work during the day but were not allowed to stay the night.
- Manhattan Beach, California, was influenced by the Ku Klux Klan in the 1920s to condemn Black-owned businesses and restrict Black home ownership, as well as their use of the beach. Bruce's Beach was a popular African-American beach resort in the town from 1912 to 1924 when the city used eminent domain to close it. In 2021, the Los Angeles County Board of Supervisors voted unanimously to approve returning the county land to the heirs of Charles and Willa Bruce. The complex process of transferring the parcels to their great-grandsons was completed in 2022. In January 2023 the Bruce family announced their decision to sell the beach back to the county for $20 million.
- Palos Verdes Estates, California, was planned as an "all-White suburb" along with Beverly Hills, Culver City, Tarzana, and others. The Commonwealth Trust Company filed the Palos Verdes Protective Restrictions in Los Angeles County in 1923. These restrictions established rules for the developer and all land owners, including the limitation of all non-white people to occupy or use property. Palos Verdes specifically excluded Mexican-Americans from living in the estates, yet Mexican-inspired architecture was mandated in most of the area.
- Piedmont, California, had its first Black homeowners, Sidney and Irene Dearing, in 1925 after they bypassed the city's restrictive covenants for housing by using a White family member to purchase their home. The Dearings faced the threat of a 500-person mob who planted bombs on the property when the Dearings refused to leave, and when the chief of police, a Ku Klux Klan member named Burton Becker, chose not to protect the family, they were forced to sell the home back to the city.
- San Leandro, California, used racial covenants during a post-World War II development boom to prevent those not of White ancestry, especially African Americans, to own property or live in the city. In the 1960s and 1970s, it was nicknamed "the whitest city west of the Mississippi" for its nearly all-White population (partially of Southern/Okie background, who brought their racial attitudes with them) and continued racial restrictions on who could reside. Ku Klux Klan activity was publicly prominent until the late 1980s.
- Taft, California, posted "No Colored Allowed" signs that were removed prior to 1975.
- Tarzana, Los Angeles, California, was planned as an "all-White suburb" along with Beverly Hills, Culver City, Palos Verdes Estates, and others.

=== Colorado ===
- Fruita, Colorado, had a law stating that all Black people had to leave the city limits before dusk; the law was repealed in 1952.
- Loveland, Colorado, has a history of racism and once greeted travelers with signs that read "We observe the Jim Crow laws here" displayed beneath "Welcome to Loveland" signs.

=== Connecticut ===
- Darien, Connecticut, has a history of exclusivity and racism, including a local Ku Klux Klan presence. It once had, as of 1953, a "so-called gentlemen's agreement, where real estate agents would not sell homes to Black or Jewish families." The 1947 film Gentleman's Agreement is themed around antisemitism in New York City; New Canaan, Connecticut; and Darien, and was partly filmed on location in Darien. Since the mid-20th century, Darien has become a more welcoming community, as reported in a Connecticut Public Radio story about a Jewish same-sex couple.

=== Florida ===
- Gulfport, Florida, had an informal policy that barred Black people from staying in the town after sundown that lasted until the 1950s.
- Jay, Florida, once had signs aimed at Black people that warned, "don't let the sun set on you in Jay." Jay went from having 175 Black residents in the 1920 census to 0 Black residents in the 1930 census after a race riot that resulted from a dispute between a White man and a Black man over farm equipment. Jay's history is portrayed in the 2024 documentary Welcome to Jay.
- Ocoee, Florida, was the site of a 1920 massacre that nearly eliminated its Black population. The city issued a formal proclamation in 2018 that it was no longer a sundown town.
- Zephyrhills, Florida, for a time did not allow Black people in its city limits.

=== Georgia ===
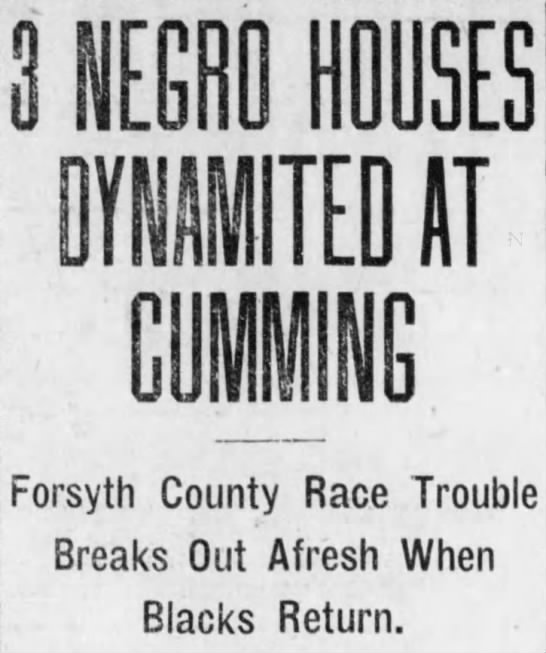
A headline taken from the February 19, 1913, edition of The Atlanta Georgian about violence in Cumming, Georgia

- Cumming, Georgia, once had bands of mounted men dubbed "Night Riders", an organization that spread beyond Cumming that had the ambition "to drive every negro out of North Georgia counties", in the months following the 1912 racial conflict in Forsyth County, Georgia. The Night Riders left notices on Black homes at night warning them to vacate, which was "sufficient to cause an exodus of the negroes." By December 1912, Night Riders had begun posting notices on the homes of White farmers who employed Black farmhands, threatening that their barns and homes would be burned if they did not cease to protect their Black workers.
- Fitzgerald, Georgia, was a sundown town by 1900. Its founders, some of whom were former Union army soldiers during the American Civil War, had reportedly "met and solved the race problem by keeping the races separate and drawing, not only the color line, but the land line on the negro."
- Forsyth County, Georgia, drove out its Black population during a period of racial conflict in September 1912 that began in the Cumming area. In 1987, a group of White residents gathered at an intersection to protest a civil rights march called the "Walk for Brotherhood". According to The New York Times, "the march was originally planned by a Forsyth County resident, Charles A. Blackburn, who said he had hoped to dispel the racist image of the county, which has no blacks among its population of about 38,500."

=== Illinois ===
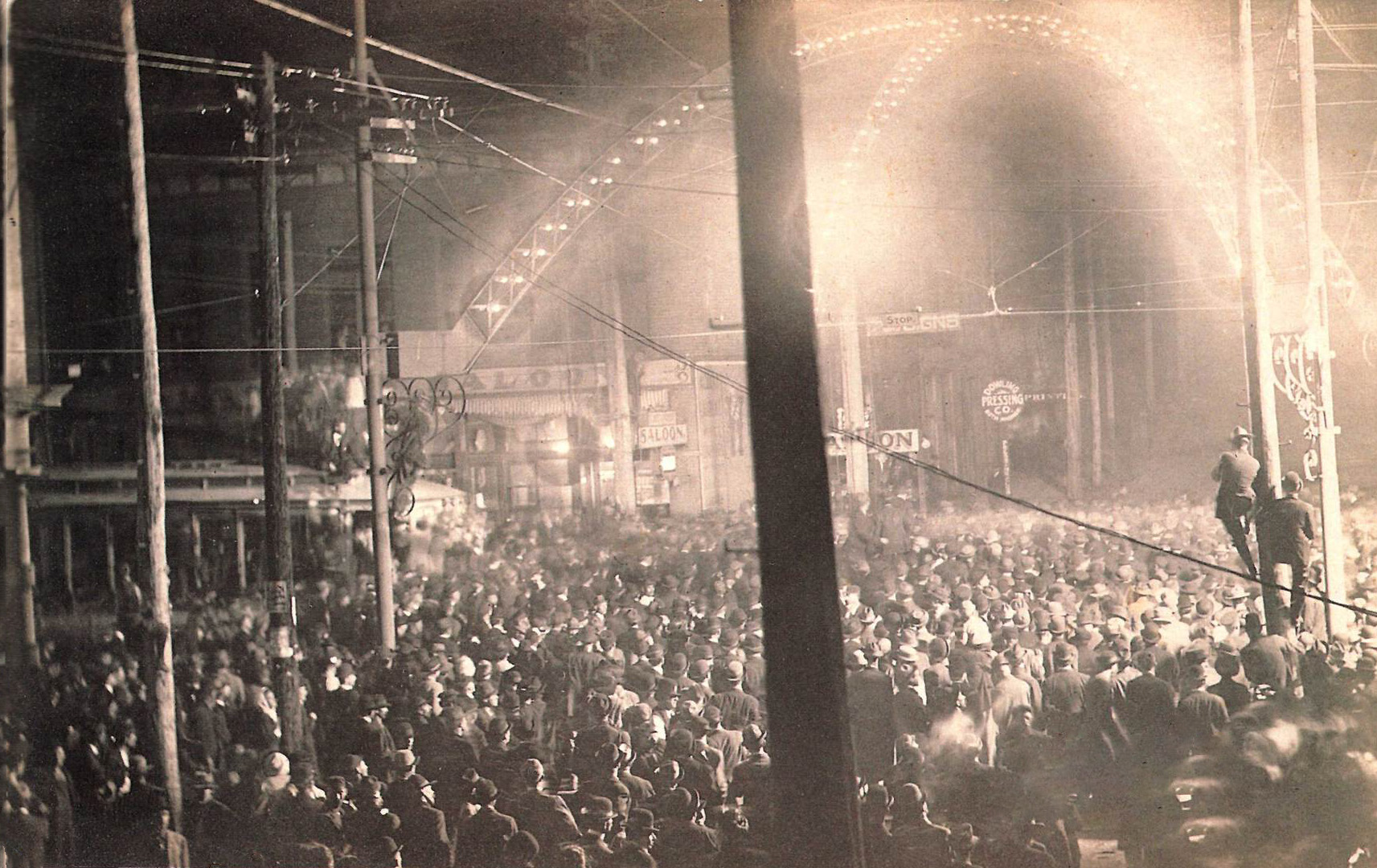
Around 10,000 spectators watching the lynching of William "Froggie" James in Cairo, Illinois, on November 11, 1909

- Anna, Illinois, drove out its Black population in response to the 1909 lynching of William "Froggie" James in Cairo, Illinois, for the alleged rape and murder of Anna Pelley. The city's name was colloquially used as an acronym for "Ain't No Niggers Allowed", despite its namesake being Anna Davie, the town founder's wife. Signs warning Black people to leave before sunset were posted on Illinois Route 127 in the Anna and Jonesboro areas as late as the 1970s.
- Cicero, Illinois, was the site of a 1951 race riot that took place when a mob of thousands of Whites violently protested a Black bus driver's family moving into the all-White suburb. Cicero allowed Black people to work in the city but not live there as late as 1966.
- De Land, Illinois, board of trustees members acknowledged in 2002 that the municipality had passed a sundown ordinance for African Americans decades ago.
- Effingham, Illinois, had sundown signs that were removed by 1960 and prohibited Black people "beyond the railroad station and bus station" for sometime thereafter.
- Eldorado, Illinois, forced out its non-White residents with stone-throwing and gunfire into their homes during a 1902 race war, reportedly out of "fear that colored labor will be used in the mines which are being opened in that vicinity."
- Granite City, Illinois, had an unwritten sundown ordinance prior to 1967 according to former Mayor Donald Partney. Partney described Granite City as having "no racial problems" at the time when it reported a White population at 45,000 and a nonwhite population at 90. When Homer Randolph, then-chairman of the East St. Louis chapter of the Congress of Racial Equality, claimed that the city had a sundown ordinance, Partney stated, "When I became Mayor I went through our laws and found we do not have such an ordinance."
- Pekin, Illinois, was a sundown town unwelcoming for non-Whites. Prior to the American Civil War, Pekin had been a pro-slavery place. It once hosted rallies for the Ku Klux Klan, including one in August 1924 that attracted 25,000 to 45,000 attendees. Until 1981, Pekin Community High School’s football team was named the “Pekin Chinks”.
- Salem, Illinois, had signs warning Black people to leave before sunset.
- Sandoval, Illinois, as of 1898, would "not allow any negro to live in their town." When two Black carpenters arrived in the town to finish constructing a house in 1893, owing to a labor shortage, "a party of seventy-five waited upon them, threatening to lynch them if they did not move at once. Things were finally compromised, the men agreeing to leave town as soon as the building is finished."

=== Indiana ===
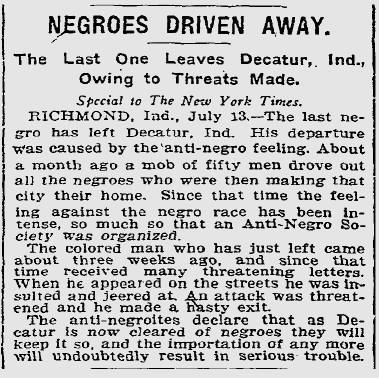
1902 New York Times article detailing the last Black man to be forcefully driven out of Decatur, Indiana

- Aurora, Indiana, once had a sign reading, "Nigger, Don't Let the Sun Set on You in Aurora", which was removed before 1937.
- Bluffton, Indiana, residents have claimed that the city "once had an ordinance to keep blacks out", according to former Mayor Ted Ellis in a 2006 statement. A Sikh restaurant owner and college professor was quoted in an archived newspaper clipping stating, "We don't wear turbans in Bluffton ... we speak English." Bluffton has since joined the National League of Cities' Partnership for Working Toward Inclusive Communities, and Ellis commented that "No matter how nice we are to one another, there still is an underlying current."
- Decatur, Indiana, drove its last Black residents away on July 13, 1902. A month prior to the incident, "a mob of fifty men drove out all the negroes who were then making that city their home." According to a contemporary New York Times article, "The colored man who has just left came about three weeks ago, and since that time received many threatening letters. When he appeared on the streets he was insulted and jeered at. An attack was threatened and he made a hasty exit." The article further states, "The anti-negroites declare that as Decatur is now cleared of negroes they will keep it so, and the importation of any more will undoubtedly result in serious trouble."
- Elwood, Indiana, in 1897 was a place where Black people were not "permitted to remain any length of time."
- Goshen, Indiana, adopted a resolution on March 17, 2015, acknowledging and apologizing for its exclusion practices and policies.
- Greensburg, Indiana, experienced race riots in 1906 and 1907. Sociologist James W. Loewen described the town as a sundown town in his 2005 book, Sundown Towns: A Hidden Dimension of American Racism.
- Greenwood, Indiana, had an unwritten law "forbidding Negroes to be in town after dark according to the Indiana Civil Rights Commission."
- Howell, Evansville, Indiana, was described by The Nashville American in 1904: "In Howell, a small station below here, negroes are not allowed to live, all strange negroes being driven out of the town by the marshal. The color line has been drawn tightly since the race riot of one year ago to-day, when several White people were killed."
- Linton, Indiana, expelled its Black population in 1896.
- Martinsville, Indiana, was reported by The Indianapolis Star in 2017 as "a town with a tragic reputation for racism, a place many blacks still consider a 'sundown town' where it's best not to be caught after dark."
- Muncie, Indiana, historically did not permit "strange negroes" in its Riverside and Normal City districts after dark. According to a 1904 article in The Plymouth Tribune, "the edict has gone out that unknown negroes who are found on the streets after nightfall are liable to be severely dealt with." Normal City expelled its Black population earlier that year.
- Osgood, Indiana, in 1894 was a place where "negroes were not allowed to live there, and that there was not a colored family within quite a number of miles of the town," according to the Indianapolis Journal.
- Salem, Indiana, was described by the Richmond Daily Palladium in 1898 as having "the unenviable distinction of being the only town in Indiana where negroes are not allowed to live."
- Valparaiso, Indiana, was described alongside Morgantown, Indiana, by the Chicago Review Press as one of two "sundown towns complete with billboards". These billboards are quoted to have said that people of color should leave by sundown. Valparaiso and Porter County reportedly had no Black residents until the 1960s. Barbara Frazier-Cotton, a single, Black mother of six children, moved to Valparaiso from Chicago in 1969 and recalled receiving "Keep Valparaiso Clean" business cards from the Ku Klux Klan and seeing crosses burned on her lawn. Frazier-Cotton recalled in 2003, "I don't know how to let anybody know how it feels to just to be paralyzed with fear to the point when the heater comes on, you just jump out of your skin." After becoming a friend to the community, Frazier-Cotton noted a change, stating, "Once the town knew I was not a bad person, they were OK."
- Washington County, Indiana, was mentioned in a 1903 article in The Richmond Item, which wrote that "negroes are not allowed to live in Washington county."

=== Iowa ===
- Lenox, Iowa, "was violently opposed to blacks. It was well-known," according to Taylor County Historical Society president Helen Janson, quoted in a 2006 article on racism in Iowa in The Des Moines Register.
- New Market, Iowa, once had a sundown ordinance, as confirmed by former New Market Mayor Frank Sefrit. This ordinance was recalled by John Baskerville, a Black professor at the University of Northern Iowa, as being in force until at least the mid-1980s, when a concert featuring Black musicians, including Baskerville, prompted the local government to suspend the order for a single night. Former city council members in office during the concert dispute that the ordinance was overturned and likened it to other laws "still on the books in small towns. People ignored it."

=== Kansas ===
- Altoona, Kansas, was a sundown town as of 1916.
- Baileyville, Kansas, was described along with Nortonville by The Evening Bulletin of Maysville, Kentucky, in 1902 as one of "two strong Republican towns in Kansas in which a negro is not allowed to live."
- Centralia, Kansas, forbade Black residents by 1901.
- Croweburg, Kansas, was a sundown town until 1912.
- Ellis, Kansas, had Jim Crow and sundown town laws for a time according to Nicodemus, Kansas, historian Angela Bates.
- Hays, Kansas, suffered from a feud in 1869 when three Black soldiers were accused of killing a railroad employee; all three died as a result of lynching in the outer city limits of Hays. Lyman D. Wooster Jr., a Hays resident during the 1920s and 1930s, brought up an "unwritten law" of Hays in the Hays Daily News in 2002, stating, "Namely Negroes—that was the politically correct term—were not to be in town after sundown."
- Howard, Kansas, as of 1901, was a sundown town where African Americans were not allowed to live.
- Independence, Kansas was known as a sundown town among residents at the time, where they prided themselves on "never having a Black person spend the night."
- Kiowa, Kansas, posted a sign at each of four roads into the city that read, "Niggers Read and Run", and Black residents were given 24 hours to leave town.
- Nortonville, Kansas, was described along with Baileyville by The Evening Bulletin of Maysville, Kentucky, in 1902 as one of "two strong Republican towns in Kansas in which a negro is not allowed to live."
- Scranton, Kansas, was described as a town where there was "not a single negro" in 1890 by the Daily State Chronicle.
- Stockton, Kansas, once kept a dugout for Black people traveling from other towns, such as Nicodemus, to abide by its sundown ordinance.

=== Kentucky ===
- Birmingham, Kentucky, before being submerged in a lake in the 1940s, drove out its Black population in 1908.
- Benton, Kentucky, drove out its Black population in 1908.
- Calvert City, Kentucky, was a sundown town in 1896, and signage was erected during the era reading, "Negro, don't let the sun go down on you here."
- Corbin, Kentucky, residents forced the town's Black population to leave town in late 1919, with one contemporary affidavit stating, "They swore at us and said: 'By God we are going to run all Negroes out of this town tonight." Other affidavits from the time of the incident wrote that a mob intentionally wanted to remove the Black population from Corbin and that Black workers who tried to return were threatened once more.
- Crescent Springs, Kentucky, was named by the International Labor Defense in 1930 as a place where "Negroes are not allowed to live."
- Shively, Kentucky, was the site of a violent incident in 1954 between the family of Black Korean War veteran Andrew Wade and the residents of all-White Shively. Wade had befriended the White Braden family, who purchased a home in Shively that was transferred to the Bradens. After moving into the house in May 1954, the Bradens found a burning cross in their yard, and the home was later bombed on June 27.

=== Louisiana ===
- Pollock, Louisiana, once had a sundown town sign during World War II.

=== Maryland ===
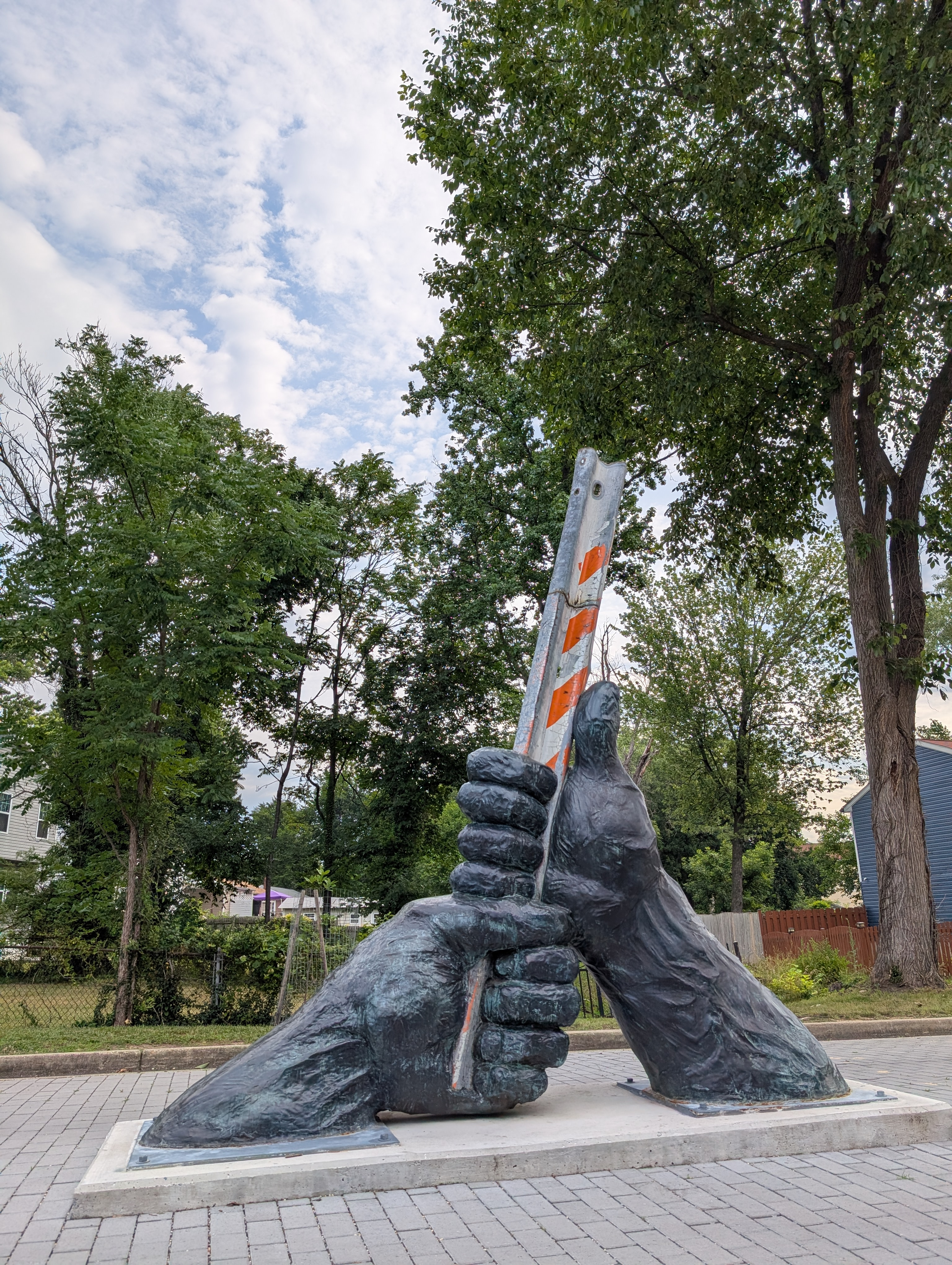
A sculpture on Windom Road, between North Brentwood, Maryland, a historically black community, and Brentwood, Maryland, shows two hands removing the original sundown town barrier between the towns.

- Brentwood, Maryland, erected a metal barrier in 1957 to separate the majority-White Brentwood from the historically Black town of North Brentwood. The barrier was later demolished and replaced with artwork in 2024.
- Silver Spring, Maryland, in the early 20th century, had an area covering more than ten square miles where racially restrictive deed covenants prevented African Americans from owning or renting homes.

=== Massachusetts ===
- Groton, Massachusetts, a town that was 90 percent White in 2020, was once a "Ku Klux Klan stronghold, rife with anti-Catholic and nativist prejudice", according to The Boston Globe. That year, a board in Groton voted to reject "wholeheartedly the designation" of the town still being a sundown town at present.

=== Michigan ===
- Dearborn, Michigan, from 1942 to 1978 had one mayor, Orville L. Hubbard, a vocal proponent of racial segregation and anti-miscegenation who spoke candidly to reporters about Dearborn's stance on Black people living there. Hubbard once told the Montgomery Advertiser, "They can't get in here. We watch it. Every time we hear of a Negro moving—for instance, we had one last year—in a response quicker than to a fire. That's generally known. It's known among our own people and it's known among the Negroes here."
- Owosso, Michigan, was reported in 1956 by the Montgomery Advertiser as a place "where Negroes are not allowed to live or even to stay overnight."
- Wyandotte, Michigan, is home to the Bacon Memorial District Library, which contains "about 50 pages of oral histories, along with local newspaper accounts and minutes from City Hall" about Wyandotte's history of the town's historic exclusion of Black people, which were originally gathered by librarian Edwina DeWindt for a chapter in a 1955 history of Wyandotte that was excluded from the final print.

=== Minnesota ===
- Edina, Minnesota, once had restrictive covenants preventing "any person other than one of the white or Caucasian race" (including Jews) from purchasing a home in its Country Club Historic District.

=== Missouri ===
- Doniphan, Missouri, was described as a place where "No negroes are allowed to live in the town" in 1900.
- Lamar, Missouri, was considered a sundown town prior to the civil rights movement.
- Monett, Missouri, once had signage reading, "Nigger, don't let the sun go down."
- Monroe City, Missouri, had a curfew in 1907 for Black people to leave the city streets by nightfall.
- St. John, Missouri, had a sign posted as late as 1939 that read, "Negro, don't let the sun set on your head here."
- Stone County, Missouri, was described along with Taney County in a 1904 news article as a place where Black people were "the last most woefully unwelcome in these two counties, where no negroes have been allowed to live for many years."
- Stoutsville, Missouri, forbade Black people from staying in the town after dark for at least 25 years prior to 1907. It once displayed a sign not far from the railroad station reading, "Mr. Nigger, don't let the sun set on you in Stoutsville."
- Sullivan, Missouri, was effectively a sundown town into the 1990s.
- Taney County, Missouri, was described along with Stone County in a 1904 news article as a place where Black people were "the last most woefully unwelcome in these two counties, where no negroes have been allowed to live for many years."

=== Nevada ===
- Gardnerville, Nevada, sounded a siren at 6:00 PM that was intended to warn Native Americans to vacate the area. The practice was ended in 2023 by SB 391, which passed before the Nevada legislature and was signed into law by the governor.
- Minden, Nevada, had sirens that sounded at 6:00 PM as a warning to Native Americans to leave the area no later than 6:30 PM. Minden's sundown ordinance went into effect in 1908, was expanded in 1917, and was eventually repealed in 1974. The siren was briefly turned off in 2006, the same year that a resolution passed to designate the siren to honor local volunteers, but local backlash pushed Minden to turn the siren back on two months later. The George Floyd protests of 2020 brought new attention to sundown town sirens, and though legislation was furthered in the state to end sundown sirens statewide, Minden argued against Nevada's proposed legislation because the siren was first activated after its sundown ordinance was instituted. Upon passage of Nevada's SB 391 in 2023, the siren was legally silenced.

=== New Jersey ===
- Hoboken, New Jersey, had only one Black family in 1901, to which a Brooklyn Daily Eagle article attributed to there being "no way for negroes to earn a livelihood in the city" and "a sort of unwritten law in the town that negroes are to be barred out."

=== New York ===
- Levittown, New York, was once a place where "Blacks and other minorities had no chance of getting in, because [founder] Levitt had decided from the start to admit only whites."

=== North Carolina ===
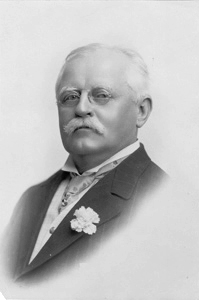
Julian S. Carr, Confederate States Army veteran and namesake of Carrboro, North Carolina

- Carrboro, North Carolina, was once "a sundown town dangerous for Black people to venture into at night past the railroad tracks." Carrboro's former mayor Robert Drakeford, first elected in 1977, called it a "sundown town" in a retrospective news article. Carrboro was named for Julian S. Carr, a White supremacist Democrat who never resided in Carrboro, who infamously remarked during the 1913 University of North Carolina dedication of the Confederate monument Silent Sam that he had horsewhipped "a negro wench until her skirts hung in shreds." In recent years, Carrboro has attempted to distance itself from its past, attempting to rename the municipality or honor another person named Carr.
- Mitchell County, North Carolina, was described in 1899 as a place where "no negroes are allowed to live or work."
- Pinebluff, North Carolina, forbade Black people from staying in the city overnight, according to a 1909 article. It read that, "negroes are not allowed to live within the corporate limits" of Pinebluff.
- Southern Pines, North Carolina, was described in 1898 as a place where "no negro is allowed to live or do business." A separate part of Southern Pines called "Jimtown" was set aside for Black people to live in, and when visiting the main part of the city, they were expected to be "models of quiet and orderly behavior."

=== Ohio ===
- Fairborn, Ohio, was described as a sundown town "up until recent years" in 1968.
- Greenhills, Ohio, was a place where "blacks were excluded" by restrictive covenants sometime before 1978.
- Marion, Ohio, hometown of United States President Warren G. Harding, enacted ethnic cleansing to remove its Black population in 1920.
- Reading, Ohio, was described in 1912 as a place where "negroes are not allowed to live[...]or stay there after dark".
- Utica, Ohio, a town that was 97 percent White as of 2017, once had a sundown town ordinance, according to a local historian.
- Waverly, Ohio, was described in 1900 as a place where "Negroes are not allowed to live".

=== Oklahoma ===
- Ada, Oklahoma, began allowing Black people to open restaurants, barber shops, stores, and hotels by court order as to offer places where "negro witnesses might stay during the [court] session". When threats to those people went unanswered, unnamed parties destroyed a Black restaurant with dynamite, seriously injuring one occupant.
- Bartlesville, Oklahoma, was described in 1907 as a place where "only a short time ago that negroes were not allowed to either live or die in Bartlesville."
- Blackwell, Oklahoma, once had a sign that read, "Negro, don't let the sun set on you here."
- Centralia, Oklahoma, was reported by the Kingfisher Free Press on October 10, 1901, as a place where "No negroes are allowed to live in the vicinity".
- Dougherty, Oklahoma, was described by The Daily Ardmoreite in a May 7, 1900, news article: "Negroes are not allowed to live in the corporate limits of Dougherty and none are allowed in town except on business and not for any cause are they allowed here after night."
- Durant, Oklahoma, was a place where "notices had been posted for the Negroes not to let the sun go down on them in said towns" in 1904.
- Edmond, Oklahoma, once had exclusionary housing covenants based on race, with one reading, "No person of any race, other than the Caucasian or American Indian shall ever own, use, or occupy any land or structure in this addition except that this covenant and restriction shall not apply to nor prevent occupancy of domestic servants of a different race domociled (sic) with an owner or tenant."
- Glencoe, Oklahoma, residents in 1901 responded to a group of 40 Black railroad workers with threats of "a visit from vigilants with ropes" for arriving in the historically all-White town, which prompted the United States Marshals Service to intervene in fear of a race war.
- Greer County, Oklahoma, once a part of Texas, was a sundown county from its founding until at least 1903.
- Henryetta, Oklahoma, once had a sign stating "Nigger, don't let the sun set on you."
- Holdenville, Oklahoma, was a place where "notices had been posted for the Negroes not to let the sun go down on them in said towns" in 1904.
- Marlow, Oklahoma, once had signs stating, "Negro, don't let the sun go down on you here." On December 17, 1923, an all-White mob confronted a White hotel owner and his Black porter before fatally shooting them.
- Norman, Oklahoma, was once a sundown town where Black people could not live or work and "dared not be seen after dark". A 1902 article described it as a place where "the negro is thought less of here than the Indian[...]They are hounded and driven out, mostly by the ultra abolitionists and hoodlums of the town." It remained a sundown town until the early 1960s, and Black people were discriminated in the housing market until the late 1960s.
- Stroud, Oklahoma, erected a sundown sign which read, "Nigger, don't let the sun go down on U", following white mob attacks on Black people in Stroud on August 24, 1901.

=== Oregon ===
The entire state of Oregon prohibited Blacks from entering by multiple laws starting in 1844; including in the state constitution. The law remained on the books until 1926, when it was overturned via referendum. The state's Black population remains lower than expected as a result.

- Ashland, Oregon, was a sundown town in the years before World War II.
- Eugene, Oregon, was considered a sundown town by sociologist James W. Loewen.
- Grants Pass, Oregon, was a sundown town in the years before World War II.
- Medford, Oregon, had a reputation of being a sundown town unwelcoming to "negroes and other racial minorities" prior to 1963. According to the Medford Mail Tribune, "In some cases of record, many years ago, police officers were assigned to see that no such individuals were permitted to remain here overnight."

=== Pennsylvania ===
- Levittown, Pennsylvania, once restricted home sales to those of "the Caucasian race", which was legal under the Federal Housing Administration prior to the outlawing of restrictive housing covenants.

=== South Dakota ===
- Lemmon, South Dakota, residents in 1919 prohibited Black people from staying in the city.

=== Tennessee ===
- Crossville, Tennessee, was a sundown town into the 1950s. It once had a sign reading, "Nigger, don't let the sun set on you here."
- Erwin, Tennessee, in 1918, had a mob murder a Black man, which forced the Black population to watch his body being burned, and then expelled all 131 of the town's Black men, women, and children; the Black population never returned.

=== Texas ===
- Alba, Texas, did not permit Black or Hispanic residents to live or work there.
- Alvin, Texas, was described as a place where "practically no negroes [we]re allowed to live" in 1933.
- Bibb, Texas, erected signage in 1886 reading "No negroes allowed in this town."
- Comanche County, Texas, residents expelled its Black population in 1886, ordering "all negroes to leave the county on penalty of death, and in De Leon, Bibb, Snipe Springs, Whittville, and Fleming signs [we]re hung out: "No negroes allowed in this town." A 1901 account from a former Comanche County resident recalls that the meeting "resolved to give every negro in the county one week's notice to leave the county, and committees of men from different sections of the county were appointed to carry out the will of the white people." By 1940, it was described as the "purest Anglo-Saxon population of any county in the United States."
- Dalhart, Texas, had a sign in 1934 reading "Black man don't let the sun go down on you here."
- De Leon, Texas, erected signage in 1886 reading "No negroes allowed in this town."
- Elmo, Texas, expelled its Black population and prohibited any new Black residents with an 1892 ordinance.
- Fleming, Texas, erected signage in 1886 reading "No negroes allowed in this town."
- Leggett, Texas, set rules for Black people including instituting a curfew, banning Black churches, and banishment for Black Americans visiting post offices or railroad stations.
- Snipe Springs, Texas, erected signage in 1886 reading "No negroes allowed in this town."
- Terrell, Texas, was described in 1892 as a place where "very few negroes are barely tolerated, and in many sections everything is done to discourage negro immigration."
- Vidor, Texas, kept an all-White population until federal judge William Wayne Justice desegregated its public housing project in 1993. Mimi Swartz of Texas Monthly wrote in December 1993 that Vidor not only had no Black residents but that it seemingly had "no trace of black culture". Swartz went on to say that Vidor expelled its Black population 70 years prior, noting that the Houston Chronicle described it as "a Klan stronghold" and that The New York Times called it "a hotbed of Klan activity." Its 1993 desegregation was met with "several months of terror at the hands of various white supremacist groups, unrelenting negative news coverage of the town, and as of last September, the restoration of Vidor to its monochromatic state." In the 2020 Census, more than 1,100 residents reported being at least partially of a non-white racial group.
- Whittville, Texas, erected signage in 1886 reading "No negroes allowed in this town."

=== Washington ===
- Kennewick, Washington, residents and law enforcement reportedly harassed and stopped people of color in the city during the daytime and nighttime. The city's racial discrimination practices were reported by The Spokesman-Review in 1954 as a contributing factor to its decision not to construct a community college. Following protests from the NAACP in 1963 (which referred to the city as the “Mississippi of the North”) against racial discrimination in Kennewick, the city's status as a sundown town led the Washington State Board of Discrimination to indict it for racial discrimination on July 9, 1963.

=== Wisconsin ===
- Appleton, Wisconsin, did not allow Black people to stay overnight in the city until around 1970.
- La Crosse, Wisconsin, proclaimed in 2016 an apology for the town's history as a sundown town.
- Manitowoc, Wisconsin, did not allow Black people to stay overnight as late as 1968.
- Sheboygan, Wisconsin, adopted a sundown ordinance in 1887, but it has long since been unenforced.
