= 1987 Forsyth County protests =

Civil rights demonstrations in Georgia, US

- Part of the post–civil rights era in African-American history
- Date: January 17, 1987 (first march); January 24, 1987 (second march)
- Location: Forsyth County, Georgia, United States; 34°12′23″N 84°8′23″W
- Caused by: Expulsion of black people following the 1912 racial conflict in Forsyth County, Georgia; Forsyth County's reputation as a sundown county
- Goals: Bring attention to legacy of racist activities in Forsyth County
- Methods: Marching; Public speeches
- Result: A bi-racial human relations committee was established by the county

Parties
Civil rights activists	White supremacists

Lead figures
Hosea Williams; Dean Carter; Tammie Carter	J. B. Stoner; David Duke; Don Black; Richard Barrett

Number
First march: Approximately 75; Second march: Approximately 20,000	First march: Approximately 400; Second march: Approximately 1,000–1,500

Casualties
- Arrested: First march: 8; Second march: 64

The 1987 Forsyth County protests were a series of civil rights demonstrations held in Forsyth County, Georgia, in the United States. The protests consisted of two marches, held one week apart on January 17 and January 24, 1987. The marches and accompanying counterdemonstrations by white supremacists drew national attention to the county. The second march was attended by many prominent civil rights activists and politicians, including both of Georgia's U.S. senators, and attracted about 20,000 marchers, making it one of the largest civil rights demonstrations in United States history.

At the time, Forsyth County was a rural county about 30 miles (48 km) northeast of Atlanta that had a history of violence and discrimination against African Americans, being a sundown county that was almost entirely populated by white Americans. In light of this, in 1987, a local resident announced plans for a march to occur on the weekend of Martin Luther King Jr. Day to draw attention to the county's history and continuing problems with race. Hosea Williams, a civil rights activist and politician in Atlanta, joined the project and helped lead a group of about 75 marchers through the county on January 17. The march was disrupted by a group of about 400 white supremacists, including members of the Ku Klux Klan, who injured several marchers, including Williams. The march was eventually called off and several Klansmen were arrested.

The violence attracted national and international attention to the county. Williams and other activists organized another march for January 24 that was attended by about 20,000 people, including several famous politicians and civil rights activists, such as both of Georgia's senators and Representative John Lewis. Between 1,000 and 1,500 white supremacist counter-protesters were present, though with roughly 3,000 law enforcement officials present (including over 1,000 members of the Georgia National Guard), there were few incidents of violence. About 64 people were arrested during the march, including white supremacists Don Black and David Duke. About two weeks after the second march, Oprah Winfrey traveled to Cumming to broadcast an episode of her talk show, interviewing several white residents. Some activists protested the show due to the producers' decisions to not have any African Americans on the show, and Williams and several others were arrested for unlawful assembly.

Following the marches, the county created a bi-racial human relations committee intended to address some of the issues raised by activists. Additionally, the Southern Poverty Law Center sued several white supremacist organizations and individuals for damages from the protests and won nearly $1 million in a federal case that resulted in the dissolution of one of the groups involved. Over the next several decades, the non-white population of Forsyth County increased, and by 2022, black people represented about 4 percent of the population, while about a quarter of the county was made up of Asian or Hispanic Americans.

== Background ==
=== 1912 racial conflict ===
Map of Georgia with Forsyth County in red

Forsyth County is a county located in north Georgia, about 30 miles (48 km) northeast of the state capital of Atlanta, with its county seat being the city of Cumming. For much of the 20th century, the primarily rural county had a long history of poor race relations and a reputation as a hostile place for African Americans. In 1912, an African American man was lynched by white Americans in the county due to allegations regarding the murder and rape of a white woman there. In the aftermath of this event, some white people known as "night riders" waged a months-long terror campaign of whitecapping that resulted in the expulsion of almost all African Americans from the county. (Note: A 1987 Los Angeles Times article by journalists David Treadwell and Barry Bearak regarding the 1912 events says, "Virtually no blacks have lived in Forsyth County in the 75 years since 1912, when hundreds of them were driven out by klan marauders after the brutal rape and murder of a young white girl that was attributed to three black youths". However, in his 2016 book Blood at the Root, professor Patrick Phillips states that the Ku Klux Klan, in its original form, had become defunct by 1872 and that "[f]or more than forty years after [1872], there was no Ku Klux Klan as we know it". The Klan would not be reconstituted until 1915, three years after the events in Forsyth County. Phillips refers to the individuals involved in the 1912 events as "night riders".) Prior to this, approximately 1,000 African Americans had been living there, with the county's total population being around 11,000.

=== Sundown county ===
Following the expulsion, Forsyth developed a reputation as a sundown county, where African Americans were not allowed to be in the county after nightfall. In the 1960s, signs were posted around the county reading, "Nigger–Don't Let the Sun Set on You in Forsyth County", including one on the lawn of the county courthouse. Also during this time, as Lake Lanier (which constituted the eastern border of the county) developed into a popular recreational destination, African American vacationers faced discrimination and threats from locals. In 1968, ten African American boys and their camp counselors were told by local residents to leave the county or they would be forcibly removed, and in 1976 there was a cross burning after an African American man rented a slipway at a nearby marina for his boat. Black truck drivers who traveled to the Tyson Foods chicken processing plant were often escorted by members of the Georgia Bureau of Investigation (GBI), while the early 1980s saw many black people shot in encounters with white people at the lake. Despite a steady growth in population through the 1970s and 1980s, the county was home to almost no African Americans, with the United States Census Bureau reporting that, of the county's 1980 population of 27,958 people, only one was black. (Note: In a 1993 book, historian Donald L. Grant questions the reliability of this data, saying, "The 1980 census indicated that one black lived in the county, although that person's existence was suspect". Additionally, a 1987 article in the Los Angeles Times states that local officials did not believe any African Americans were living in the county at that time.) By comparison, censuses taken in 1920 and 1960 had shown a black population of 30 and four, respectively. 1980 also saw the expansion of U.S. Route 19 in the county into a four-lane toll road, significantly decreasing the travel time between Cumming and Atlanta and causing the county to begin to develop into an exurban bedroom community for upper middle class white people who worked in Atlanta.

=== Proposed march ===
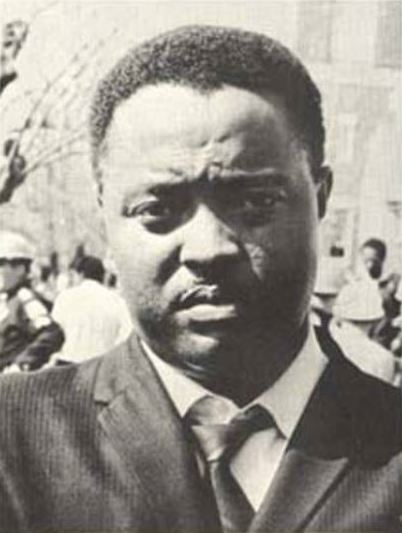
Civil rights activist Hosea Williams (pictured c. 1960s) was involved in organizing the January 17 march.

By 1987, the county had a population of around 38,000, of which about 99 percent was white, leading several media publications to refer to the county during this time as "all-white". That year, Charles A. Blackburn, a white resident of Cumming, announced plans for a civil rights march to draw attention to the county's racial problems. Blackburn backed out of the idea after receiving numerous death threats. Dean and Tammy Carter, two residents of Gainesville, Georgia, revived the idea and invited Hosea Williams, a civil rights activist and member of the Atlanta City Council, proposing a "March against Fear and Intimidation" in the county on January 17. (Note: While several sources specify that the march was revived by Dean and Tammy Carter, one source states that the Gainesville resident who revived the idea for the march was "Dean Williams".) The purpose of the march was to draw attention to the history and lasting legacy of the racial events in the county, including highlighting the fact that the county was still all-white. It was scheduled to take place the weekend before Martin Luther King Jr. Day, which had been established as a federal holiday only four years earlier, in 1983, and had quickly become, according to human rights activist and academic Leonard Zeskind, "a flashpoint for white supremacists".

In the weeks leading up to the march, Ku Klux Klan (KKK) groups and white supremacists in north Georgia began to coordinate plans to disrupt the event, which they said was being organized by "outside agitators and communist racemixers". The planned march was to occur against the backdrop of several high-profile racial incidents across the country, including an attack on three black people in Howard Beach, Queens, and a hazing incident at a military college in South Carolina wherein a black student was harassed by white students who had dressed as Klansmen. Regarding the racial climate at the time, activist and pastor Cecil Williams of the Glide Memorial United Methodist Church in San Francisco said, "Just when we thought we had swept the whirlwind of racism into the corners of society, now we see it is blowing back into the center of the floor". On January 17, the same day that the march in Forsyth County was scheduled, white supremacist groups had held a parade in Pulaski, Tennessee, the birthplace of the KKK, led by white supremacists Robert E. Miles and Thomas Robb.

== First march ==
The march occurred in Cumming on Saturday, January 17, with a group of about 75 demonstrators, (Note: Several sources state that approximately 75 individuals participated in the march. However, in 1987, activist A. James Rudin stated in an article in The Christian Science Monitor that there were 90 demonstrators, a figure repeated in a 2020 book by scholar Rodney A. Smolla. Meanwhile, a 1987 article in The New York Times stated that there were about 50 marchers, a number also given in a 2022 article in The Daily Beast. Additionally, a 1996 book by historian Paul A. Gilje states that there were about 60 marchers.) mostly from Atlanta. The group consisted of about two dozen local white people and several African American activists who traveled there by bus. Among those who participated were future author Patrick Phillips and his family, who were locals of the area, and state representative Billy McKinney. The march was planned to begin at Bethel View Road near an offramp of Georgia State Route 400 and go for several miles through the county until ending in Cumming. The demonstrators arrived late, and in the meantime, a group of about 400 counterdemonstrators, (Note: Most sources state that there were approximately 400 counterdermonstrators. However, a 1993 book by historian Donald L. Grant gives an estimate of approximately 500.) composed of Klansmen and individuals sympathetic to white supremacist ideology, had gathered to oppose the civil rights demonstration. Noted white supremacists J. B. Stoner, Daniel Carver, and Dave Holland, who was the grand dragon of a KKK organization, were present and gave speeches that energized the group of counterdemonstrators. During one speech, Stoner stated that allowing African Americans into Forsyth County would bring "crime and AIDS" to the area. Seeking to disrupt the march, these white supremacists gathered at the intersection of two county roads along the march's 2.5-mile (4.0 km) route, and some of the people carried Confederate battle flags and nooses. Klansmen constituted about ten percent of the total number of the counterdemonstrators there and were primarily members of one of two Klan organizations: The Southern White Knights and the Invisible Empire Knights of the Ku Klux Klan.

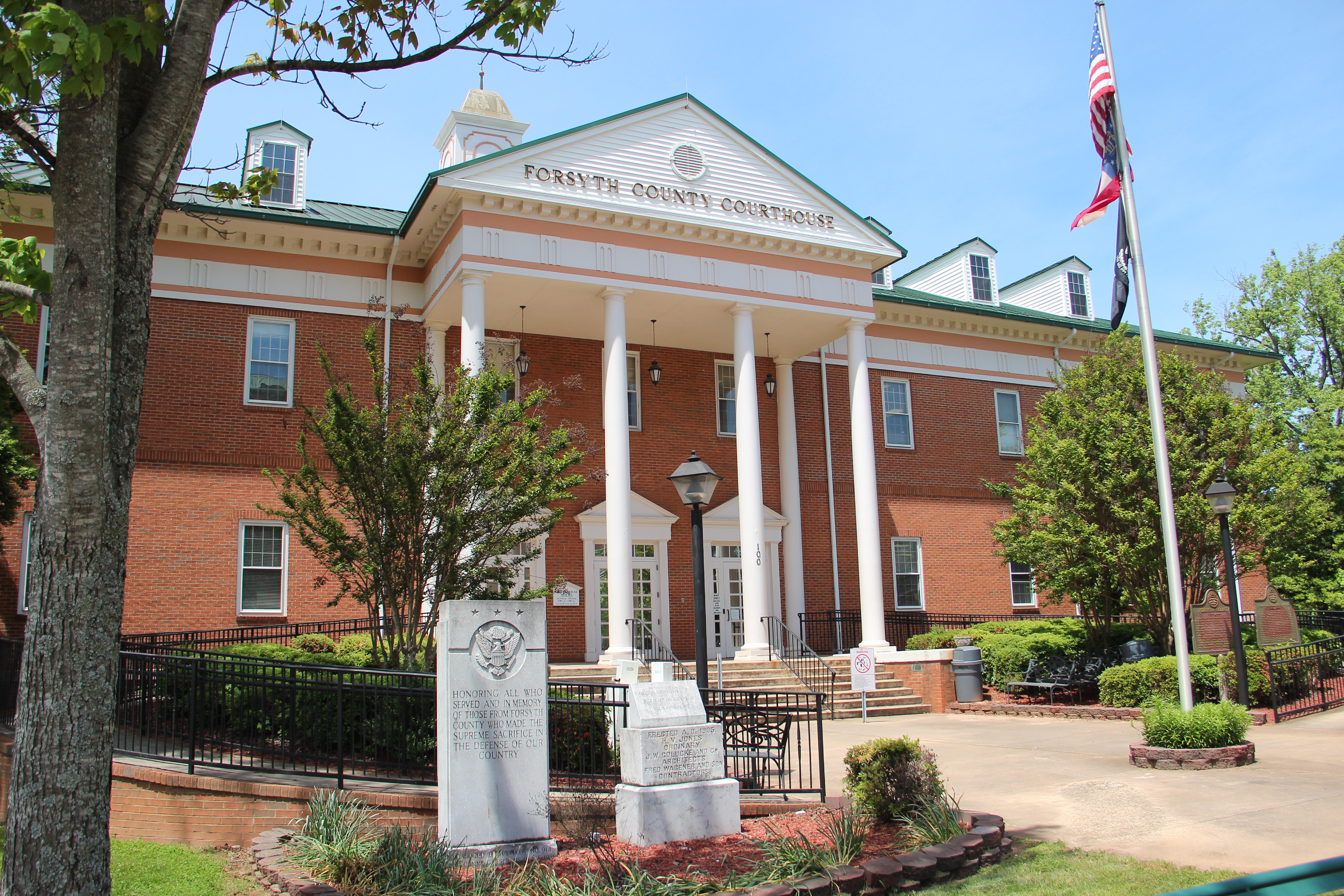
The old Forsyth County Courthouse, pictured 2015

In preparation for the march, about 75 local police officers and members of the Georgia State Patrol (GSP) were on duty, though both the law enforcement and the demonstrators were greatly outnumbered by the counterdemonstrators, as local officials had not expected their large turnout. As the march began, the large number of counterdemonstrators overwhelmed the police cordons that they had set up along the march's path, and many began to shout racial slurs and other obscenities at the marchers. At one point, Williams led marchers in singing "We Shall Overcome" as the counterdemonstrators chanted racial expletives. The event eventually turned violent as some counterdemonstrators began throwing rocks and bottles at the marchers, resulting in several people becoming injured. (Note: Sources vary on the number of individuals injured. A 1987 article in The New York Times states that four marchers suffered minor injuries, a number also given in a 2011 historical book by author John McKay, while a 1987 article in the Los Angeles Times states that 8 people were injured.) Williams was one of the injured, having been hit in the head by a brick. The violence ultimately prompted the march organizers to call off the event prematurely after law enforcement officials told them that they could not guarantee their safety. Law enforcement officials arrested 8 Klansmen, and all but one were residents of Forsyth County. After the march was called off, counterdemonstrators met at the Forsyth County Courthouse and listened to more speeches given by Stoner and other Klansmen. Former pro-segregation governor of Georgia Lester Maddox was also in attendance.

Speaking of the event later, Williams stated, "In thirty years in the civil rights movement, I haven't seen racism any more sick than here today". Talking to The New York Times, Williams compared the county to South Africa under apartheid and said that children as young as ten or 12 had yelled death threats and racial slurs at the marchers. The march and accompanying violence attracted national attention, and local leaders attempted to mitigate some of the bad publicity, with the chamber of commerce putting full-page advertisements on newspapers stating that the racists' actions did not represent the people of Forsyth County. Many local residents expressed frustration over the attention the march had drawn to their county, with one Forsyth County local telling The Atlanta Constitution, "we should have busted every camera down there and kicked every reporter's ass". In the aftermath of the march, the Mead Corporation cancelled plans they had for constructing a 5,000-worker plant in the county.

== Second march ==
On January 19, Williams and Dean Carter announced their intention to hold another march in Forsyth County on the following Saturday, January 24. Williams called it a "March for Brotherhood" and said it would be the largest civil rights demonstration since the civil rights movement of the 1960s. This march drew both national and international attention, with The New York Times reporting on it with a front-page story, and saw the participation of about 20,000 demonstrators. (Note: Sources vary on the number of demonstrators present, with most sources giving estimates of about 20,000. On the high end, several sources give estimates of about 25,000, while on the low end, both a 1987 article in The New York Times and a 2022 article in The Daily Beast give a range of between 12,000 and 20,000, and a 1987 article from the St. Petersburg Times gives a range of between 15,000 and 20,000. Activist A. James Rudin, who attended the march, stated in an article for The Christian Science Monitor that there were 15,000 attendees. According to that article in The New York Times, the figure of 20,000 was the estimate given by march organizers, while sheriff's deputies in the county gave an estimate of between 12,000 to 14,000 and a spokesperson for the National Guard gave an estimate of between 15,000 to 20,000.) The number of demonstrators was four to five times the number of participants that the organizers had expected, and they said that there had been an additional 4,000 people in Atlanta who would have participated but were unable to come to Cumming due to a lack of transportation. In total, about 175 buses provided by the Metropolitan Atlanta Rapid Transit Authority were used in getting demonstrators from the King Center for Nonviolent Social Change in Atlanta to Cumming, and when this proved insufficient, an additional ten buses were brought in. A significant portion of the participants were white, (Note: A 1987 article in the Los Angeles Times estimates that about a third of the marchers were white, while a 1987 article in the St. Petersburg Times gives an estimate of "[a]t least half".) over half appeared to be under the age of 30, and some traveled from distant places such as California, New York, and Nigeria to participate.

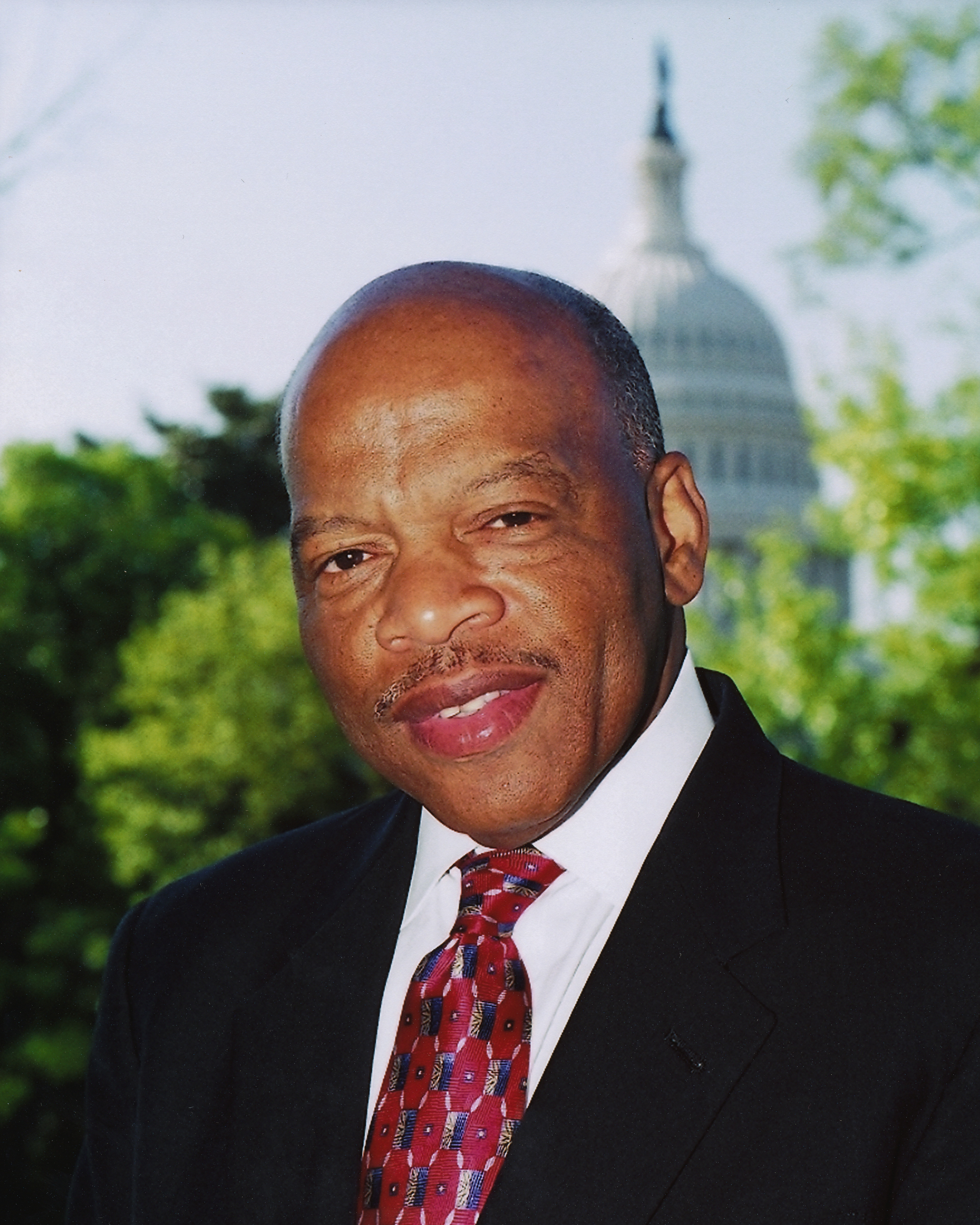
U.S. Representative John Lewis (pictured 2003) was one of several politicians and civil rights activists who marched in Forsyth County on January 24.

The march was scheduled to begin at 11 a.m., but due to the size of the crowd, the start was delayed by over three hours, commencing at about 2:20 p.m. The protestors met at a shopping center on the outskirts of Cumming and began the roughly 1.25-mile (2.01 km) march, beginning at an offramp of Georgia 400 at Georgia State Route 20, traveling mostly along Georgia State Route 9, and terminating at the Forsyth County Courthouse in downtown Cumming. Once there, several speeches would be given at the courthouse square. Due again to the large number of people participating, the march took about 2 hours to complete, with some areas having people walk eight-to-12 people abreast. Many notable individuals participated in the march, including numerous politicians and civil rights leaders. Both of the U.S. senators from Georgia, Sam Nunn and Wyche Fowler, marched, along with U.S. Representative John Lewis, a civil rights activist who had participated in the Selma to Montgomery marches. Other politicians included former senator and presidential candidate Gary Hart and Atlanta Mayor Andrew Young, who said of the march, "This march had to take place, for we once again had to say: 'We ain't gonna let nobody turn us round'". Other noted civil rights activists included Southern Christian Leadership Conference president Joseph Lowery, NAACP executive director Benjamin Hooks, A. James Rudin of the American Jewish Committee, Ralph Abernathy, Dick Gregory, Jesse Jackson, and Coretta Scott King, the widow of Martin Luther King Jr.

As with last time, there was a large number of white supremacists who had gathered in Forsyth County, numbering over 1,000. (Note: Sources vary on the number of counterdemonstrators present. A 2020 book by scholar Rodney A. Smolla states that there were "over one thousand" counterdemonstrators, a number echoed by reporter Tyler Bridges in a 1994 book. However, a 1987 article in the Los Angeles Times states that 1,200 were expected to show up, a 1989 book by academic Ted Robert Gurr stated that there were 1,500 people, a 1987 article in the St. Petersburg Times states that there were 2,000 counterdemonstrators, and a 1990 book by historian Michael Zatarain stated that "[o]ver 5,000 whites from across the U.S." arrived in Forsyth County. A 2009 book by activist and academic Leonard Zeskind says that "several thousand white people" gathered along the roadsides to protest the march, later specifying that there were about 3,000 counterdemonstrators. A 2011 historical book by author John McKay states that estimates of the counterdemonstrators vary considerably because they were difficult to distinguish from other onlookers of the march, but estimates that, of the approximately 5,000 onlookers, about 1,000 to 1,500 were white supremacist counterdemonstrators.) Many of these individuals, which included neo-Nazis from organizations in the surrounding states, participated in a countermarch led by white nationalist lawyer Richard Barrett of Mississippi. Among these individuals was David Duke, a former member of the KKK and the president of the National Association for the Advancement of White People, a white supremacist group. Duke had come to the march at the invitation of Atlanta racial extremist Ed Fields and a local group called the Committee to Keep Forsyth White, and he was joined by fellow former Klansman Don Black and Maddox. According to Duke, he was protesting because, "If blacks moved into Forsyth County, it would mean the death of whites. They would become the victims of murders, assaults, robberies and drug pushers. That’s the reality of integration". Despite the large turnout, leaders from two large Klan organizations, including Holland, ordered their members not to attend, as they thought the march was a plot by the Federal Bureau of Investigation (FBI) to arrest Klansmen.

In addition to the increased number of counterdemonstrators, there was also a significant increase in the number of law enforcement officials present. Approximately 3,000 officers, including around 2,000 members of the Georgia National Guard who were dressed in riot gear, (Note: Sources vary on the number of National Guard members present, with numbers ranging between 1,500, 1,700 and 2,300. Meanwhile, a 1987 article in The New York Times states that there were 2,300 "guardsmen and police officers".) 600 police officers from jurisdictions around the state, 350 GSP troopers, 185 GBI agents, and 40 armed rangers from the Georgia Department of Natural Resources, were present at the demonstration. The FBI coordinated law enforcement efforts with local authorities, and federal law enforcement agents were also present and marched with William Bradford Reynolds, the United States Assistant Attorney General for the Civil Rights Division, who stated that "what started last week will be repeated without violence". This was also in line with a pledge made by Forsyth County Sheriff Wesley Walraven, who had told Williams after the first march was called off that he would guarantee the protestors safety if they returned next weekend. Regarding the number of law enforcement officials present, a spokesperson for Georgia Governor Joe Frank Harris stated that it was "the greatest show of force on the part of the state of Georgia in history".

14 counterdemonstrators were arrested before the march began, with 4 of those individuals being identified as Klansmen. In total, about 64 people were arrested either before or during the march. (Note: Sources vary on the number of arrests made, with many sources giving ranges of between 55 and 60. However, a 1994 book by reporter Tyler Bridges gives an exact number of 64 people arrested, including Duke and Barrett.) Duke and Black were among those arrested during the march for attempting to block a highway. The counterdemonstrators yelled slurs and expletives at the marchers and, as in the previous march, threw some projectiles that resulted in a few injuries. (Note: Multiple sources state that there were some injuries, though a 1987 article in The New York Times stated that no injuries had been reported.) One man was hit by a cement block and a woman was struck by a steel pipe, but, according to a report by the Los Angeles Times, "the march was not marred by major clashes or injuries". Out of safety concerns, GBI officials at the courthouse square did not allow Fowler, Lewis, or Nunn to cross the street to speak to reporters or allow reporters access to the courthouse square. A spokesperson for the governor stated, "When you consider the size of the crowd, this was a pretty peaceful march". By 6:30 p.m., buses began to transport demonstrators back to Atlanta.

== The Oprah Winfrey Show broadcast from Cumming ==
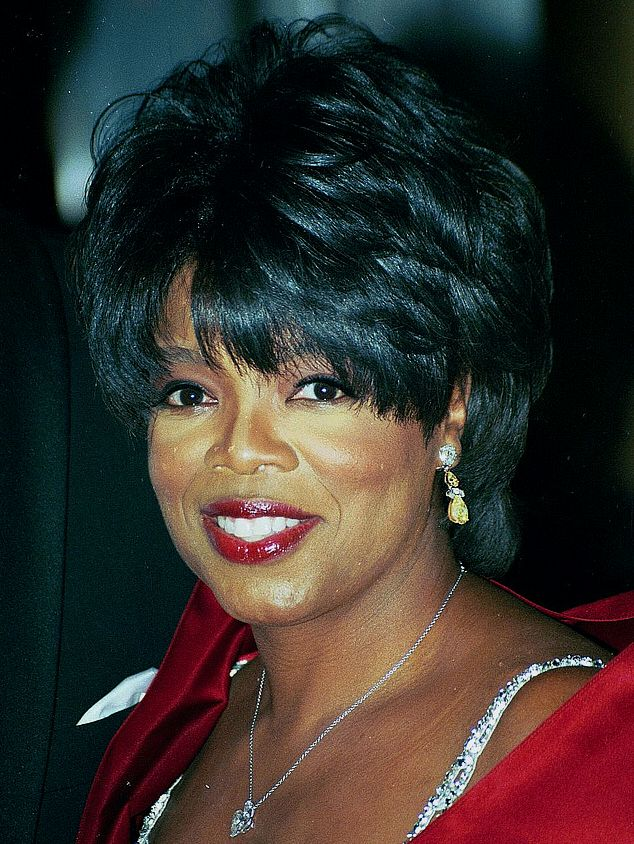
Following the marches, Oprah Winfrey (pictured 1997) broadcast an episode of her talk show from Cumming.

On February 9, about two weeks after the second march, television talk show host Oprah Winfrey traveled to Cumming to broadcast an episode of her talk show, The Oprah Winfrey Show. At the time, the show had only been on the air for about five months, and the episode marked the first time that the show was recorded somewhere other than its regular studio. For the episode, Winfrey had an all-white audience of about 100 Forsyth County residents that she talked to about the marches and the county's history of racial issues. During the episode, several locals expressed racist sentiments to Oprah and opined in favor of the county remaining all-white, while others were more sympathetic to the marchers and expressed dismay at the racist attitudes of some of the residents. While Williams had asked to appear on the show, Winfrey and the show's producers declined, stating that they only wanted county residents. This prompted a protest led by Williams outside of the restaurant that the episode was being recorded at. In the aftermath, eight individuals, including Williams, were arrested on charges of unlawful assembly, with Williams also being charged with blocking a state highway. Asked after the episode completed filming how she felt about being in the county, Winfrey, a black woman, stated, "Not very comfortable at all. I’m leaving".

== Aftermath ==
=== Legacy ===
Multiple news sources, such as the Los Angeles Times and The New York Times, and academics have made note of the size of the January 24 march, with many sources referring to it as one of the largest civil rights demonstrations in the history of the Southern United States. According to journalists David Treadwell and Barry Bearak, some activists from the civil rights movement of the 1960s viewed the march as the start of a possible resurrection of the movement, with Williams saying, "The civil rights family has not been together like this since we buried Martin Luther King". Civil rights activist Ozell Sutton, who was a regional director of the United States Department of Justice's office of community relations at that time, also spoke positively about the march, saying, "This outpouring of black and white and all racial groups is an indication of a deep and abiding concern [for civil rights]". Martin Luther King III, the eldest son of Martin Luther King Jr., stated that his father would have seen the march as "a great demonstration of brotherhood and love". Following the protests, Governor Harris organized an investigation into the protests. According to historian Wendy Hamand Venet, his committee finding that the state's flag, which prominently featured a Confederate battle flag as part of its design, "was a factor inciting racism and violence and recommended its removal". The protests ultimately led to a revival over the issue of the state flag, with many prominent politicians and activists calling for the removal of the Confederate symbol from the flag. Following the white supremacist Unite the Right rally in Charlottesville, Virginia, in 2017 that resulted in the death of a counter-protester in a terrorist attack, several publications made comparisons between the violence there and that witnessed in Forsyth County in 1987.

=== Changes in Forsyth County ===
Following the marches, local leaders in Forsyth County publicly deplored the actions of the Klansmen and offered apologies to the marchers. Additionally, on February 9, they announced the creation of a biracial human relations committee to help address racial issues in the county. The committee included six white county leaders and six African-Americans, with three of the latter being appointed by the six white members and another two being appointed by Williams and his colleagues. Forsyth County's population continued to grow over the next several decades, with the 1990 United States census reporting a total population of 49,000. By 2019, this number had increased to approximately 245,000. As the population grew, so too did the number of non-white residents in the county. In 1990, the county had 14 black residents, but by 2019, African Americans constitute 2.6 percent of the population, growing to about four percent by 2022. Additionally, by that year, a quarter of the population was made up of either Asian Americans or Hispanic Americans. Throughout this time, the county has played host to several other civil rights protests, including a march in August 1992 in recognition the fifth anniversary of the 1987 marches. This march, which included about 40 people led by Williams, involved about 200 police officers and was counter-demonstrated by about 350 white supremacists, including members of the Nationalist Movement. In June 2020, amidst the George Floyd protests in Georgia, about 1,000 people protested for civil rights and racial justice. The protests were peaceful, and while there were rumors that counterdemonstrators from the Nationalist Movement would disrupt the event, this did not occur.

=== Impact on white supremacist organizations ===
==== Southern Poverty Law Center's lawsuit ====
Following the protests, the Southern Poverty Law Center (SPLC), a civil rights legal advocacy organization, filed a lawsuit against 11 Klansmen and two Klan organizations (the Invisible Empire and the Southern White Knights) for damages related to their attack on January 17. In October 1988, a federal jury ordered the organizations and individuals to pay almost $1 million in damages to the marchers. The Invisible Empire was ordered to pay about $800,000 of this judgement. As a result of the ruling, James Farrands, the leader of the Invisible Empire, agreed to relinquish all of the organization's assets, including its name, and personally paid $37,500 to the affected marchers. By the middle of 1993, due to the settlement, the organization was defunct.

==== Forsyth County v. Nationalist Movement ====
The total cost of the law enforcement presence for the second march was over $670,000 (equivalent to $1,600,000 in 2021). Of this amount, the government of Georgia paid $579,148, other governmental agencies paid $29,759, and the county covered the remainder. In light of this, on January 27, 1987, the Forsyth County Board of Commissioners passed an ordinance requiring permits for rallies and demonstrations and requiring the groups holding these events to cover some of the costs associated with law enforcement protections, with a later amendment capping the cost of the daily fees at $1,000.

This came up in January 1989, when the Nationalist Movement made plans to hold a demonstration on the steps of the Forsyth County Courthouse in opposition of Martin Luther King Jr. Day. Following the ordinance, the county charged the group $100 in permit fees. However, rather than pay the fee, the Nationalist Movement sued the county, alleging that the fees violated their freedom of speech under the provisions of the First Amendment to the United States Constitution. The case made its way before the Supreme Court of the United States, with the American Civil Liberties Union writing an amicus brief in favor of the Nationalist Movement. In the end, the Supreme Court decided in favor of the Nationalist Movement, ruling that the county's permit fees system was unconstitutional.

==== David Duke ====
According to reporter Tyler Bridges, Duke's involvement in the protests marked the beginning of his "political comeback". The counterdemonstration marked his first public appearance in five years, and he used the increased media attention to get interviews with many national media publications, causing his national profile to increase among white supremacist circles. Following the protests, Klan and activity in north Georgia increased. During this time, on February 22, 1987, Duke and Barrett held a white supremacist rally near Cumming that attracted about 125 people, and during a March 7, speech before white nationalist Populist Party members, Duke stated that the Forsyth counterdemonstrations marked "the genesis of an entirely new movement" for white nationalism. That year, Duke announced his presidential campaign for the 1988 election, with Bridges stating that, "Forsyth County had reminded leaders of the white supremacist movement that Duke was their best spokesman". Duke held his campaign kickoff event in nearby Marietta, Georgia, and officially announced his candidacy on the steps of the Georgia State Capitol in Atlanta, with the locations chosen at least in part due to their proximity to Forsyth County.

== Sources ==
- Barnes, Robin (1997). "Blue by Day and White by [K]night". In Delgado, Richard; Stefancic, Jean (eds.). Critical White Studies: Looking Behind the Mirror. Philadelphia: Temple University Press. pp. 561–565. ISBN 978-1-56639-532-8.
- Baudouin, Richard, ed. (1997). The Ku Klux Klan: A History of Racism & Violence (Fifth ed.). Montgomery, Alabama: Southern Poverty Law Center. ISBN 978-0-7881-7031-7.
- Bridges, Tyler (1994). The Rise of David Duke. Jackson, Mississippi: University Press of Mississippi. ISBN 978-0-87805-684-2.
- Byrd, Robert (February 9, 1987). "Oprah Winfrey Brings Her Show To Forsyth County". AP News. Archived from the original on November 11, 2022.
- Clendinen, Dudley (January 25, 1987). "Thousands in Civil Rights March Jeered by Crowd in Georgia Town". The New York Times. p. 1. ISSN 0362-4331. Archived from the original on November 26, 2022.
- Cobb, James C. (2008). Georgia Odyssey: A Short History of the State (2nd ed.). Athens, Georgia: University of Georgia Press. ISBN 978-0-8203-3050-1.
- Coppa, Frank J. (2000). County Government: A Guide to Efficient and Accountable Government. Westport, Connecticut: Praeger Publishers. ISBN 978-0-275-96829-8.
- Dodd, Sophia (March 13, 2023). "Forsyth 1912: A Timeline of the Forced Exile of Black Residents from Forsyth County". Atlanta History Center. Archived from the original on March 13, 2023.
- Elliott-Tenort, Debra (August 22, 1992). "White Supremacists Protest Civil Rights March in Forsyth County". AP News. Archived from the original on April 6, 2022.
- Gerstenfeld, Phyllis B. (2013). Hate Crimes: Causes, Controls, and Controversies (3rd ed.). New York City: SAGE Publishing. ISBN 978-1-4522-5662-7.
- Gilje, Paul A. (1996). Rioting in America. Bloomington, Indiana: Indiana University Press. ISBN 978-0-253-32988-2.
- Grant, Donald L. (1993). Grant, Jonathan (ed.). The Way it was in the South: The Black Experience in Georgia. Introduction by Jonathan Grant. Athens, Georgia: University of Georgia Press. ISBN 978-0-8203-2329-9.
- Gurr, Ted Robert (1989). "Protest and Rebellion in the 1960s: The United States in World Perspective". In Gurr, Ted Robert (ed.). Violence in America. Vol. 2: Protest, Rebellion, Reform. Newbury Park, California: SAGE Publications. pp. 101–130. ISBN 978-0-8039-3230-2.
- Holloway, Kali (May 17, 2022) [February 15, 2021]. "The Sickening History of Marjorie Taylor Greene's Hometown". The Daily Beast. Archived from the original on December 26, 2022.
- Ingwerson, Marshall (January 23, 1987a). "Facing a racial reckoning. Georgia town prepares for civil rights march". The Christian Science Monitor. Christian Science Publishing Society. ISSN 0882-7729. Archived from the original on July 26, 2022.
- Ingwerson, Marshall (February 13, 1987b). "Forsyth County march ignites dreams and doubts for civil rights". The Christian Science Monitor. Christian Science Publishing Society. ISSN 0882-7729. Archived from the original on January 21, 2022.
- Jaspin, Elliot (2007). Buried in the Bitter Waters: The Hidden History of Racial Cleansing in America. New York City: Basic Books. ISBN 978-0-465-03637-0.
- King, Larry (May 11, 2017) [January 25, 1987]. "Looking Back: Civil rights protestors take back Forsyth County (January 25, 1987)". Tampa Bay Times. Times Publishing Company. Archived from the original on May 25, 2022.
- King, Michael (June 6, 2020). "Hundreds turn out at Forsyth County civil rights protest". WXIA-TV.
- McKay, John (2011). It Happened in Atlanta: Remarkable Events That Shaped History (First ed.). Augusta, Georgia: Morris Book Publishing, LLC. ISBN 978-0-7627-6826-4.
- Nesbitt, Jim (February 10, 1987). "Forsyth Police Arrest 8 During Winfrey Protest". Orlando Sentinel. Tribune Publishing.
- "Forsyth County Protest". New Georgia Encyclopedia. Archived from the original on December 29, 2022.
- "White Protestors Disrupt 'Walk for Brotherhood' in Georgia Town". The New York Times. January 18, 1987. p. 24. ISSN 0362-4331. Archived from the original on April 6, 2022.
- "Oprah Visits a County Where No Black Person Had Lived for 75 Years". Oprah.com. Archived from the original on June 25, 2022.
- Perlmutter, Dawn (2004). Investigating Religious Terrorism and Ritualistic Crimes. Boca Raton, Florida: CRC Press. ISBN 978-1-4200-4104-0.
- Phillips, Patrick (2016). Blood at the Root: A Racial Cleansing in America. New York City: W. W. Norton & Company. ISBN 978-0-393-29302-9.
- Phillips, Patrick (August 19, 2017). "Charlottesville Was Not a Surprise". Slate. Archived from the original on April 23, 2021.
- Plyburn, Jay (June 6, 2020). "Nearly 1,000 people protest peacefully in downtown Cumming". WXIA-TV.
- Poole, Shelia; Murchison, Adrianne (March 24, 2022). "Increasingly diverse, Forsyth County faces racist past". The Atlanta Journal-Constitution. ISSN 1539-7459. Archived from the original on August 13, 2022.
- Renstrom, Peter (2012). "Overview of the First Amendment". In Lind, Nancy S.; Rankin, Erik T. (eds.). First Amendment Rights: An Encyclopedia. Vol. One: Traditional Issues on the First Amendment. Santa Barbara, California: ABC-Clio. pp. 11–132. ISBN 978-1-61069-213-7.
- Rudin, A. James (February 12, 1987). "On bigotry and the need to keep marching". The Christian Science Monitor. Christian Science Publishing Society. ISSN 0882-7729. Archived from the original on September 27, 2022.
- Smolla, Rodney A. (2020). Confessions of a Free Speech Lawyer: Charlottesville and the Politics of Hate. Ithaca, New York: Cornell University Press. ISBN 978-1-5017-4967-4.
- Treadwell, David (January 23, 1987). "Klan-Marcher Confrontation Feared: Georgia County Bracing for Black-White Conflict". Los Angeles Times. Archived from the original on August 15, 2022.
- Treadwell, David; Bearak, Barry (January 25, 1987). "20,000 March Against Klan Attack in Georgia: 60 Arrested but No Major Violence or Injuries Reported in Biggest Rights Protest in Decades". Los Angeles Times. Archived from the original on December 26, 2022.
- Venet, Wendy Hamand (2020). Gone but Not Forgotten: Atlantans Commemorate the Civil War. Athens, Georgia: University of Georgia Press. ISBN 978-0-8203-5813-0.
- Zatarain, Michael (1990). David Duke: Evolution of a Klansman. New Orleans: Pelican Publishing Company. ISBN 978-0-88289-817-9.
- Zeskind, Leonard (2009). Blood and Politics: The History of the White Nationalist Movement from the Margins to the Mainstream. New York City: Farrar, Straus and Giroux. ISBN 978-1-4299-5933-9.
