= The Racist Mind =

- Author: Raphael S. Ezekiel
- Publisher: Viking
- Publication date: 1995
- ISBN: 9780670839582

The Racist Mind: Portraits of American Neo-Nazis and Klansmen is a book by Raphael S. Ezekiel. It attempts to provide sociological and psychological insights into White supremacist groups, including neo-Nazi groups and the Ku Klux Klan, and their members.

The book is divided into three parts: "Gatherings" (relating the author's attendance at rallies, trials, and congresses), "National Leaders" (Tom Metzger, Dave Holland, and Richard Butler), and "Detroit" (portraits of the members of a neo-Nazi group).

It was published by Viking Press in 1995 (hardcover, 368 pages, ISBN 0-670-83958-2); it was reprinted in paperback by Penguin in 1996 (ISBN 0-14-023449-7).

== Contents ==
- Acknowledgments
- Note on Names and Pseudonyms
- Introduction
- Part One: Gatherings

One: Klan Rally at Stone Mountain, Georgia
Two: Breakfast in Arkansas – Sedition Trial
Three: Aryan Nations Congress – Northern Idaho

- Part Two: National Leaders

Four: Introduction
Five: Tom Metzger: White Aryan Resistance
Six: Dave Holland: Southern White Knights
Seven: Richard Butler: Aryan Nations
Eight: Reflections

- Part Three: Detroit

Nine: Introduction
Ten: Contact
Eleven: Paul
Twelve: Terri
Thirteen: William
Fourteen: Raymond and Rosandra
Fifteen: Francis
Sixteen: Joey, Eddie
Seventeen: Nolan
Eighteen: Reflections

- Epilogue
- Appendix: Suggested Reading
