= General Association of General Baptists =

American Christian denomination

The General Association of General Baptists is a Baptist Christian denomination in the United States. It is affiliated with the National Association of Evangelicals and the Baptist World Alliance. The headquarters are located in Poplar Bluff, Missouri, where they operate Stinson Press.

A distinct belief is the general atonement (that Christ died for all persons).

== History ==
Though theologically similar to the General Baptists in England and early America, this body of General Baptists arose in the Midwestern and Southern United States in the 19th century through the work of Benoni Stinson (1798-1869), a United Baptist minister first in Kentucky and then in Indiana. Stinson was ordained in Kentucky in 1821, and evidently was already leaning toward or embracing Arminian theology. Shortly after he moved to Indiana, in 1822 the Wabash District Association decided to divide into two bodies, for convenience sake. Stinson's church would be in the new body, and he labored to have a statement that "the preaching that Christ tasted death for every man shall be no bar to fellowship" would be included in the articles of faith. The next fall, in 1823, the Liberty Baptist Church of Howell, Indiana, was organized with 33 members, and Elder Stinson was called as pastor. Three other churches were soon organized, all in the Evansville, Indiana, area. In October 1824, representatives from these four churches came together and organized the Liberty Association of General Baptists. This appears to be the first time the name "General" was officially associated with this movement. A number of General Baptist local associations were organized from 1824 to 1870. During this period, some attempts were made by the Liberty Association to correspond with the northern Free Will Baptists, but this appears to have eventually proved unsatisfactory to both parties. In 1870, a convention was called to meet with Harmony Church, Gallatin County, Illinois, with the idea of organizing a general association comprising all the annual General Baptist associations. Delegates from Liberty, Mt. Olivet and Ohio associations gathered and formed the General Association of General Baptists.

According to a denomination census released in 2023, it claimed 47,193 members and 793 churches.

The official denominational publication is The General Baptist Messenger. The General Association oversees publication of Sunday School literature, a home mission board, a foreign mission board, and the Oakland City University in Oakland City, Indiana.

== Sources ==
- History of the General Baptists, by Ollie Latch
- History of the General Baptists, by T. A. Laslie
- Baptists Around the World, by Albert W. Wardin, Jr.
- Dictionary of Baptists in America, Bill J. Leonard, editor
