= 1912 racial conflict in Forsyth County, Georgia =

Racially motivated violence and subsequent racial cleansing in Forysth County in 1912

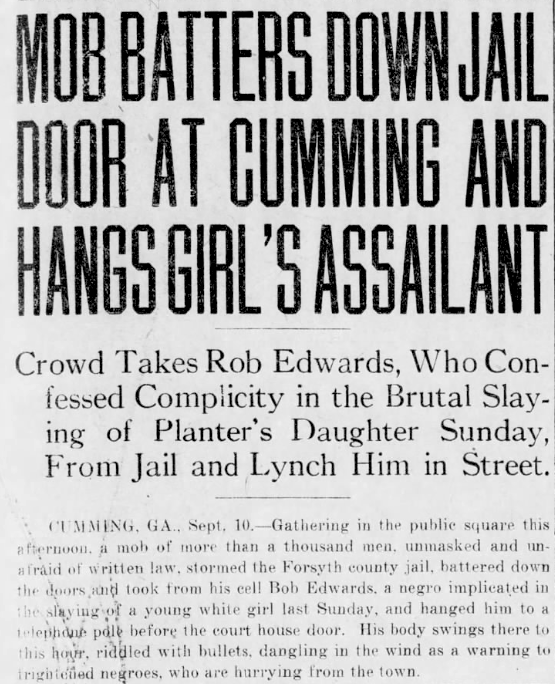
Headline and lead paragraph in The Atlanta Georgian of September 10, 1912, reporting the lynching of Rob Edwards

Location of Forsyth County within the U.S. state of Georgia

In Forsyth County, Georgia, in September 1912, two separate alleged attacks on white women in the Cumming area resulted in black men being accused as suspects. First, a white woman reportedly awoke to find a black man in her bedroom. Days later, a white teenage girl was beaten and raped, later dying of her injuries.

Following the first alleged assault, a black preacher who made disparaging remarks about the victim was harshly beaten. Local law enforcement locked the preacher inside the courthouse overnight to protect him from the mob waiting outside. Other black men, arrested in connection with the alleged assault, were moved to Atlanta for their safety. A grand jury dropped the case months later.

Following the second assault, a 16-year-old black boy was linked to the attack by a pocket mirror sold to him at a local store. He confessed, under duress, and implicated accomplices. Rob Edwards was one of the men arrested and held in the small jail in Cumming. He was taken from the jail by a white mob and shot and beaten to death, and his body was hanged from a telephone pole. The 16-year-old and a 17-year-old black boy were later convicted by an all-white jury after the older boy's sister testified against both them and sentenced to death by hanging. The sentences were carried out weeks later in what became a public execution. Immediately prior to his execution, the younger black boy made a voluntary confession of his guilt. However, his older codefendant maintained his innocence.

In the following months, a group of men called "Night Riders" (Note: The Ku Klux Klan had disbanded in the early 1870s and did not re-form until 1915.) terrorized black citizens, warning them to leave in 24 hours or be killed. Those who resisted were subjected to further harassment, including shots fired into their homes, or livestock killed. An estimated 98% of the black residents of Forsyth County left.

== Background ==
External audio
- The 'Racial Cleansing' That Drove 1,100 Black Residents Out Of Forsyth County, Ga., 38:57, Fresh Air with Terry Gross, NPR, September 15, 2016.

After the American Civil War, black enslaved persons in the South were emancipated and granted citizenship and the franchise through constitutional amendments. But by the turn of the 20th century, all Southern states disfranchised blacks by passing constitutions and other laws to impede voter registration and voting. Georgia Democrats passed such a law in 1908, resulting in the disfranchisement of blacks in the state. In addition, the white-dominated Southern legislatures passed laws imposing racial segregation in public facilities, and Jim Crow customs ruled. Most rural blacks worked as sharecroppers on white-owned land, and were seldom able to get free from poverty.

The 1906 Atlanta race riot was waged by whites against blacks, and reflected tensions in a city that was rapidly changing. Dr. Ansel Strickland, a doctor in Cumming, Georgia, wrote a firsthand account saying that "hundreds of Black were killed" by whites in the Atlanta riot. The rate of lynchings of blacks by whites in Georgia and the South had been high since the late 19th century, and accounts of lynchings were regularly published in the local papers, often maintaining that the blacks were responsible, guilty either of a crime or poor attitude. Lynchings were a means by whites to enforce white supremacy in social affairs, and ensure that blacks stayed in line.

The presence of mixed race individuals suggests that the official ban against interracial relationships was not absolute, including historical accounts of light-skinned slaves being fathered by white owners. At the time of the 1910 census, Georgia's Forsyth County was recorded as having more than 10,000 whites, 858 blacks and 440 mulattoes (mixed race).

== Ellen Grice incident ==
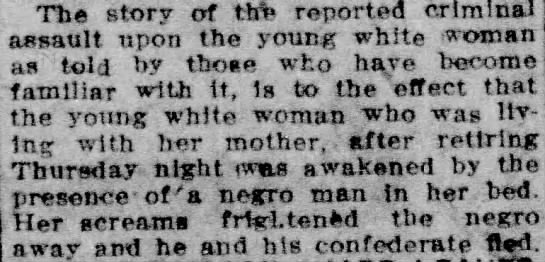
Newspaper report in The Columbus Ledger of September 8, 1912

On the night of September 5, 1912, a white woman named Ellen Grice (Note: The woman's name did not appear in contemporary newspaper reports; a 1987 article in The Atlanta Journal-Constitution named her as Ellen Grice, but earlier examples are lacking.) alleged that a black man entered her bedroom. (Note: Accounts differ as to if this occurred at the home of the woman's parents, or at the home of the woman and her husband.) Awakened by him, she screamed, which caused him to flee. Within days, Forsyth County Sheriff William Reid detained Toney Howell as a suspect, along with alleged accomplices Johnny Bates, Fate Chester, Isaiah Pirkle, and Joe Rogers. The five black men were placed in the small Forsyth County jail located near the Cumming town square.

=== Assault on Grant Smith ===
After the news came out about the attack on Grice, Grant Smith, a black preacher at a local Cumming church, was heard to suggest that the victim was a "sorry white woman". Outraged whites horse-whipped the preacher until law officers rescued him and took him inside the courthouse. Guards were stationed to protect Smith from further violence; they prevented the courthouse from being stormed. Smith was later transferred out of town for his safety. No one was ever arrested or tried for the assault on Smith.

=== Whites patrol streets ===
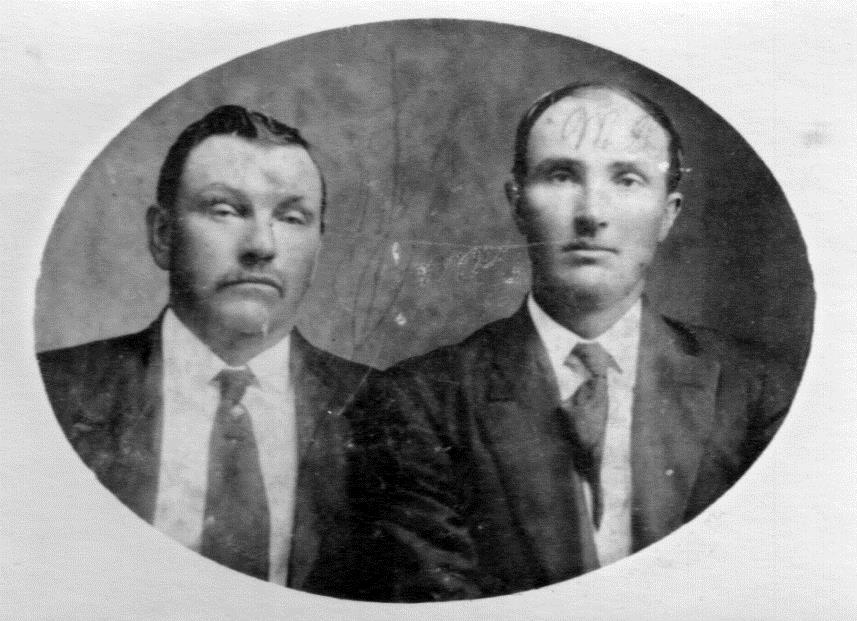
Sheriff Bill Reid and Deputy Sheriff Mitchell Gay Lummus, c. 1912

Based on rumors that blacks at a nearby church barbecue threatened to dynamite the town, armed white men patrolled Cumming to prevent such action. Fearing a race riot, Governor Joseph Mackey Brown declared martial law and activated 23 members of the National Guard from Gainesville, who successfully kept the peace along with other Guard members from Marietta.

Later that day, Sheriff Reid sent Howell, his four alleged accomplices, and Smith to the Cobb County jail in nearby Marietta for their safety. Smith, who was not under arrest, was released there. Fearing that a mob from Cumming was en route, Governor Brown arranged for the five prisoners to be moved again for their protection, this time to the Fulton County jail in Atlanta. No mob formed in Marietta.

=== Toney Howell charges ===
Police said that Toney Howell had confessed to the assault on Ellen Grice. Charged with assault with intent to rape, a grand jury quietly dropped the case in February 1913 and he was never tried.

== Mae Crow assault ==
On September 8, 1912, Mae Crow, (Note: Contemporary newspaper reports gave her name as May Crow; a 1987 recap of events gave her name as Slutie Mae Crow; other sources state Sleety Mae Crow.) a white girl aged 18, went missing near Cumming. She was walking from home to her aunt's house nearby on Browns Bridge Road along the Forsyth-Hall county line. The next day, searchers found the missing girl at noon, in secluded woods about one mile (1.6 km) from her house. She was lying face down in a pool of blood and her throat had been slashed; she was still alive and breathing shallowly. Crow later died of her injuries. (Note: Contemporary newspaper reports said she died on September 9; other sources state September 23.)

=== Arrest of Ernest Knox ===
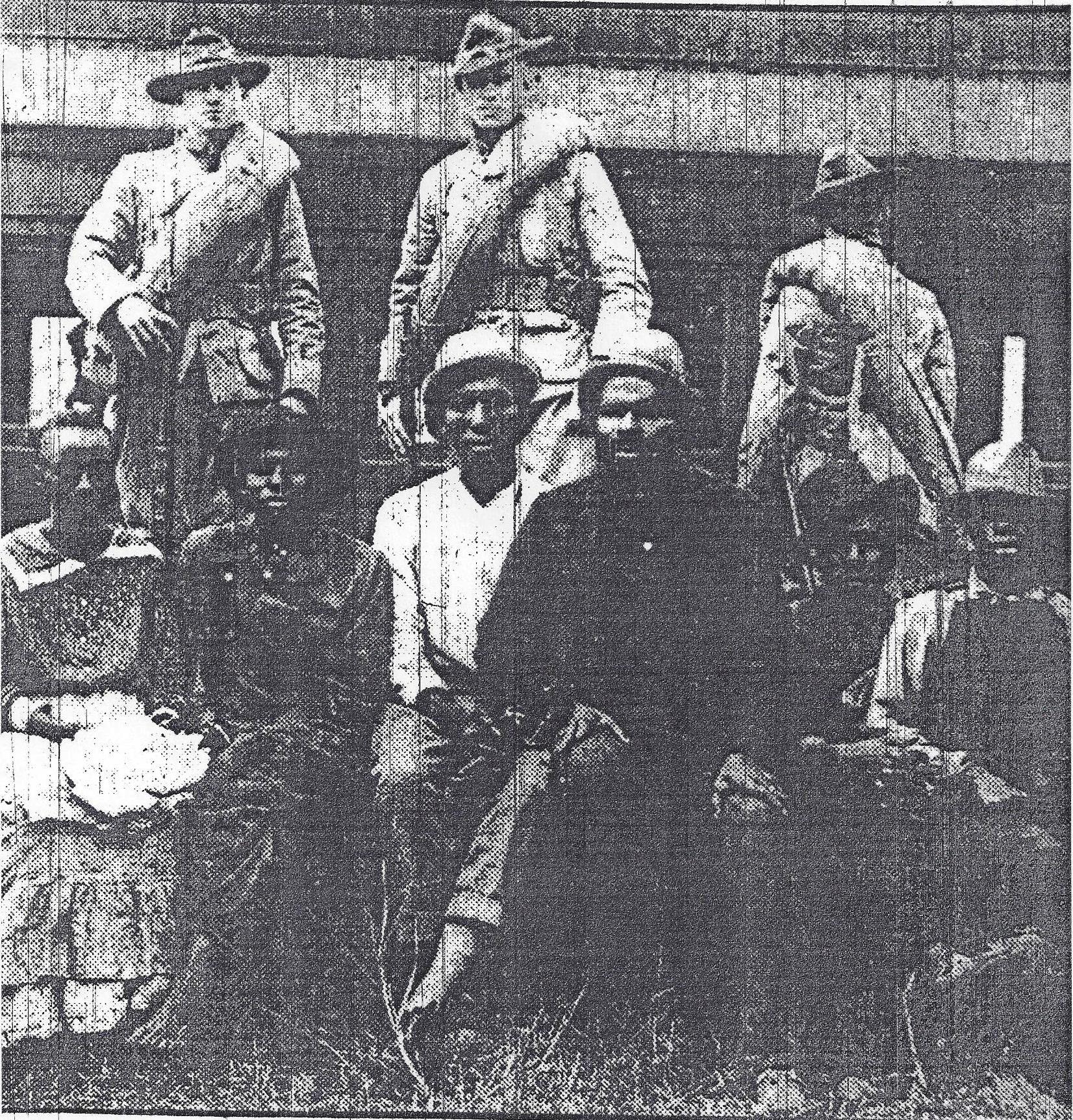
Photo taken October 2, 1912. Although not identified by the newspaper, they are believed to be: (left to right) Trussie "Jane" Daniel, Oscar Daniel, Tony Howell (accused of Ellen Grice assault), Ed Collins (witness), Isaiah Pirkle (witness for Howell), and Ernest Knox.

At the scene where the girl was found, searchers found a small pocket mirror that was said to belong to Ernest Knox, (Note: Contemporary newspaper reports initially gave his name as Ernest Cox.) a 16-year-old black boy. Police arrested him at home, taking him to the Hall County jail in Gainesville to avoid the recent turmoil of Cumming. On the way, Knox confessed to having attacked Crow, after being subjected to a "form of torture known as mock lynching."

Knox was said to have struck Crow from behind and dragged her down a gully in the woods. He allegedly assaulted the girl with a rock and raped her. Around midnight that day, Knox returned to the scene with three acquaintances: Oscar Daniel, 17; Oscar's sister Trussie "Jane" Daniel, 22; and Jane's live-in boyfriend Rob Edwards, 24. The men reportedly "satisfied their lustful passions" on the girl.

When word spread of the attack on Crow, a white lynch mob began to form that afternoon at the Gainesville jail. That night, police officers took Knox by car to Atlanta to prevent a lynching.

=== Rob Edwards lynched ===
Rob Edwards was arrested the next day as a suspect in Crow's attack and was taken to the county jail in Cumming. Sheriff Reid then left, leaving his deputy to protect the jail and its prisoner. Later that day, a lynch mob attacked the county jail; some men gained entry, dragged Edwards from his cell, and hanged him from a telephone pole in the town square; he may have been shot to death before being hanged. The Atlanta Georgian reported that "the corpse was mangled into something hardly resembling a human form."

=== Trial ===
Trussie Daniel and her brother Oscar Daniel were also arrested as suspects, and their neighbor Ed Collins was held as a witness. (Note: Collins testified at trial that he loaned Knox and Edwards a lantern on the night in question.) For the trial, held in early October in Cumming, the governor again declared martial law. At the trial, Trussie Daniel testified as a witness for the prosecution and recounted the midnight attack on the victim by the men. Ernest Knox and Oscar Daniel were quickly convicted of rape and murder, by an all-white jury of 11 farmers and one night watchman.

The following day, October 4, both teenagers were sentenced to death by hanging, scheduled for October 25. State law prohibited public hangings. The scheduled execution was to be viewed only by the victim's family, a minister, and law officers. Gallows were built off the square in Cumming. A fence erected around the gallows was burned down the night before the execution. A crowd estimated at between 5,000 and 8,000 gathered to watch what became a public hanging of the two youths. The total county population was around 12,000 at the time.

Prior to mounting the scaffold, Daniel maintained his innocence, but Knox confessed.

== Aftermath: racial expulsion ==
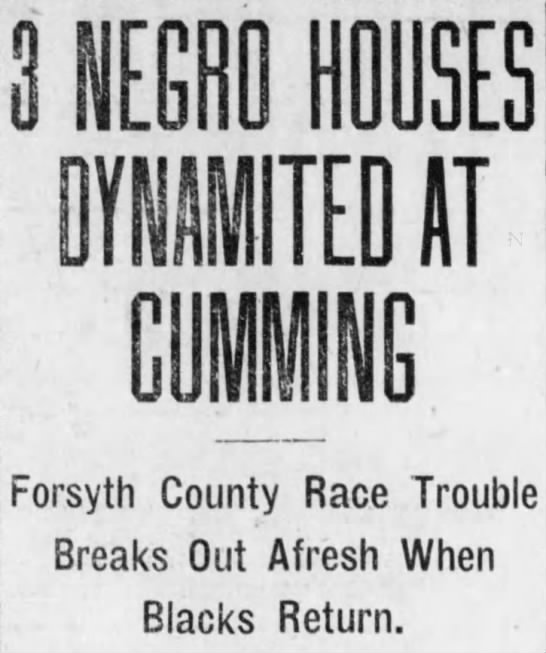
Headline in The Atlanta Georgian of February 19, 1913

After the trial and executions, bands of white men known as Night Riders, from Cherokee County and other nearby counties, threatened and intimidated black inhabitants. These families either fled or were killed and their properties were stolen from them. Those that left fled to Hall County and Gwinnett County. In 1910, more than 1,000 black people lived in the county, which had more than 10,000 white residents. Within the next four months following the events of September 1912, an estimated 98% of the black residents living in the county left due to Night Rider threats, or were murdered.

Some property owners were able to sell, likely at a loss. The renters and sharecroppers left to seek safer places. Those who had to abandon property, and failed to continue paying property tax, eventually lost their lands, and whites took it over. Many black properties ended up in white hands without a sale and without a legal transfer of title. Much of this land was in the village of Oscarville, Georgia. Eventually, the village was submerged under the waters of Lake Lanier.

Night Riders next moved on to Dawson County and Hall County where they attempted to do the same. Reportedly, a few white residents tried to stop the Night Riders, but were unsuccessful. They were finally stopped when the Hall County sheriff arrested 11 of the Night Riders.

This anti-black campaign was widespread across Appalachian Georgia, with Forsyth being the third county to expel its black population after Towns and Union, whilst whites soon afterwards expelled blacks from the surrounding counties of Fannin, Gilmer and Dawson.

== Representation in other media ==
The racial expulsion, or ethnic cleansing, of Forsyth County was among the events explored in Banished: American Ethnic Cleansings, aired on PBS in 2015 in its Independent Lens series.

The 2016 non-fiction book by author Patrick Phillips, Blood at the Root: A Racial Cleansing In America, examines the 1912 events in Forsyth County along with later events including the 1987 Forsyth County protests. Phillips said in an interview with Terry Gross that he first heard of the racial cleansing when he moved to the county with his parents at age seven.

In 2020, soil from the site where Rob Edwards was lynched was donated to The Legacy Museum in Montgomery, Alabama, for display with soil from other lynching sites across the United States.

In January 2021, a historical marker documenting the lynching of Rob Edwards was unveiled in downtown Cumming.

== See also ==
African Americans

- Black genocide, the notion that African Americans have been subjected to genocide
- List of ethnic cleansing campaigns
- List of ethnic riots#United States
- List of expulsions of African Americans, incidents similar to the Forsyth expulsion
- List of massacres in the United States
- Racism against African Americans

Georgia

- African Americans in Georgia
- Demographics of Georgia (U.S. state)

United States

- Lynching in the United States
  - False accusation of rape#Justification for lynchings
- Racism in the United States
  - Mass racial violence in the United States
  - Nadir of American race relations
- Terrorism in the United States
  - Domestic terrorism in the United States
- Whitecapping
