= List of expulsions of African Americans =

African Americans have been violently expelled from at least 50 towns, cities, and counties in the United States. Most of these expulsions occurred in the 60 years following the American Civil War but continued until 1954. The justifications for the expulsions varied but often involved a crime allegedly committed by Black Americans, labor-related issues, or property takeovers.

== Timeline ==
=== 19th century ===
Date	Location	Notes
1831	Portsmouth, Ohio	All 80 Black residents were expelled under Ohio's discriminatory "Black Laws."
1870s - 1940s	Wyandotte, Michigan	African Americans were expelled from Wyandotte on multiple occasions.
April 13, 1873	Pollock, Louisiana	Further information: Colfax massacre The small Black population of Pollock left the town after the massacre of more than 100 Black citizens in nearby Colfax.
November 1, 1878	Celina, Tennessee	Celina's Black population left on November 1, 1878, after being subject to a series of violent actions over the course of several months.
1886	Comanche County, Texas	White residents expelled the Black population from Comanche County because of alleged crimes committed by Black men.
1888–1908	Paragould, Arkansas	A number of race riots occurred in Paragould between 1888 and 1908, resulting in most of the town's 150 Black residents leaving.
1892	Lexington, Oklahoma	Black residents were expelled in 1892.
1893	Blackwell, Oklahoma	Black residents were expelled, and Blackwell became a sundown town.
June 20, 1894	Monett, Missouri	Monett's Black population was expelled after the lynching of a Black man who killed a white man during a fight. The Monett expulsion was the first of number of violent expulsions in Southwestern Missouri between 1894 and 1906.
1896	Linton, Indiana	300 Black strikebreakers were expelled from the coal mining town of Linton after one of the strikebreakers shot a white boy. Eventually Black Americans were banned from living in all of Greene County.
August 27, 1897	Elwood, Indiana	
November 10, 1898	Wilmington, North Carolina	Further information: Wilmington massacre A coup d'état and a massacre which was carried out by white supremacists in Wilmington, North Carolina, United States, on Thursday, November 10, 1898. The white press in Wilmington originally described the event as a race riot caused by Black residents. Since the late 20th century and further study, the event has been characterized as a violent overthrow of a duly elected government by a group of white supremacists. The number of Black people killed by the mob by the end of the day (November 10) is uncertain. Estimates have included "about 20", "more than twenty", "twenty or more", "somewhere between fourteen and sixty", "as many as 60", "at least sixty", "90", "more than one hundred", and "exceeded 300". An additional number, variously estimated between 20 and 50, were banished and ordered to leave town by the mob. Along with Alex and Frank G. Manly, brothers who had owned the Daily Record (one of the few Black newspapers in the state and reportedly the only Black daily newspaper in the country), more than 2,000 Black Americans left Wilmington permanently, forced to abandon their businesses and properties. This greatly reduced the city's professional and artisan class, and changed the formerly Black-majority city into one with a white majority.
April 10, 1899	Pana, Illinois	Further information: Pana riot Gun battle between striking white miners and strikebreaker Black miners results in the deaths of five Black residents and two whites as well as the expulsion of Pana's Black population.
September 17, 1899	Carterville, Illinois	A violent shootout occurred between striking white miners and non-union Black miners who were brought into Carterville as strikebreakers. Five Black miners are killed. All the surviving Black miners left Carterville shortly after the riot.

=== 20th century ===
Date	Location	Notes
February 20, 1901	Mena, Arkansas	Most of Mena's Black population left the town after a Black man named Peter Berryman was lynched for allegedly assaulting a white girl.
August 18, 1901	Pierce City, Missouri	Further information: Pierce City, Missouri § 1901 lynchings and expulsion 300 Black residents were expelled after white residents lynched three Black men for allegedly killing a white woman.
June 1902	Decatur, Indiana	A mob of 50 men forced Black residents out of Decatur.
April 16, 1903	Joplin, Missouri	White residents drove out Joplin's Black residents following the lynching of a Black transient for the murder of a white policeman.
July 9, 1903	Sour Lake, Texas	A mob of 500 white men opened fire on Black residents and chased them out of Sour Lake after a brakeman was shot dead by a Black man.
October 1905 and January 1909	Harrison, Arkansas	Race riots in 1905 and 1909 resulted in the expulsion of Harrison's Black residents.
August 24, 1906	Cotter, Arkansas	
1908	Marshall County, Kentucky	Whites led by a local doctor drove out Black residents from the now extinct city of Birmingham and most of the rest of Marshall County.
November 1909	Anna and Jonesboro, Illinois	Whites expelled Anna and Jonesboro's 40 Black families after the lynching of William "Froggie" James in nearby Cairo.
September 1912	Forsyth County, Georgia	Further information: 1912 Racial Conflict of Forsyth County, Georgia 98% of Forsyth County's 1,000 Black residents were expelled after two alleged attacks on white women allegedly committed by Black men.
July 1917	East St. Louis, Illinois	Further information: East St. Louis massacre The East St. Louis massacre of late May and July 1–3, 1917, was an outbreak of labor- and race-related violence by whites that caused the death of 40–250 Black people and about $400,000 (over $8 million, in 2017 US dollars) in property damage. An estimated 6,000 Black people were left homeless.
May 1918	Erwin, Tennessee	A Black man was murdered and the entire remaining Black population of 131 residents was forced to witness his body being burned, after which they were ordered to leave their homes and were banished from the town; this incident is known as the Erwin Expulsion.
Fall 1919	Corbin, Kentucky	200 Black workers were forced to leave Corbin during a labor dispute.
November 2–3, 1920	Ocoee, Florida	Further information: Ocoee massacre Ocoee's Black community was burned to the ground and nearly all of its 500 residents killed or expelled by whites to prevent Black residents from voting and after false rumors of Black men killing two whites. At least 56 Black residents were killed during the massacre. Two white mob members were shot and killed in self-defense.
May 31, 1921	Tulsa, Oklahoma	Further information: Tulsa race massacre As many as 300 Black people were killed and 10,000 left homeless after whites attacked and destroyed the Greenwood district of Tulsa, known as "Black Wall Street".
1922	Jay, Florida	175 Black residents fled the town after a death of a white farmer who was shot by a Black farmer in self-defense.
January 1923	Rosewood, Florida	Further information: Rosewood massacre Whites attacked and burned down the Black Levy County town of Rosewood after a Black man allegedly raped a white woman. At least 6 and perhaps as many as 150 Black people were killed. Two white mob members were shot and killed in self-defense.
1923	Blanford, Indiana	Ku Klux Klan-led expulsion.
January 3, 1924	Manhattan Beach, California	The Manhattan Beach City Council passed ordinance 263, claiming eminent domain for a public park, in order to take properties owned by Black residents and eliminate the African American resort, Bruce's Beach.
1954	Vienna, Illinois	White residents burned down all the Black homes of Vienna and nearby areas outside city limits. The expulsion was sparked by the murder of an elderly white woman and the attempted rape of her teenage granddaughter by two Black men.
1954	Sheridan, Arkansas	Following the Brown v. Board of Education decision, and a reversed decision of the school board to integrate the schools, local sawmill owner Jack Williams threatened to burn down the homes of all his Black employees unless they accepted a buyout offer and relocated to Malvern.

== See also ==
- Expelled Because of Color, a monument to African Americans expelled from the Georgia Legislature
- Sundown town, a town that excludes African Americans from living in it. Many towns went sundown after expelling black populations though most sundown towns did not have significant black populations to begin with. A partial listing is available at List of sundown towns in the United States.
