= Corbin, Kentucky race riot of 1919 =

American race riot

- Part of Red Summer
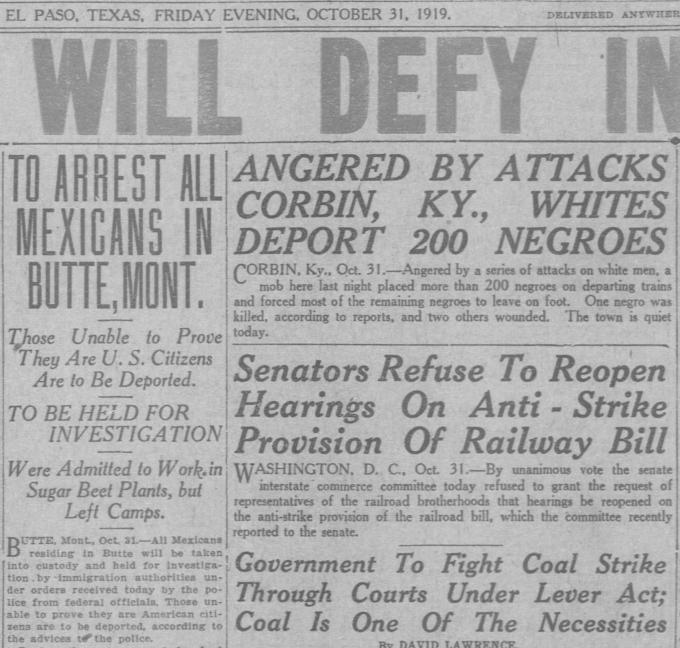
- News Coverage of the Expulsion
- Date: October 31, 1919
- Location: Corbin, Kentucky, United States
- Deaths: 1
- Injuries: 2

The Corbin, Kentucky race riot of 1919 was a race riot in 1919 in which a white mob forced nearly all of Corbin's 200 black residents onto a freight train out of town.

== Corbin Expulsion ==
On October 29, 1919, two men robbed and stabbed A.F. Thompson before escaping without him getting a good look. Thompson was able to stumble to a nearby house and get help. Word quickly spread about the crime and that the attackers were two black men. On October 31, 1919, an enraged and armed white mob made up of hundreds of Corbin's townspeople organized and went house-to-house rounding up black residents. When they felt that all of the African-Americans of the town had been gathered, the mob marched a group of approximately 200 men, women, and children to the train station, and herded them onto cramped railcars. The train departed with its human cargo and were sent south to the town Knoxville. "They swore at us and said: 'By God we are going to run all Negroes out of this town tonight,'" said longtime black Corbin resident John Turner in a signed affidavit about the incident.

== Aftermath ==
This uprising was one of several incidents of civil unrest that began with the American Red Summer, in April 1919 - terrorist attacks on black communities and white oppression in over three dozen cities and counties. In most cases, white mobs attacked African-American neighborhoods. In some cases, black community groups resisted the attacks, especially in Chicago and Washington DC; however, more deaths occurred in rural areas during events like the Elaine massacre in Arkansas, where an estimated 100 to 240 black people were killed. Also, in 1919, were the Chicago Race Riot and Washington D.C. race riot in which 38 and 39 people (respectively) were killed. Both events also had many more non-fatal injuries and extensive property damage reaching up into the millions of dollars.

== Corbin, Kentucky race riot in media ==
Trouble Behind (1991), a documentary by Robby Henson, examines the history and legacy of racism in Corbin, Kentucky, a small railroad community noteworthy both as the home of Colonel Sanders' Kentucky Fried Chicken and for "its race riots of 1919, during which over two hundred blacks were loaded onto boxcars and shipped out of town." The film aired at the 1991 Sundance Film Festival and was nominated for the Grand Jury Prize.

== See also ==
- List of expulsions of African Americans
- Sundown town
- Mass racial violence in the United States
- List of incidents of civil unrest in the United States

== Bibliography ==
Notes

References

- Griggs, Kristy Owens (Summer 2002). "The Removal of Blacks from Corbin in 1919: Memory, Perspective, and the Legacy of Racism". The Register of the Kentucky Historical Society. 100 (3). Kentucky Historical Society: 293–310. ISSN 0023-0243. JSTOR 23384408. OCLC 2263214.
- McWhirter, Cameron (2011). Red Summer: The Summer of 1919 and the Awakening of Black America. Henry Holt and Company. ISBN 9781429972932. - Total pages: 368
- The New York Times (October 5, 1919). "For Action on Race Riot Peril". The New York Times. New York, NY. ISSN 1553-8095. OCLC 1645522.
- NPR (March 10, 2007). "Kentucky Town Re-Examines Its Racial History". NPR.
- Sundance Group (2019). "Archives 1991 Sundance Film Festival: Trouble Behind". Sundance Group.
- Rucker, Walter C.; Upton, James N. (2007). Encyclopedia of American Race Riots, Volume 2. Greenwood Publishing Group. ISBN 9780313333026. - Total pages: 930
- Voogd, Jan (2008). Race Riots and Resistance: The Red Summer of 1919. Peter Lang. ISBN 9781433100673. - Total pages: 234
