= Centralia, Oklahoma =

Unincorporated Community in Oklahoma, United States

Coordinates: 36.79675°N 95.353305°W

Centralia is an unincorporated community in Craig County, Oklahoma, United States. It is located northwest of Vinita and is situated on no major highways, being on E 153 Rd between S 4290 Rd and S 4300 Rd.

== History ==
It is said to have been founded by J. H. Hargrove in 1898 and named for Centralia, Missouri. The town prospered between 1907 and 1915, before entering a long decline. According to a 1901 article from the Kingfisher Free Press, Centralia was once dominated by its Black population. A raid on a Black household commenced after reported shootings at other residents, after which the article reads, "No negroes are allowed to live in the vicinity of Centralia."

The post office opened April 11, 1899, with Hargrove as the first postmaster. Several businesses opened during the next couple of years. Most of them were housed in wooden buildings that had been constructed around a town square. Most of the business district was destroyed by a fire on January 11, 1907. Another fire on July 22, 1917, destroyed about one-third of the district.

== Demographics ==
By 1915, the population peaked at 750 residents. Two banks functioned in the town, until both failed circa 1929. A combination of the fires, the Great Depression and the failure of the proposed railroad from Vinita to Coffeyville resulted in the large-scale abandonment of Centralia. The 1980 census recorded 43 residents. By 2010, only seven or eight inhabitants remained in ZIP Code 74301.

== See also ==
- List of sundown towns in the United States
