= Crescent Springs, Kentucky =

- City
- Location of Crescent Springs in Kenton County, Kentucky.
- Coordinates: 39°03′19″N 84°34′44″W
- Country: United States
- State: Kentucky
- County: Kenton

Government
  - Mayor: Mike Daugherty

Area
  - Total: 1.51 sq mi (3.92 km^{2})
  - Land: 1.49 sq mi (3.87 km^{2})
  - Water: 0.019 sq mi (0.05 km^{2})
- Elevation: 804 ft (245 m)

Population (2020)
  - Total: 4,319
  - Estimate (2024): 4,707
  - Density: 2,890.3/sq mi (1,115.97/km^{2})
- Time zone: UTC-5 (Eastern (EST))
  - Summer (DST): UTC-4 (EDT)
- ZIP code: 41017
- Area code: 859
- FIPS code: 21-18352
- GNIS feature ID: 2404151
- Website: crescent-springs.ky.us

Crescent Springs is a home rule-class city in Kenton County, Kentucky, United States. The population was 4,319 at the 2020 census.

== Geography ==
According to the United States Census Bureau, the city has a total area of 1.4 square miles (3.6 km^{2}), all land.

== History ==
Originally a stop on the Cincinnati Southern Railroad, the name Crescent Springs could refer to either the shape of the tracks crossing through the community or to New Orleans's nickname "the Crescent City" after its shape beside the Mississippi River. (New Orleans was the southern terminus of the Cincinnati Southern, from which it was sometimes known as the "Queen and Crescent Railroad".)

In 1930, the International Labor Defense alleged that Crescent Springs was a sundown town where African Americans were not allowed to reside.

== Demographics ==
Historical population
Census	Pop.	Note	%±
1960	946		—
1970	1,662		75.7%
1980	1,944		17.0%
1990	2,179		12.1%
2000	3,931		80.4%
2010	3,801		−3.3%
2020	4,319		13.6%
2024 (est.)	4,707		9.0%
U.S. Decennial Census

=== 2020 census ===
As of the 2020 census, Crescent Springs had a population of 4,319. The median age was 35.0 years. 25.7% of residents were under the age of 18 and 13.8% of residents were 65 years of age or older. For every 100 females there were 98.0 males, and for every 100 females age 18 and over there were 97.5 males age 18 and over.

100.0% of residents lived in urban areas, while 0.0% lived in rural areas.

There were 1,759 households in Crescent Springs, of which 34.5% had children under the age of 18 living in them. Of all households, 43.2% were married-couple households, 20.4% were households with a male householder and no spouse or partner present, and 28.7% were households with a female householder and no spouse or partner present. About 29.8% of all households were made up of individuals and 11.1% had someone living alone who was 65 years of age or older.

There were 1,867 housing units, of which 5.8% were vacant. The homeowner vacancy rate was 1.4% and the rental vacancy rate was 5.3%.

Racial composition as of the 2020 census
Race	Number	Percent
White	3,475	80.5%
Black or African American	200	4.6%
American Indian and Alaska Native	5	0.1%
Asian	185	4.3%
Native Hawaiian and Other Pacific Islander	33	0.8%
Some other race	146	3.4%
Two or more races	275	6.4%
Hispanic or Latino (of any race)	242	5.6%

=== 2000 census ===
As of the 2000 census, there were 3,931 people, 1,638 households, and 1,020 families residing in the city. The population density was 2,741.3 inhabitants per square mile (1,058.4/km^{2}). There were 1,760 housing units at an average density of 1,227.3 per square mile (473.9/km^{2}). The racial makeup of the city was 95.80% White, 1.37% African American, 0.05% Native American, 1.78% Asian, 0.03% Pacific Islander, 0.13% from other races, and 0.84% from two or more races. Hispanic or Latino of any race were 0.89% of the population.

There were 1,638 households, out of which 33.5% had children under the age of 18 living with them, 44.6% were married couples living together, 12.6% had a female householder with no husband present, and 37.7% were non-families. 29.9% of all households were made up of individuals, and 7.6% had someone living alone who was 65 years of age or older. The average household size was 2.40 and the average family size was 3.00.

In the city, the population was spread out, with 26.4% under the age of 18, 10.1% from 18 to 24, 34.7% from 25 to 44, 20.0% from 45 to 64, and 8.8% who were 65 years of age or older. The median age was 32 years. For every 100 females, there were 94.3 males. For every 100 females age 18 and over, there were 91.2 males.

The median income for a household in the city was $41,429, and the median income for a family was $50,573. Males had a median income of $42,500 versus $30,708 for females. The per capita income for the city was $24,891. About 5.2% of families and 7.1% of the population were below the poverty line, including 7.8% of those under age 18 and 2.6% of those age 65 or over.

== See also ==
- List of sundown towns in the United States
