= Blood at the Root =

2016 book by Patrick Phillips

- Author: Patrick Phillips
- Language: English
- Genre: Non-fiction, history, race and ethnicity in the United States
- Published: 2016
- Publisher: W. W. Norton & Company
- Publication place: United States
- Pages: 302
- ISBN: 978-0-393-29301-2

Blood at the Root: A Racial Cleansing in America is a 2016 non-fiction book written by Patrick Phillips investigating the 1912 racial conflict in Forsyth County, Georgia, the ensuing racial cleansing of the county, and later developments including the 1987 Forsyth County protests.

== Overview ==
In September 1912 in Forsyth County, Georgia, a young white girl was assaulted, raped, and later died. Following the coerced confession of a young black man, an alleged accomplice was lynched. What then followed was bands of white "night riders" (Note: The Ku Klux Klan had disbanded in the early 1870s and did not re-form until 1915.) that drove the black citizens out of the county, via arson and terror. The title Blood at the Root comes from the song Strange Fruit about the lynchings of African Americans in the South.

== Reviews ==
Carol Anderson, reviewing the book for The New York Times, said it "meticulously and elegantly reveals the power of white supremacy in its many guises." Anderson commented that some of the book was "weighed down by supposition and tangents", noting that the author "is hampered by the scarce records, biased contemporary newspaper reporting, traumatized family memories and oral histories that are few and far between."
