= A. James Rudin =

American rabbi (born c.1934)

A. James Rudin (born c. 1934) is an American rabbi noted for his work in inter-religious affairs.

== Life ==
He was born in Pittsburgh, Pennsylvania. He is a 1955 graduate of George Washington university Rudin was ordained by the Hebrew Union College-Jewish Institute of Religion in 1960.

He joined the staff of the American Jewish Committee in 1968 and served for many years as its National Inter-religious Affairs Director. In that time, he met Pope John Paul II twelve times. He retired from the AJC in 2000.

In January 1987, Rudin was one of several civil rights activists who participated in a large march through Forsyth County, Georgia, as part of civil rights protests in the area.

He was appointed distinguished visiting professor of religion and Judaica at Saint Leo University in 2002.

== Awards ==
- "Person of Reconciliation" Award from the Polish Council of Christians and Jews in Warsaw, 1997
- Joseph Award given by the Villa Nazareth, a Pontifical Institution, 1997
- International Council of Christians and Jews awarded him its Interfaith Medallion, 1999
- Eternal Light Award, St. Leo University, 2007

== Personal life ==
Rudin has two daughters. His younger daughter, Jennifer Rudin (c. 1972), is a casting director and author. She has worked on many major motion pictures, including several animated features, and is the author of Confessions of a Casting Director (HarperCollins 2013).

After retirement, he and his wife moved to Florida.
