= Tyler Bridges =

American freelance reporter

- Born: Palo Alto, California
- Education: Stanford University
- Occupation: Journalist

Tyler Bridges is an American reporter for The Times-Picayune/The New Orleans Advocate who has contributed to The Washington Post, Politico, and other publications. He was previously a reporter for The Lens (a non-profit digital newsroom based in New Orleans), The Miami Herald, and The Times-Picayune. Bridges has reported on New Orleans and Louisiana politics as well as on Latin American affairs.

== Early life and education ==
Bridges grew up in Palo Alto, California, and attended Palo Alto High School. In 1982, he graduated with a degree in political science from Stanford University, where he was a member of the Leland Stanford Junior University Marching Band.

== Career ==
From 1982 to 1984, Bridges was the editor of People & Taxes, a monthly newspaper published by Ralph Nader's Public Citizen. From 1984 to 1986, he was a reporter for The Daily Journal, the English-language newspaper in Caracas, Venezuela.

From 1986 to 1989, he was a freelance journalist in South America, reporting from various countries. From 1989 to 1996, Bridges was a reporter for The Times-Picayune of New Orleans. His coverage of David Duke, the former Ku Klux Klan grand wizard who at the time was in the process of briefly gaining political office in Louisiana, resulted in Bridges's first book, The Rise of David Duke, published in 1994.

Between 1992 and 1996, Bridges also covered the legalization of gambling in Louisiana. This became the subject of his next book, Bad Bet on the Bayou: The Rise of Gambling in Louisiana and The Fall of Governor Edwin Edwards.

After leaving the Times-Picayune, Bridges went to work for the Miami Herald, for which he served as chief political correspondent, based in Miami, and as a reporter on the Florida state government, based in Tallahassee.

In 2011–2012, Bridges spent a year at Harvard University on a Nieman Fellowship, studying the coverage of politics and government in digital media.

On September 19, 2012, Bridges became a staff writer for The Lens, a digital news site in New Orleans.

Writing for Politico in November 2016, Bridges recounted his experience watching former Ku Klux Klan grand wizard David Duke in his race for New Orleans Senate seat of retiring U.S. Senator David Vitter in 2016. Bridges sat in on the statewide television debate held at the historically black college, Dillard University.

== Personal life ==
From 2008 to 2019, Bridges was married to Cecilia Tait, who was a prominent member of the silver medal-winning Peruvian women's volleyball team at the 1988 Olympics in Seoul. She was known as "the golden left arm." Bridges and Tait were a couple for eight years and had a daughter together, Luciana, before marrying on September 14, 2008. Tait also has another daughter, Laura from a previous relationship. Bridges and Tait divorced in 2019.
