= Howell, Evansville =

Neighborhood in Evansville, Indiana, United States

Coordinates: 37°57′34″N 87°36′55″W

Howell is a neighborhood of Evansville, Indiana, United States.

== History ==
The town of Howell was platted in 1885 along the Louisville and Nashville Railroad and was named after Lee Howell, the local L&N freight agent. An L&N rail yard at Howell was completed in 1889. Most residents worked for the L&N. As of 1904, the town was a sundown town, where African Americans were not allowed to live. In 1915 or 1916, Evansville annexed Howell.

== See also ==
- History of Evansville, Indiana
- List of sundown towns in the United States
