= Dave Holland (Klansman) =

David W. Holland (born c.1955) is the founder and Grand Dragon of the Southern White Knights of the Ku Klux Klan.

He was among those ordered to pay restitution for organizing a demonstration that became a violent attack against a civil rights march on January 17, 1987. The Supreme Court upheld the decision.
