= Patrick Phillips =

American poet, writer, and professor

- Occupations: Poet, writer, professor
- Writing career
- Language: English
- Notable work: Blood at the Root

Patrick Phillips is an American poet, writer, and professor. He teaches writing and literature at Stanford University, and is a Carnegie Foundation Fellow and a fellow of the Cullman Center for Writers at the New York Public Library. He has been a Fulbright Scholar at the University of Copenhagen, and previously taught writing and literature at Drew University. He grew up in Georgia and now lives in San Francisco.

== Works ==
Phillips' 2015 poetry collection, Elegy for a Broken Machine (Alfred A. Knopf), was a finalist for the National Book Award for Poetry. His poems have appeared in many magazines, including Poetry, Ploughshares, The American Poetry Review, Harvard Review, DoubleTake, New England Review, and Virginia Quarterly Review, and have been featured on Garrison Keillor's show The Writer's Almanac on National Public Radio.

Phillips' 2016 non-fiction book Blood at the Root: A Racial Cleansing in America was named a best book of the year by The Boston Globe, The New York Times, and Smithsonian magazine.

Phillips has also served as a faculty member for the annual Conference on Poetry at The Frost Place in New Hampshire.

== Honors and awards ==
- 2010 Guggenheim Fellowship
- 2009 National Endowment for the Arts Fellowship in Poetry
- 2008 Translation Prize of the American-Scandinavian Foundation
- 2005 Kate Tufts Discovery Award, for Chattahoochee
- 2004 Bread Loaf Writers' Conference Fellowship
- 2003 "Discovery" / The Nation Award, Unterberg Poetry Center of the 92nd Street Y
- 2001 Sjoberg Translation Prize of the American-Scandinavian Foundation, for translations of the Danish poet Henrik Nordbrandt
- 2000 Fulbright Fellowship in Literary Translation, University of Copenhagen

== Published works ==
- Chattahoochee. University of Arkansas Press. 2004. ISBN 978-1-55728-775-5.
- Boy. University of Georgia Press. 2008. ISBN 978-0-8203-3119-5.
- Elegy for a Broken Machine. Alfred A. Knopf. 2015. ISBN 978-0385353755.
- Blood at the Root: A Racial Cleansing in America. W. W. Norton & Company. 2016. ISBN 978-0-393-29301-2.
