= Georgia State Route 347 =

Highway in Georgia, United States

State Route 347
- SR 347 highlighted in red

Route information
- Maintained by GDOT
- Length: 12.3 mi (19.8 km)
- Existed: 1963–present

Major junctions
- West end: Lake Lanier Islands north of Buford
- SR 13 in Buford; I-985 / US 23 / SR 365 in Buford
- East end: SR 211 in Braselton

Location
- Country: United States
- State: Georgia
- Counties: Hall

Highway system
- Georgia State Highway System; Interstate; US; State; Special
← SR 346	→ SR 348

State Route 347 (SR 347) is a west-to-east state highway in the northeastern part of the U.S. state of Georgia. It travels from the Lake Lanier Islands north of Buford to a point on the northern edge of Braselton. Its routing is entirely within Hall County. The highway connects the Lake Lanier Islands with Buford and Braselton.

As the Atlanta metropolitan area has grown over the past few years, SR 347 has undergone strain from an influx of new subdivisions and housing developments, especially during morning and evening rush hours. SR 347 also serves as an important connector to the Lake Lanier Islands and the southeast portion of Lake Lanier from Interstate 985 (I-985).

== Route description ==
SR 347 begins at the entrance to the Lake Lanier Islands beach and water park, along the southern part of Lake Lanier, in Hall County.

It travels to the southeast on Holiday Road and enters the northeastern part of Buford. There it has an intersection with SR 13 (Atlanta Highway). It then continues to the southeast on Friendship Road to an interchange with I-985/US 23/SR 365 (Lanier Parkway). Then, the highway leaves Buford and curves to the east-northeast on Thompson Mill Road. Its eastern terminus is at an intersection with SR 211 (Old Winder Highway) on the northern edge of Braselton.

SR 347 is not part of the National Highway System, a system of roadways important to the nation's economy, defense, and mobility.

== History ==
=== 1960s to 1990s ===
SR 347 was built between 1960 and 1963, but it only traveled from the Lake Lanier Islands area to an intersection with US 23/SR 13. I-985 had not been built in this area, so US 23 still traveled along surface streets. In 1968, it was extended to the under-construction freeway, which was then-proposed to be designated as SR 365. The roadway that would become the remainder of SR 347 was built at this time. The road remained virtually unchanged for nearly 30 years. In 1997, SR 347 was extended further east along Friendship and Thompson Mill Roads to SR 211 more than doubling the length of the highway.

=== Widening ===
Plans to widen Friendship Road (SR 347) began to appear in the late 1990s and early 2000s. In late 2012, the DOT began clearing and grading work to widening the road. The road widening would be handled in three sections. Section one would extend from I-985/US 23/SR 365 to the Lake Lanier Islands Beach and Water Park. Section two would extend from Thompson Mill Road to SR 211. Section three would connect the first and second sections.

=== Renaming controversy ===
In early 2013, the Hall County Board of Commissioners met to discuss eliminating the name "Friendship Road" and replacing it with the name "Lanier Islands Parkway." Château Élan Winery & Resort and the Town of Braselton both announced their displeasure with the potential name change. The residents who live on Friendship Road were angered as well, as the change represented, to them, county government bowing to business pressure from Lake Lanier Islands. The residents are also upset about losing yet another connection with the area's past, as the Friendship Community stretches back over 100 years, yet so much is being lost due to the road construction. Later, Hall County Board of Commissioners decided to keep it as Friendship Road within the Braselton Town Limits.

== Major intersections ==
The entire route is in Hall County.

Location	mi	km	Destinations	Notes
Lake Lanier Islands	0.0	0.0	Lanier Islands Parkway / Holiday Road	Western terminus
Buford	3.0	4.8	SR 13 (Atlanta Highway) – Atlanta, Gainesville	
Buford	3.9	6.3	I-985 (SR 419) / US 23 / SR 365 (Lanier Parkway)	I-985 exit 8
Braselton	12.3	19.8	SR 211 (Old Winder Highway) – Winder	Eastern terminus
1.000 mi = 1.609 km; 1.000 km = 0.621 mi
