= Cumming, Georgia =

- City
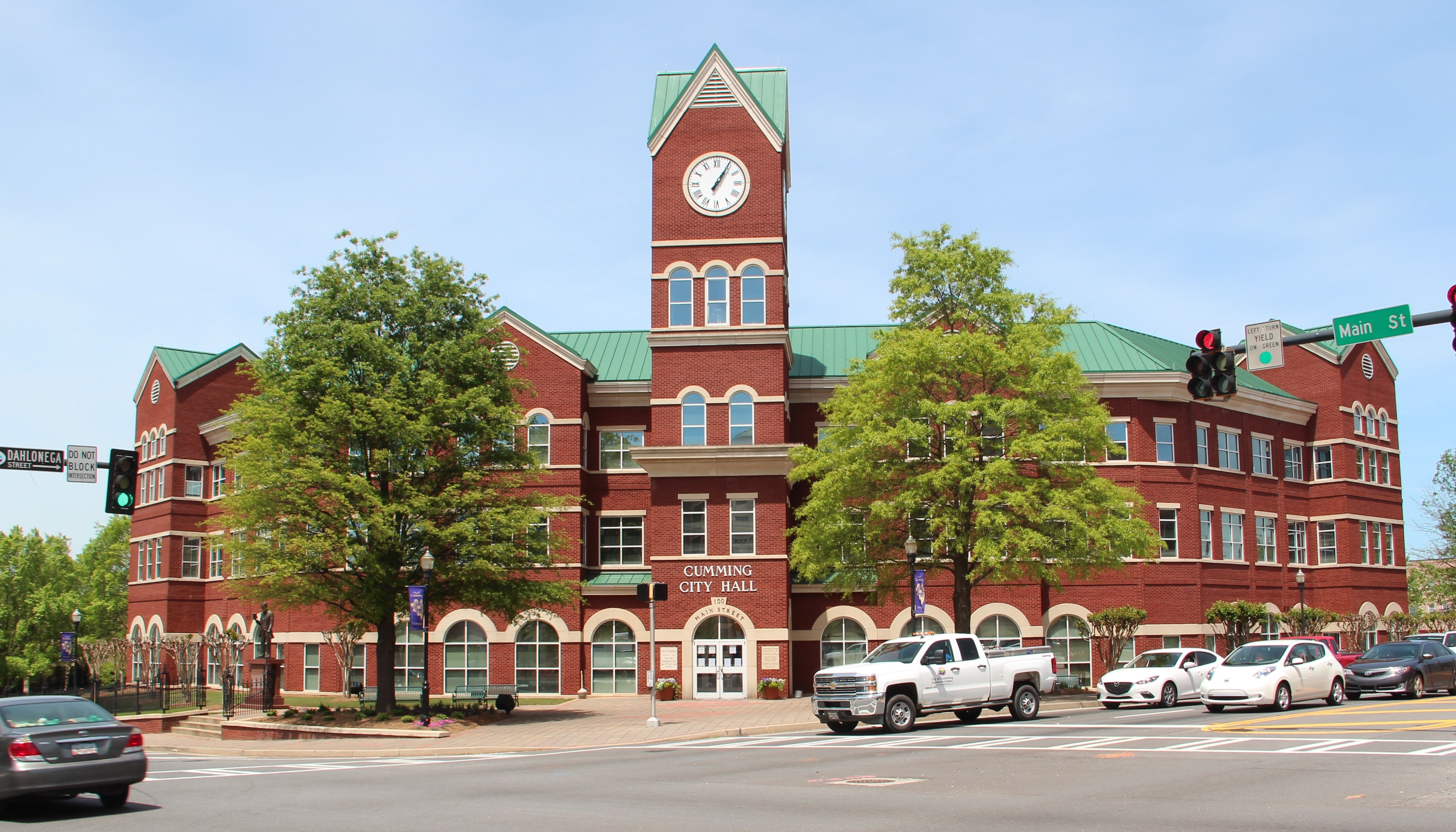
- Cumming City Hall

- Flag Seal
- Motto: Gateway to Leisure Living
- Interactive map of Cumming, Georgia
- Location within Georgia Location within the United States Location within Metro Atlanta
- Coordinates: 34°12′25″N 84°08′21″W
- Country: United States
- State: Georgia
- County: Forsyth
- Incorporated: 1834
- Chartered: 1845
- Named for: William Cumming

Government
  - Mayor: Troy Brumbalow (R)
  - Body: Cumming City Council

Area
  - Total: 7.23 sq mi (18.73 km^{2})
  - Land: 7.19 sq mi (18.62 km^{2})
  - Water: 0.039 sq mi (0.10 km^{2})
- Elevation: 1,217 ft (371 m)

Population (2020)
  - Total: 7,318
  - Density: 1,020/sq mi (393/km^{2})
- Time zone: UTC-5 (Eastern (EST))
  - Summer (DST): UTC-4 (EDT)
- ZIP Codes: 30028, 30040, 30041
- Area code: 770
- FIPS code: 13-20932
- GNIS feature ID: 0331494
- Website: www.cityofcumming.net

Cumming is a city and the county seat of Forsyth County, Georgia, United States, and the sole incorporated area in the county. It is a suburban city, and part of the Atlanta metropolitan area. In the 2020 census, the population is 7,318, up from 5,430 in 2010. Surrounding unincorporated areas with a Cumming mailing address have a population of approximately 100,000. The Cumming Census County Division had a population of 118,538 at the 2020 census.

== History ==
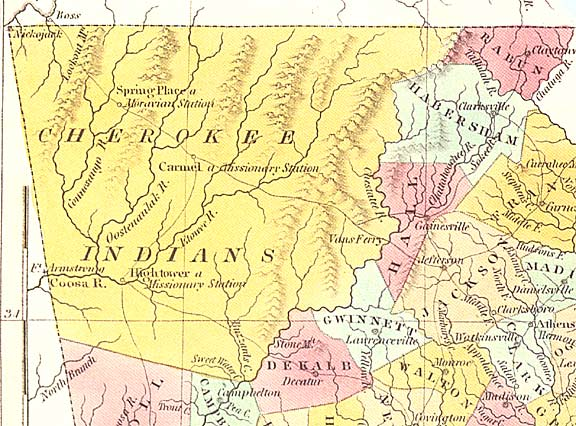
1830 map of Cherokee territory

The area now called Cumming is located west of the historic location of Vann's Ferry between Forsyth County and Hall County.

=== Early history ===
The area, now called Cumming, was inhabited earlier by Cherokee tribes, who are thought to have arrived in the mid-18th century. The Cherokee and Creek people developed disputes over hunting land. After two years of fighting, the Cherokee won the land in the Battle of Taliwa. The Creek people were forced to move south of the Chattahoochee River.

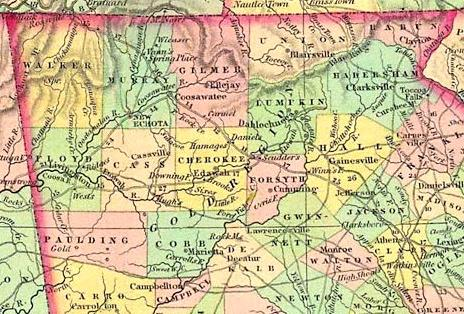
1834 map of counties that were created from Cherokee land. Cumming is shown in the middle of Forsyth County.

The Cherokee coexisted with white settlers until the discovery of gold in Georgia in 1828. Settlers that moved to the area to mine for gold pushed for the removal of the Cherokee. In 1835, the Treaty of New Echota was signed. The treaty stated that the Cherokee Nation must move to the Indian Territory, west of the Mississippi River. This resulted in the Trail of Tears. The Cherokee territory was then formed into Cherokee County in 1831. In 1832, the county had been split into several counties including Forsyth County.

In 1833, the town of Cumming was formed from two 40-acre (16 ha) land lots that had been issued as part of a Georgia State Land Lottery in 1832. The two lots designated as Land Lot 1269 and Land Lot 1270 were purchased by a couple of Forsyth County Inferior Court justices who realized that it was necessary to have a seat of government to conduct county business. The boundaries of the two lots ended at what is now Tolbert Street on the west side, Eastern Circle on the east side, Resthaven Street on the south side, and School Street on the north side. In 1834, the post office was established and began delivering mail. The justices of the Inferior Court divided the town land into smaller lots and began selling them to people over the next several years, reserving one lot for the county courthouse. During that same year, the Georgia State Legislature incorporated the town of Cumming into the City of Cumming and made it the official government seat of Forsyth County.

A second charter was issued in 1845, decreeing that Cumming's government would follow the mayor–council model of government.

The community is commonly thought to be named after Colonel William Cumming. An alternate theory proposed by a local historian posits the name honors Rev. Frederick Cumming, a professor of Jacob Scudder, a resident of the area since 1815 who owned land in present-day downtown. Yet another theory is that the town is named after Alexander Cuming, the son of a Scottish baronet.

=== Modern history ===
During the 1830s and 1840s, Cumming benefited from the gold mining industry as many businesses were created to meet the needs of the miners. However, the California Gold Rush in 1849 put the city into an economic depression. Newly built railroads bypassed the city and took traffic from the Federal Road that ran near Cumming. The city was spared during the Civil War because William T. Sherman did not pass through the city during his March to the Sea. In 1900, the county courthouse was destroyed in a fire after being struck by lightning; it was rebuilt in 1905.

==== 1912 racial conflict of Cumming ====
In 1912, Governor Joseph M. Brown sent four companies of state militia to Cumming to prevent riots after two reported attacks of young white women, allegedly by Black men. A suspect in the second assault, in which the victim was also raped and later died, was dragged from the Cumming county jail and lynched. The governor then declared martial law, but the effort did little to stop a month-long barrage of attacks by night riders on the Black citizens. This led to the banishment of Blacks, and the city had virtually no Black population.

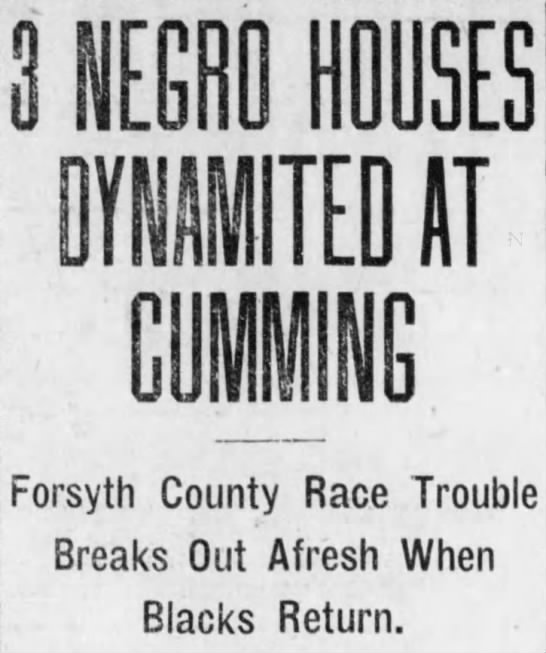
A headline taken from the February 19, 1913, edition of The Atlanta Georgian about violence in Cumming, Georgia

Cumming, Georgia, once had bands of mounted men dubbed "Night Riders", an organization that spread beyond Cumming that had the ambition "to drive every negro out of North Georgia counties", in the months following the 1912 racial conflict in Forsyth County, Georgia. The Night Riders left notices on Black homes at night warning them to vacate, which was "sufficient to cause an exodus of the negroes." By December 1912, Night Riders had begun posting notices on the homes of White farmers who employed Black farmhands, threatening that their barns and homes would be burned if they did not cease to protect their Black workers.

Racial tensions were strained again in 1987 when a group of black people was assaulted while camping at a park on Lake Lanier. This was widely reported by local newspapers and in Atlanta. As a result of this, a local businessman (Note: Some sources specify that the march was revived by Dean and Tammy Carter, while another credits Dean Williams.) decided to hold a "Peace March" the following week. Civil rights leader Reverend Hosea Williams joined the local businessman in a march along Bethelview and Castleberry Road in south Forsyth County into the City of Cumming where they were assaulted by whites. The marchers retreated and vowed to return. During the following "Brotherhood March" on January 24, 1987, another racially mixed group returned to Forsyth County to complete the march that the previous group had been unable to finish. March organizers estimated the number at 20,000, while police estimates ran from 12,000 to 14,000. Hosea Williams and former senator Gary Hart were in the demonstration. A group of the National Guard kept the opposition of about 1,000 in check. Oprah Winfrey featured Cumming and Forsyth County on her The Oprah Winfrey Show. She formed a town hall meeting where one audience member said:

I'm afraid of [blacks] coming to Forsyth County. I was born in Atlanta, and in 1963, the first blacks were bused to West Fulton High School. I go down there now and I see my neighborhood and my community, which was a nice community, and now it's nothing but a rat-infested slum area because they don't care.

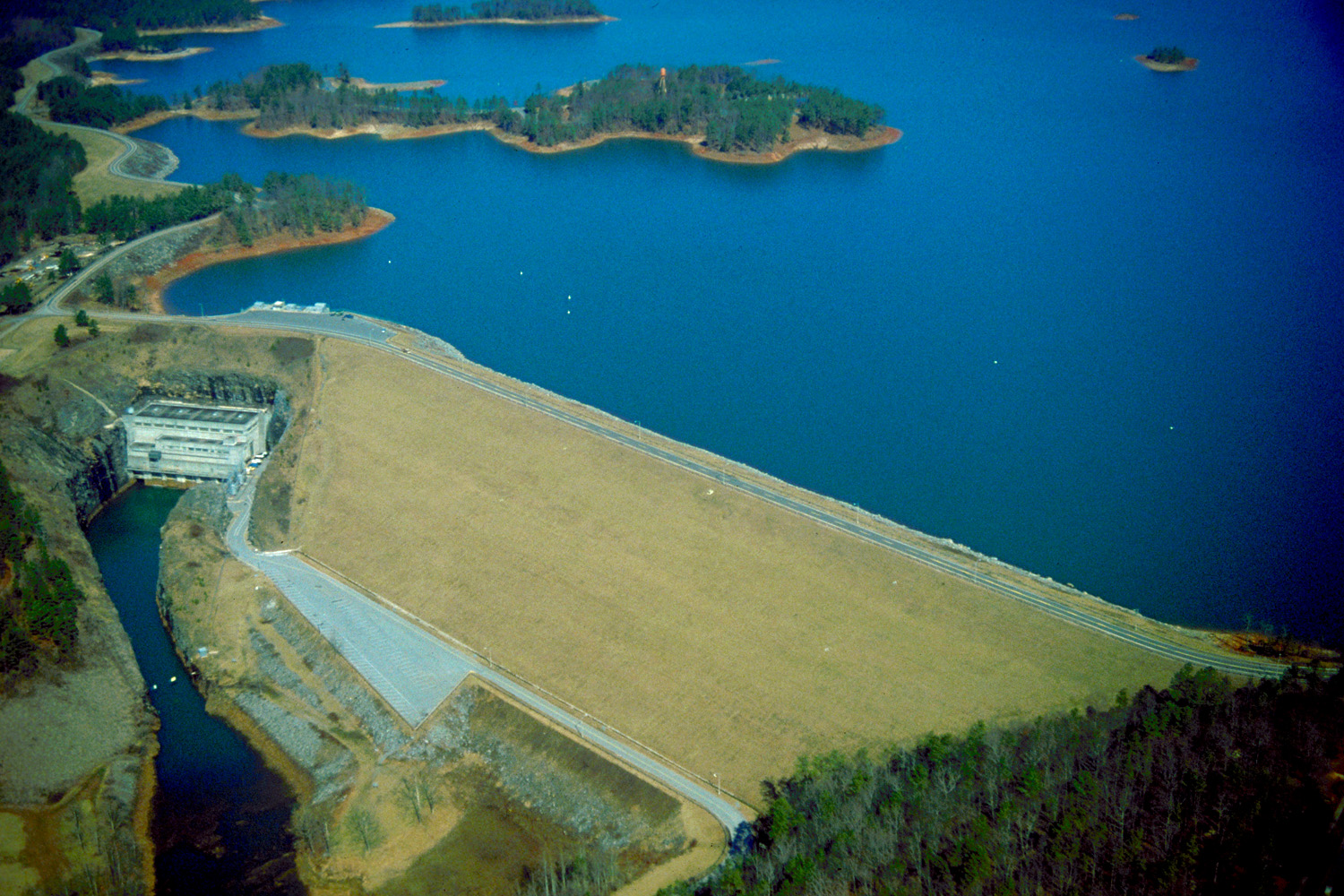
Buford Dam, impounding Lake Lanier on the Chattahoochee River southeast of Cumming

However, most of the audience members agreed that Forsyth County should integrate. Williams was excluded from Oprah's show and arrested for trespassing.

==== City growth ====
Today, the city is experiencing new growth and bears little resemblance to the small rural town it was mere decades ago. The completion of Georgia 400 has helped turn Cumming into a commuter town for metropolitan Atlanta. The city holds the Cumming Country Fair & Festival every October. The Sawnee Mountain Preserve provides views of the city from the top of Sawnee Mountain. In 1956, Buford Dam, along the Chattahoochee River, started operating. The reservoir that it created is called Lake Lanier. The lake, a popular spot for boaters, has generated income from tourists for Cumming and provides a source of drinking water.

== Geography ==
Cumming is located in the center of Forsyth County at 34°12′30″N 84°8′15″W (34.208464, -84.137575). It is 39 miles (63 km) northeast of downtown Atlanta and 15 miles (24 km) northeast of Alpharetta.

According to the United States Census Bureau, Cumming has a total area of 6.1 square miles (15.9 km^{2}), of which 6.1 square miles (15.8 km^{2}) is land and 0.04 square miles (0.1 km^{2}), or 0.58%, is water.

== Demographics ==
Historical population
Census	Pop.	Note	%±
1870	267		—
1880	250		−6.4%
1890	356		42.4%
1900	239		−32.9%
1910	305		27.6%
1920	607		99.0%
1930	648		6.8%
1940	958		47.8%
1950	1,264		31.9%
1960	1,561		23.5%
1970	2,031		30.1%
1980	2,094		3.1%
1990	2,828		35.1%
2000	4,220		49.2%
2010	5,430		28.7%
2020	7,318		34.8%
2025 (est.)	12,494	▲	70.7%
U.S. Decennial Census; 2025

=== 2020 census ===
As of the 2020 census, Cumming had a population of 7,318. The median age was 37.0 years. 23.1% of residents were under the age of 18 and 17.5% of residents were 65 years of age or older. For every 100 females there were 95.6 males, and for every 100 females age 18 and over there were 90.8 males age 18 and over.

100.0% of residents lived in urban areas, while 0.0% lived in rural areas.

There were 2,616 households and 1,368 families residing in the city. Of the households, 37.2% had children under the age of 18 living in them. Of all households, 40.8% were married-couple households, 18.4% were households with a male householder and no spouse or partner present, and 34.3% were households with a female householder and no spouse or partner present. About 30.2% of all households were made up of individuals and 15.1% had someone living alone who was 65 years of age or older.

There were 2,799 housing units, of which 6.5% were vacant. The homeowner vacancy rate was 6.1% and the rental vacancy rate was 4.8%.

Cumming racial composition as of 2020
Race	Num.	Perc.
White (non-Hispanic)	3,999	54.65%
Black or African American (non-Hispanic)	333	4.55%
Native American	6	0.08%
Asian	589	8.05%
Pacific Islander	2	0.03%
Other/Mixed	279	3.81%
Hispanic or Latino	2,110	28.83%

== Government ==
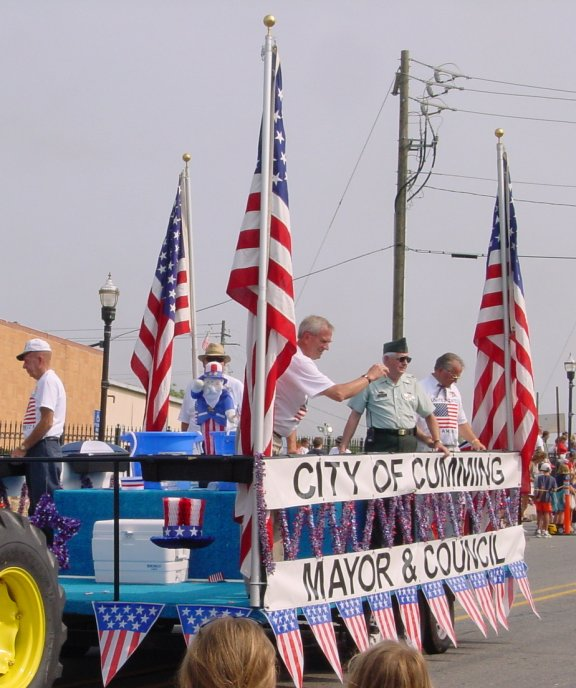
Mayor H. Ford Gravitt and the city council pictured at the Independence Day parade in 2002.

Cumming is a municipal corporation; since 1845, it has been governed by a mayor and a five-member city council. The mayor and council members serve staggered four-year terms.

On December 22, 1834, Cumming was officially incorporated and five councilmen were appointed: John Jolly, William Martin, Daniel McCoy, John H. Russell, and Daniel Smith. The town of Cumming's charter was revised on December 22, 1845, resulting in new councilmen William F. Foster, Arthur Irwin, Major J. Lewis, Henry L. Sims, and Noah Strong.

House Bill 334 was enacted on October 10, 1885, giving Cumming a mayor and a five-person city council.

Former mayor H. Ford Gravitt was first elected to the city council in 1966, and went on to be elected mayor in 1970; Gravitt was mayor of Cumming for 48 years before losing to rival candidate Troy Brumbalow. Brumbalow has held the office since January 2018 and was re-elected in November 2021.

=== City council ===
Year	Mayor	Post 1	Post 2	Post 3	Post 4	Post 5
2011	(since 1970); H. Ford Gravitt	(since 1970); Rupert Sexton	(since 1969); Quincy Holton	(since 1971); Lewis Ledbetter	(since 1993); John Pugh	(since 1979); Ralph Perry
2012	(since 1970); H. Ford Gravitt	(since 1970); Rupert Sexton	(since 1969); Quincy Holton	(since 1971); Lewis Ledbetter	(since 1993); John Pugh	(since 1979); Ralph Perry
2013	(since 1970); H. Ford Gravitt	(since 1970); Rupert Sexton	(since 1969); Quincy Holton	(since 1971); Lewis Ledbetter	(since 1993); John Pugh	(since 1979); Ralph Perry
2014	(since 1970); H. Ford Gravitt	(since 1970); Rupert Sexton	(since 1969); Quincy Holton	(since 1971); Lewis Ledbetter	(since 1993); John Pugh	(since 1979); Ralph Perry
2015	(since 1970); H. Ford Gravitt	(since 1970); Rupert Sexton	(since 1969); Quincy Holton	(since 1971); Lewis Ledbetter	(since 1993); John Pugh	(since 1979); Ralph Perry
2016	(since 1970); H. Ford Gravitt	Chuck Welch	(since 1969); Quincy Holton	(since 1971); Lewis Ledbetter	Christopher Light	Linda Ledbetter
2017	(since 1970); H. Ford Gravitt	Chuck Welch	(since 1969); Quincy Holton	(since 1971); Lewis Ledbetter	Christopher Light	Linda Ledbetter
2018	Troy Brumbalow	Chad Crane	Jason Evans	(since 1971); Lewis Ledbetter	Christopher Light	Linda Ledbetter
2019	Troy Brumbalow	Chad Crane	Jason Evans	(since 1971); Lewis Ledbetter	Christopher Light	Linda Ledbetter
2020	Troy Brumbalow	Chad Crane	Jason Evans	Joey Cochran	Christopher Light	Linda Ledbetter
2021	Troy Brumbalow	Chad Crane	Jason Evans	Joey Cochran	Christopher Light	Linda Ledbetter
2022	Troy Brumbalow	Chad Crane	Jason Evans	Joey Cochran	Christopher Light	Linda Ledbetter
2023	Troy Brumbalow	Chad Crane	Jason Evans	Joey Cochran	Christopher Light	Linda Ledbetter
2024	Troy Brumbalow	Chad Crane	Jason Evans	Joey Cochran	Christopher Light	Susie Charles-Carr
2025	Troy Brumbalow	Chad Crane	Jason Evans	Joey Cochran	Christopher Light	Susie Charles-Carr

=== Previous city council members ===
- William F. Foster, 1845
- H. Ford Gravitt, 1966–1970
- Quincy Holton, 1969–2017 (Post 2)
- Arthur Irwin, 1845
- John Jolly, 1834
- Lewis Ledbetter, 1971–2019 (Post 3)
- Linda Ledbetter, 2016–2019
- Major J. Lewis, 1845
- William Martin, 1834
- Daniel McCoy, 1834
- Dot Otwell, 1956–1957
- Ralph Perry, 1979–2016 (Post 4)
- John D. Pugh, 1993–2016 (Post 5)
- John H. Russell, 1834
- Rupert Sexton, 1970–2015 (Post 1; mayor pro tem)
- Henry L. Sims, 1845
- Daniel Smith, 1834
- Noah Strong, 1845
- Kenneth J. Vanderhoff, 1987–1990
- Charles Welch, 1972–1986
- Chuck Welch, 2015–2017 (Post 1)

=== Previous mayors ===
Many historical records have been destroyed in fires, leaving some information unavailable or unverifiable.

- W. W. Pirkle (possible)
- T. J. Pirkle (possible)
- E. F. Smith (possible)
- Charles Leon Harris, term dates unknown (also Forsyth County School Superintendent, 1912–1916)
- Alman Gwinn Hockenhull, term dates unknown (also Cumming Postmaster, 1913–1922)
- Enoch Wesley Mashburn, 1913–?
- Marcus Mashburn Sr., 1917; 1961–1966
- Joseph Gaither Puett, 1918–1919
- Henry Lowndes "Snacks" Patterson, 1920–1921 (also Georgia General Assembly representative, 1884–1885; Commissioner of Public Instruction, 1892–1910; Blue Ridge Circuit Court judge, 1912–1917)
- John Dickerson Black, 1922–1923 (also Georgia General Assembly representative, 1933–1936)
- Andrew Benjamin "Ben" Tollison, 1926–1927 (also Forsyth County School Superintendent, 1920–1932)
- Roy Pilgrim Otwell, 1928–1956; 1959–1960
- Marcus Mashburn Jr., 1957–1958
- George Ingram, 1966–1970
- H. Ford Gravitt, 1970–2018

== Education ==
Cumming is served by Forsyth County Schools with nine major high schools in the county.

High schools

- Alliance Academy for Innovation
- Denmark High School
- East Forsyth High School
- Forsyth Central High School
- Lambert High School
- North Forsyth High School
- Pinecrest Academy
- South Forsyth High School
- West Forsyth High School

=== Higher education ===
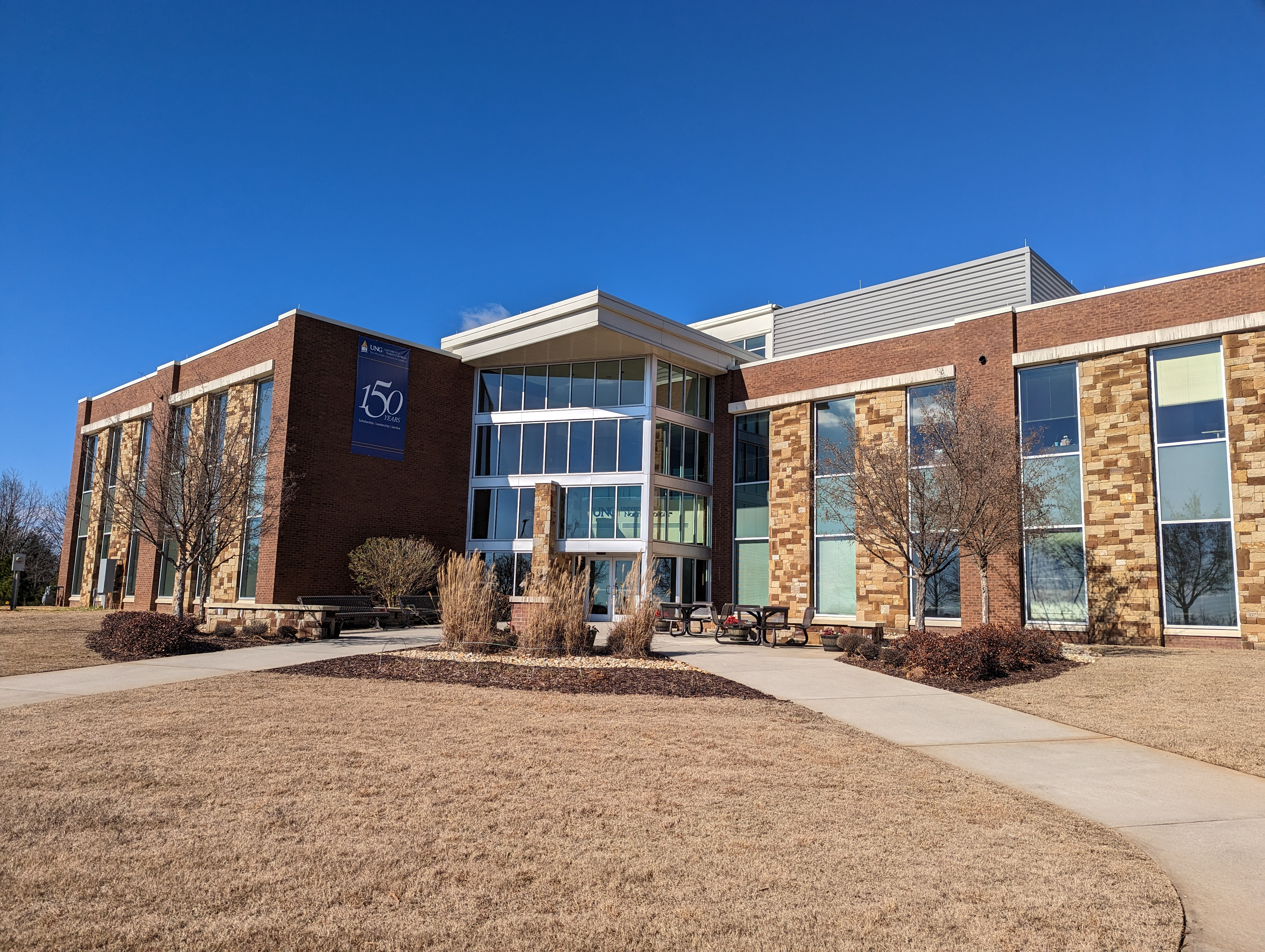
The library at the University of North Georgia Cumming campus

In 2012, the University of North Georgia established its Cumming campus.

- Montessori Academy at Sharon Springs
- Mountain Education

== Transportation ==
=== Major highways ===
- U.S. Route 19
- State Route 9
- State Route 20
- State Route 306
- State Route 400

=== Pedestrians and cycling ===
- Big Creek Greenway

== Notable people ==
- Luke Appling, Hall of Fame Major League Baseball player
- Zac Brown, lead singer of the Grammy Award-winning Zac Brown Band, was born in Cumming
- Col. William Cumming, distinguished officer in the War of 1812, probable eponym of the town of Cumming (incorporated 1834)
- Skyler Day, actress born in Cumming
- Geoff Duncan, businessman and Lieutenant Governor of Georgia from 2019 to 2023
- Wynn Everett, actress raised in Cumming.
- Dylan Fairchild, offensive guard for the Cincinnati Bengals
- Kelli Giddish, actress born and raised in Cumming
- Colby Gossett, NFL player born and raised in Cumming
- Ethan Hankins, Cleveland Guardians baseball player
- R. J. Helton, Christian music artist who placed fifth on the first season of American Idol
- Rachael Kirkconnell, winner of The Bachelor season 25, born and raised in Cumming
- Billy Magnussen, Tony Award nominated actor
- Dylan Murry, racing driver
- Phoenix, drag queen, competed on season 3 of RuPaul's Drag Race and season 10 of RuPaul's Drag Race All Stars
- Ron Reis, former World Championship Wrestling wrestler also known as The Yeti, lives in Cumming
- Junior Samples, comedian on the TV show Hee Haw
- Glenn Sutko, former catcher for the Cincinnati Reds
- Roger L. Worsley, college administrator, formerly resided in Cumming

== In popular culture ==
- American Reunion was partially filmed in Cumming at Mary Alice Park
- Peach State Cats, Arena Football team in Cumming, Georgia
- Unsolved Mysteries, Season 1 Episode 2 takes place in Cumming, Georgia
- Smokey and the Bandit, Buford Dam Rd and GA400 both located in Cumming were used as filming locations

== See also ==
- List of sundown towns in the United States
- Death of Tamla Horsford
