= MRPA =

MRPA may refer to:

- Metropolitan River Protection Act, an environmental protection law in Georgia, U.S.
- Metropolitan Regional Planning Authority, later Western Australian Planning Commission
