= Tamla (given name) =

Tamla is a given name. Notable people with the name include:

- Tamla Horsford (died 2018)
- Tamla Kari (born 1988), English actress
- Mekeme Tamla Ladji, (born 1985), Ivorian footballer
