= WWEV-FM =

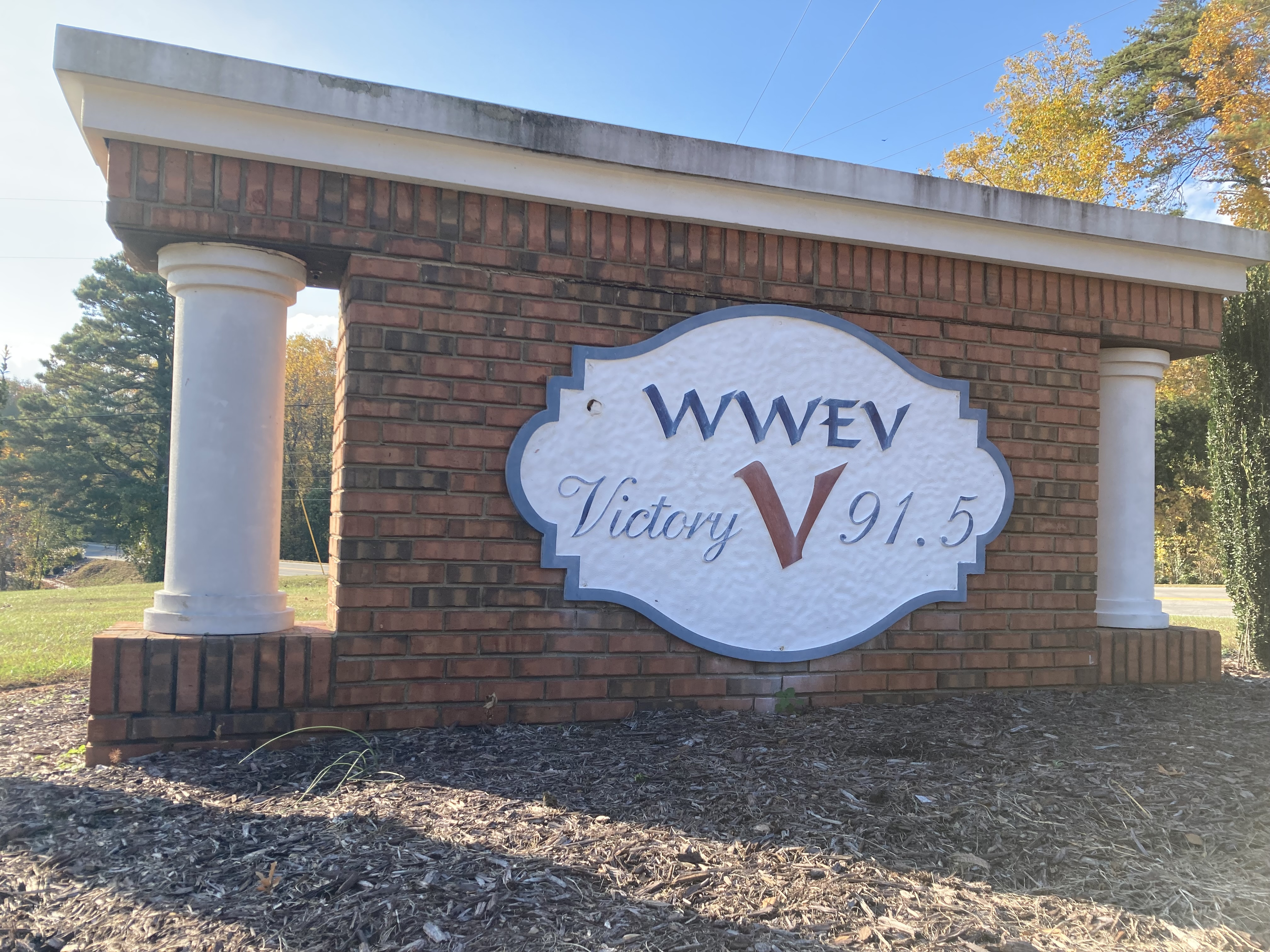
- Cumming, Georgia; United States
- Broadcast area: Northeast Atlanta metropolitan area
- Branding: Victory 91.5

Programming
- Format: Contemporary worship music; Christian talk and teaching

Ownership
- Owner: RLN Global, Inc.

History
- First air date: December 15, 1981

Technical information
- Licensing authority: FCC
- Facility ID: 14744
- Class: C2
- ERP: 8,900 watts
- HAAT: 293 meters (961 ft)
- Transmitter coordinates: 34.237°N 84.160°W

Links
- Public license information: Public file; LMS
- Webcast: Victory.Radio/Listen
- Website: Victory.Radio

WWEV-FM (91.5 MHz) is a non-commercial Christian radio station licensed to Cumming, Georgia, and serving the Northeast Atlanta metropolitan area. It is owned by RLN Global, Inc. and calls itself Victory 91.5. The station has a contemporary Christian format with some Christian talk and teaching programs. WWEV-FM funds its operations by asking for listener donations and holding periodic fundraising drives on the air.

The Victory 91.5 studios and offices are on Sawnee Drive in Cumming. The transmitter is off Tower Road on Sawnee Mountain.

== History ==
=== Early years ===
The station signed on the air on December 15, 1981. It was originally owned by the Curriculum Development Foundation and broadcast at only 220 watts. It has always been a Christian radio station, but with different programming and music at its founding. In its early days, the radio station was totally automated. The music and announcers were pre-recorded. The tapes were shuttled back and forth to the transmitter site on Sawnee Mountain in Cumming. The operations were in a one-room portable building at the base of the tower on top of the mountain. Bad weather made changing the tapes dangerous and difficult.

Jim Pennington was the first General Manager and in the early years Bonnie Voss was the only on-air personality. The station hired Mike Fernandez as the afternoon announcer in 1983. His slot was called "Heading Home with Mike." Fernandez was instrumental in bringing contemporary Christian music to the station. In 1984, Tim Bagley was hired to do fill in work but later started one of the longest running Christian rock shows in the United States, "Powersource".

=== Music ===
In the early history of the station the music was different from the current style. Most of the playlist could be classified as inspirational with some southern gospel artists. The music included such artists as Doug Oldham, George Beverly Shea, The Continental Singers and The Haven of Rest Quartet.

The format was changed to all contemporary in 1985 when Barry Holt became the General Manager. The music aired on the station is selected for its message content. Music makes up most of the 24-hour day, targeted to young and middle-aged listeners, with special emphasis on youth on Saturday night. A couple of hours each day are set aside for Christian talk and teaching.

== Technology ==
Victory 91.5 made the switch from https://victory915.com to https://victory.radio on May 9, 2017. The radio station was one of the first to have access to the EBU's new gTLD.
