= William B. Hartsfield =

American politician and Atlanta mayor (1890–1971)

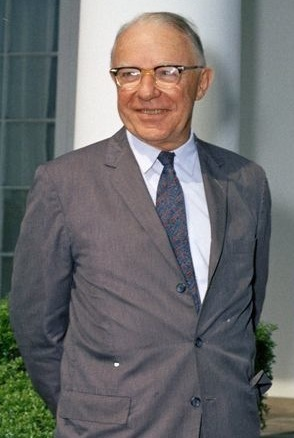
- Hartsfield in 1961

49th & 51st Mayor of Atlanta
- In office 1942–1962
- Preceded by: George B. Lyle
- Succeeded by: Ivan Allen Jr.
- In office 1937–1941
- Preceded by: James L. Key
- Succeeded by: Roy LeCraw

25th President of the National League of Cities
- In office 1953
- Preceded by: Albert Cobo
- Succeeded by: William E. Kemp

Personal details
- Born: William Berry Hartsfield; March 1, 1890 Atlanta, Georgia, U.S.
- Died: February 22, 1971 (aged 80) Manhattan, New York City, New York, U.S.
- Party: Democratic
- Spouse(s): Pearl Williams (m. 1913; div. 1962) Tollie Bedenbaugh Tolan (m. 1962)
- Children: William B. Hartsfield Jr. Mildred Hartsfield; Carl Tolan Hartsfield (adopted)

William Berry Hartsfield Sr. (March 1, 1890 – February 22, 1971) was an American politician who served as the 49th and 51st mayor of Atlanta, Georgia. His tenure extended from 1937 to 1941 and again from 1942 to 1962, making Hartsfield the longest-serving mayor of his native Atlanta, Georgia.

== Early career ==
Hartsfield worked as a clerk while reading law for the law firm of Rosser, Brandon, Slaton & Phillips beginning in 1916. He entered politics in 1922 by winning a city alderman seat. Hartsfield served two terms in the Georgia House of Representatives during the 1930s.

== Mayor of Atlanta ==
Hartsfield was first elected Mayor of Atlanta in January 1937. Upon taking office, the city was $3 million in debt due to the Great Depression. He quickly turned around the city's finances, but lost re-election in 1940. The man who defeated Hartsfield, Roy LeCraw, served just one year as mayor, before being called up as a reservist in the United States Army Air Force. Hartsfield won election in 1942, and remained in office until 1961.

Biographer Harold Martin described Hartsfield as "a man fanatically addicted to the media." By the mid-1950s, Hartsfield owned eight radios, three television sets, a combination radio-phonograph, a high-fidelity record player, a wire recorder, and a tape recorder. He told an interviewer: "This way, I can keep up all the time with what's going on in Atlanta and all the world. I tell people I'm an electronic mayor. Actually, I'm just a gadget bug."

In an obituary for Hartsfield, The New York Times credited him with developing Atlanta into a national aviation center. Hartsfield was lauded by the Upper Chattahoochee Development Association in 1957 for his work in promoting the Buford Dam. The dam helped create a source of water, Lake Lanier for the Atlanta metropolitan area.

Hartsfield received an honorary degree in Doctor of Laws from Oglethorpe University in 1961.

Hartsfield served as president of the National League of Cities in 1953.

=== Race ===
The New York Times called Hartsfield a "racial moderate," highlighting his slogan "Atlanta is a city too busy to hate", which Hartsfield often repeated during the civil rights struggles of the 1950s. In 1957, he won the election to his last term as mayor by defeating the staunch segregationist and future Governor Lester Maddox.

Before Christmas 1955, Hartsfield ordered Atlanta's city golf courses be opened to African-American golfers.

Throughout much of the 1940s, Hartsfield pushed for Atlanta to annex a number of predominantly White suburbs, fearing that Atlanta's "Negro population is growing by leaps and bounds," resulting in the loss of "White territory inside Atlanta," and hoped that the inclusion of these suburbs would prevent the city's Black population from becoming a "potent political force in Atlanta." While residents of these suburbs rejected annexation in a 1947 referendum, legislation was passed which annexed these communities in 1952, tripling Atlanta's area, and adding 100,000 new residents to the city.

== Legacy ==
Willie B., a gorilla that became a popular attraction at Zoo Atlanta for decades, was named for Hartsfield.

Hartsfield–Jackson Atlanta International Airport is named in Hartsfield's honor as well as a later mayor, Maynard Jackson, who led the modernization of the airport in the 1970s.

Preceded by James L. Key	Mayor of Atlanta; 1937–1941	Succeeded by Roy LeCraw
Preceded by George B. Lyle (acting)	Mayor of Atlanta; 1942–1962	Succeeded by Ivan Allen Jr.
