= William Cumming (colonel) =

American planter and soldier (1788–1863)

William Clay Cumming (July 27, 1788 – February 18, 1863) was an American planter and soldier from Augusta, Georgia.

== Early life ==
William Cumming was born in Augusta to Thomas and Ann (Clay) Cumming. He graduated from the College of New Jersey (later Princeton University) and studied law in Litchfield, Connecticut. When he returned to Augusta, he bought land and became a planter.

== Military service ==
Cumming joined the militia, becoming captain of an independent company called the Augusta Blues. When the unit was mustered into the regular army for service in the War of 1812 he was commissioned as a major in the 8th Infantry. In February 1814 he was promoted to colonel and named as adjutant general for the Northern Army.

Colonel Cumming fought on the St. Lawrence frontier and in the Niagara campaign. He was cited for gallantry and leadership. He was lightly wounded in November 1813 at the Battle of Crysler's Farm.

== Later life ==
In 1847, President Polk offered Cumming the rank of Major General to participate in the Mexican–American War, but his age and declining health caused him to turn down the offer. Cumming died in Augusta in 1863. The town of Cumming, Georgia is believed to be named in his honor, however, this is not proven.
