= Metropolitan River Protection Act =

Metropolitan River Protection Act (Georgia Code 12-5-440 et seq.) was enacted in 1973 by the Georgia General Assembly to establish a 2000-foot Corridor along the banks of the Chattahoochee River and its impoundments for the 48 miles between Buford Dam and Peachtree Creek.

== History ==
Enacted in 1973, the Metropolitan River Protection Act initially covered a 48-mile corridor between Buford Dam (on the north) and Peachtree Creek, to the south. In 1998, the Act was amended to extend the corridor an additional 36 miles to the downstream limits of Fulton and Douglas Counties.

=== Atlanta Regional Commission ===
The Act requires the Atlanta Regional Commission (ARC) to adopt a plan to protect the Chattahoochee River corridor and to review development proposals for consistency with the plan. Local governments along the corridor must implement the plan by issuing permits based on ARC findings, monitoring land-disturbing activities, and enforcing the Act and the plan. According to the Act, any land-disturbing activity within the corridor must adhere to the adopted plan to be considered legal.
