= Sawnee Mountain =

Mountain in Georgia, United States

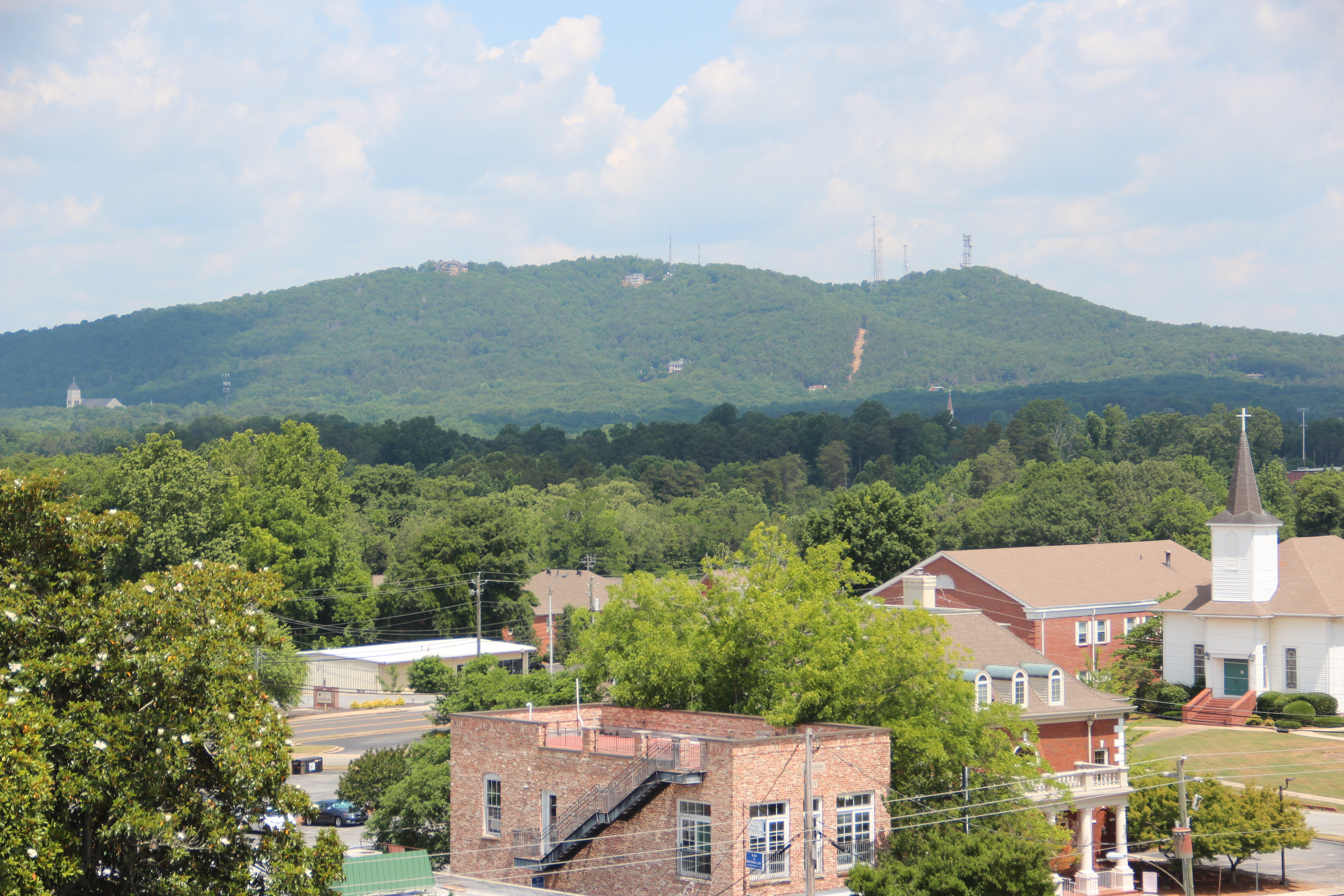
- Sawnee Mountain viewed from Cumming

Highest point
- Elevation: 1,946 ft (593 m)
- Prominence: approx. 750 feet
- Coordinates: 34.236671°N 84.160561°W

Geography
- Location: Forsyth County, Georgia, U.S.
- Parent range: Appalachian Mountains
- Topo map: USGS Cumming

Climbing
- Easiest route: Drive to Sawnee, Hike to Little Sawnee

Sawnee Mountain is a low mountain between the piedmont and Appalachian foothills of the U.S. state of Georgia, north of Atlanta. Average rainfall/46.26in/yr/ average snowfall/5.7in/yr/. The name Sawnee Mountain actually refers to the entire ridge of approximately five miles (8 km) in length. At its summit, the elevation is 1,946 feet (593 m) above mean sea level, and is roughly 750 feet (230 m) above the surrounding terrain. The Sawnee Mountain range runs southwest to northeast, and consists of five knolls and three gaps (Chamblee, Sawnee, and Bettes). Located only a few miles north of Cumming, Georgia (the county seat), the mountain is the highest point in Forsyth county at 1,946 ft (593 m) above sea level. One of the highest peaks of metro Atlanta, it is taller than its more well-known neighbors Stone Mountain and Kennesaw Mountain by 260 ft (79 m) and 138 ft (42 m) respectively. Compared to other mountains in the area, however, Sawnee Mountain sits behind Bear Mountain and Pine Log Mountain, both in neighboring Cherokee County to the west.

== Sawnee Mountain Preserve ==
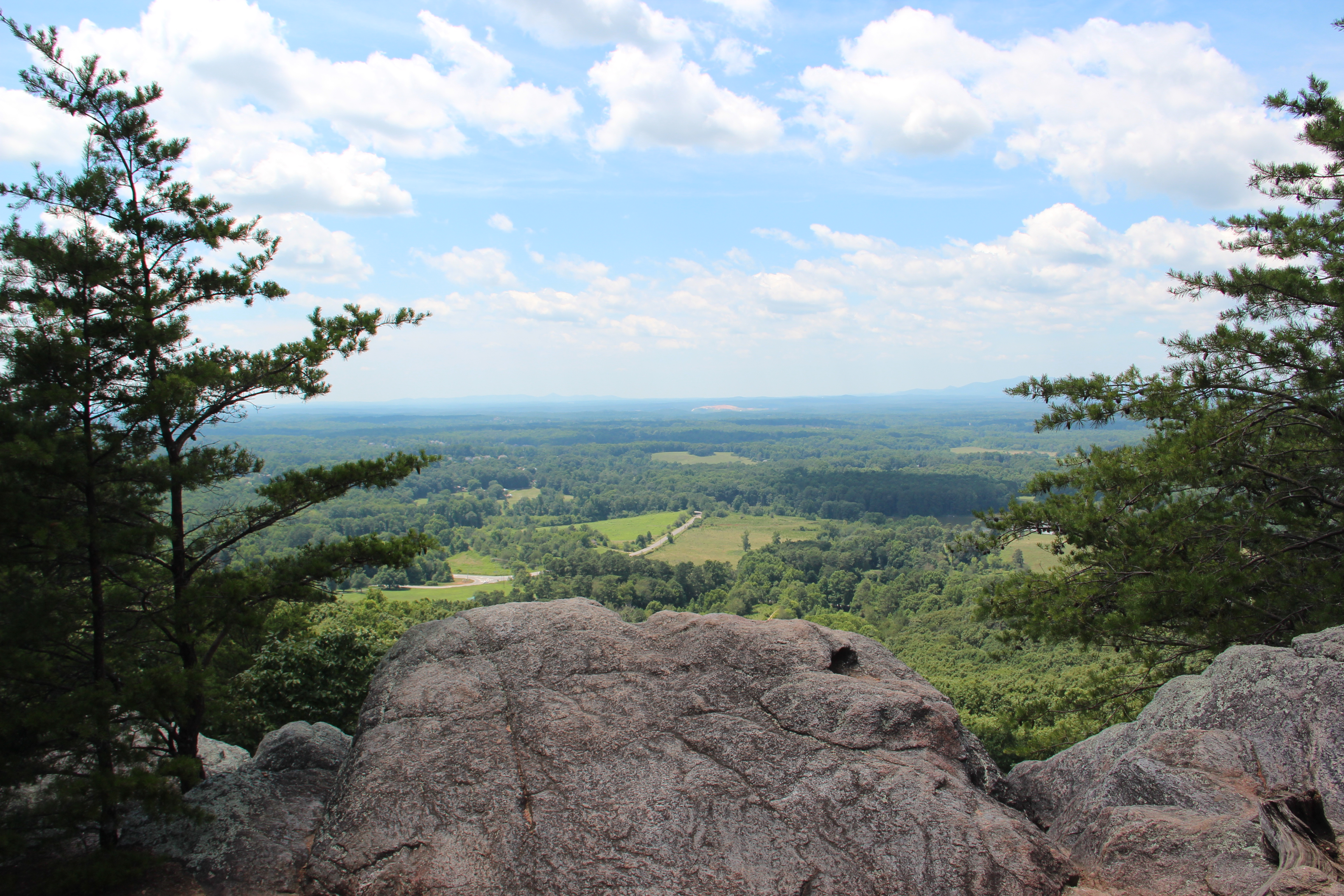
Sawnee Mountain view

The Sawnee Mountain Preserve protects 963 acres of the mountain and is managed by the Natural Resource Management Division of Forsyth County Parks and Recreation.

The Visitor Center features interactive exhibits about the natural and cultural histories of Sawnee Mountain, and a resource library and lounge. Environmental education programs are offered for school, scout and other groups, and a summer camp program is operated by the county.

== History ==
It is believed that Native Americans may have used a natural clearing atop the mountain called the Indian Seats for ceremonial purposes. As white settlers migrated to the area, now known as Cumming, a local Cherokee named Sawnee helped them adjust to the native land. As a well skilled carpenter and farmer he was known throughout the land. He was later driven away from their native lands by these white settlers and died while traveling on the Trail of Tears. The range was named in his honor. In 1829 gold was discovered in Georgia in Auraria at the site of America's first gold rush. There are also mines in the ridges of Sawnee which is downstream the Chattahoochee from the major strike. Current uses of the mountain are as a nature preserve park and a Radio station, WWEV-FM 91.5, which transmits from a radio tower at the top of the mountain. Originally, the station staff actually drove recorded programming to the top where it played from broadcast automation equipment, but it now uses a live studio/transmitter link. The Sawnee Mountain Visitor Center is located at 4075 Spot Road and is one of the trailheads.

On January 27, 2026, Georgia House member David Clark announced on Facebook that he introduced a resolution to rename Sawnee Mountain to Trump Mountain "to honor [President Donald Trump's] historic legacy of Making America Great Again.".

== See also ==
- List of mountains in Georgia (U.S. state)
