= George B. Lyle =

American politician (1884–1948)

George Browning Lyle (January 18, 1884 – December 14, 1948) was briefly mayor of Atlanta during the month of May in 1942. Roy LeCraw had fought a tough campaign against incumbent William Hartsfield and won on a slim margin but just a few months after taking office, he joined the army leaving mayor pro-tem Lyle until new elections could be held. In late May, Hartsfield was elected by a large margin being the only well-known candidate. Lyle died on December 14, 1948, at the age of 64.

Political offices
Preceded by Roy LeCraw	Acting Mayor of Atlanta; May 1942	Succeeded by William B. Hartsfield
