= Lake Lanier Islands =

Resort complex in Georgia, United States

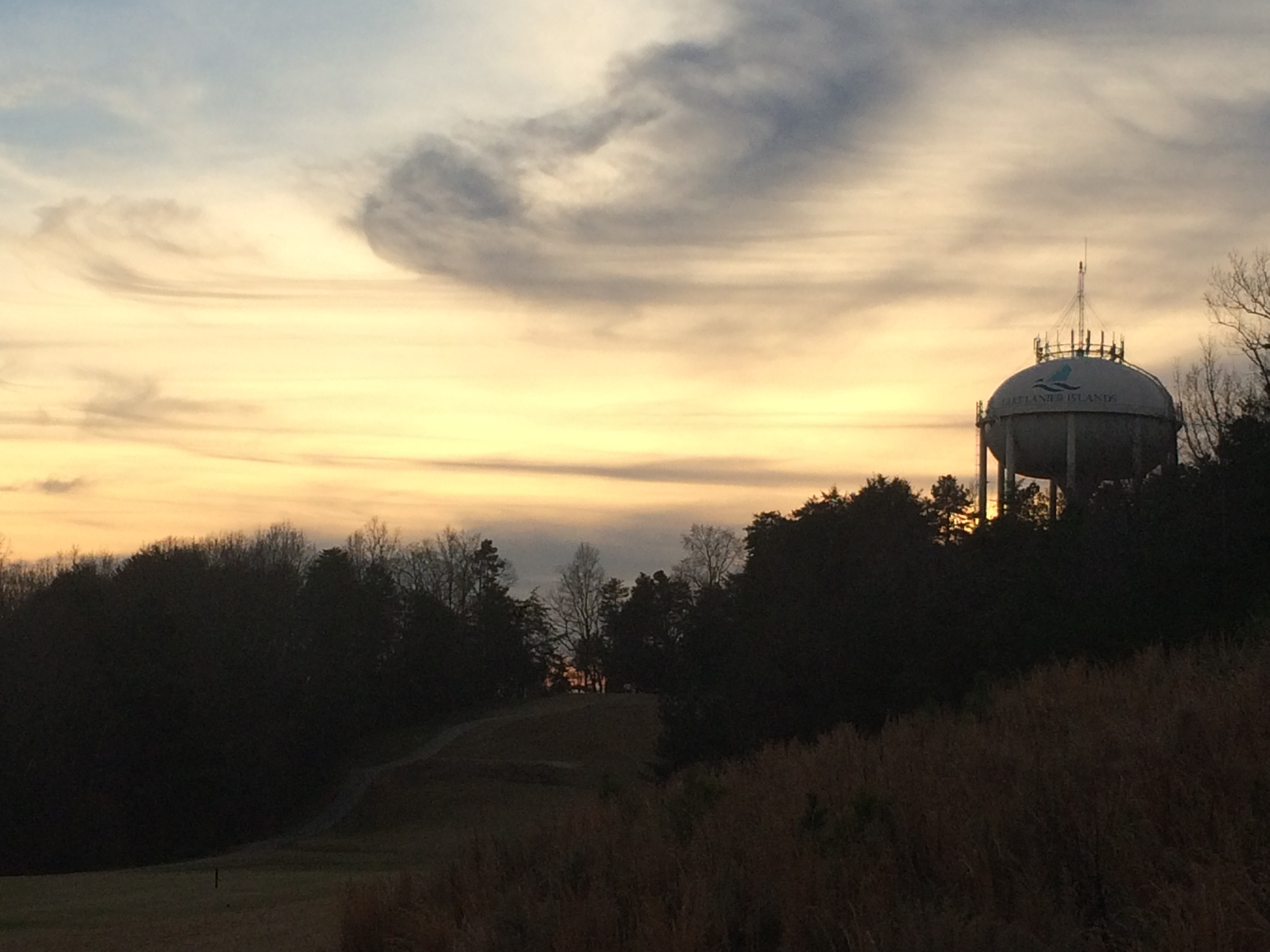
- Lake Lanier Islands Water tower, December 2015

- Location within Georgia

Geography
- Location: Lake Lanier
- Coordinates: 34.1776°N 84.0301°W
- Archipelago: Lake Lanier Islands
- Coastline: 1 mi (2 km)

Administration
- United States
- State: Georgia

Additional information
- Official website: http://www.lanierislands.com

Lake Lanier Islands is a resort complex built on a small group of islands on Lake Lanier, the largest lake in Georgia, located 60 miles northeast of Atlanta, Georgia. The resort complex was established in 1974 and includes a hotel, water park, golf course, multiple conference and meeting venues, beaches, boat docks, and a number of other recreational amenities.

== History ==
The Lake Lanier islands were originally large hills near Gainesville. After the creation of Buford Dam and the flooding of part of the Chattahoochee River valley created Lake Lanier, the hills became the largest chain of islands in the lake. In 1957, The US Army Corps of Engineers leased the Lake Lanier islands to the Georgia Department of State Parks, which partnered with the newly created Lake Lanier Islands Development Authority (LLIDA) in 1962 to manage and develop a recreational venue for the citizens of Georgia to enjoy. Development included Harbor Landing boat docks, campgrounds, horse stables, beaches, a golf course and the PineIsle Hotel. The complex opened in 1974, and the PineIsle Hotel opened the following year. A water park opened in 1987. Events held at the complex include annual Independence Day fireworks, on the lake, full moon parties, and "Magical Nights of Lights." The State of Georgia contracted with the KSL Corporation to take over the day-to-day management and operations of Lake Lanier Islands.

In August 2005, Virgil Williams, through his venture, Lake Lanier Islands Management Company, bought the resort complex from the KSL Corporation. The purchase was for 14.5 million dollars. Since purchasing the resort, the KLL Corporation has worked to improve the islands. The PineIsle resort closed that year and was demolished in 2008.

Under the ownership of the Lake Lanier Islands Management Company, the property has received numerous upgrades and renovations. In 2008, it completed renovations at Legacy Lodge & Conference Center when the previous Emerald Point Hotel & Conference Center "was completely rebuilt using only the shell of the original structure." In April 2014, Legacy Lodge opened a saltwater lounging pool, replacing their previous pool and hot tubs. In the summer of 2016, Legacy Lodge & Conference center, the hotel on Lanier Islands, underwent a $2 million renovation. The upgrades included "214 rooms now have new hardwood floors, artwork and decor with an outdoors theme, as well as new bedding, mini-refrigerators and Keurig coffee makers. Other upgrades include newly painted woodwork and ceilings throughout the hotel, new wallcoverings in guest rooms and corridors, new carpets in corridors and new lighting and window treatments."

In 2018 the Lake Lanier Islands Management Company made a deal with Jimmy Buffett's Margaritaville Development and SafeHarbor in order to invest millions of dollars into the island and theme park LanierWorld, and assume management.
