= Roy LeCraw =

American politician

Roy LeCraw (May 1, 1895 – February 21, 1985) served part of one term as the 50th Mayor of Atlanta, Georgia before resigning to join the U.S. Army at the beginning of World War II.

He was a self-confident insurance man and an officer in the National Guard. A charter member and the 1924 President of the Atlanta Junior Chamber of Commerce, he served as president of the Atlanta Chamber of Commerce starting in 1932 and ran for mayor in 1934, but was soundly defeated by James L. Key. The next mayor, William B. Hartsfield, saw many of Atlanta's best business and professional people begin to leave the city for life in the suburbs and a labor-friendly candidate such as LeCraw became more popular. This caused Hartsfield to start the campaign to annex Buckhead, but on September 4, 1940, LeCraw defeated Hartsfield by 111 votes.

His tenure was to be short-lived, however. He joined the Army, resigning his post in May 1942 when mayor pro tem George B. Lyle took over until a special election could be held on May 27, in which Hartsfield defeated eight opponents.

LeCraw served in Europe and after the war he returned and ran again in 1945 but was defeated by Hartsfield. In 1948, he served as a state senator, and in 1954 lost a bid for the U.S. Congress. He served in Korea and received the Bronze Star.

In the 1960s he raised money for and founded many Presbyterian churches in the various countries he had visited.

== Christian Service ==
LeCraw became a missionary later in life. He traveled to the far east and help start over 150 churches.

== Honors ==
In 2002 a lamp was installed in his honor at 2970 Peachtree Road in Buckhead.

== Succession ==
Preceded by William B. Hartsfield	Mayor of Atlanta; 1941–1942	Succeeded by George B. Lyle (acting)
