= Death of Tamla Horsford =

2018 death in Jeanne Cumming, Georgia

- Date: November 4, 2018; 7 years ago
- Location: 4450 Woodlet Ct, Cumming, Georgia, U.S.
- Cause: Death by falling; manner of death disputed
- Outcome: First investigation: ruled to be accidental, fall due to intoxication, odd circumstances; Second investigation: ruled to be accidental, fall due to intoxication
- Deaths: Tamla Horsford, aged 40
- Inquiries: First investigation: Forsyth County Sheriff's Office; Second investigation: Georgia Bureau of Investigation
- Arrests: None

On November 4, 2018, Tamla Horsford was discovered dead in the backyard of the Cumming, Georgia, home where she had been attending a slumber party with other "football moms" the night before. The 40-year-old was a mother of five.

The Forsyth County Sheriff's Department initially ruled the death an accident, stating that the "multiple blunt force injuries" were related to Horsford's likely falling from the balcony due to "acute ethanol intoxication". A second autopsy requested by her family revealed further abrasions to her body. The family's attorney also stated that the lack of evidence, the types of injuries discovered, and mismatched witness accounts strongly suggested homicide. On February 20, 2019, Major Joe Perkins of the Forsyth County Sheriff's Office announced that the case would be closed and that there was no evidence of foul play.

Horsford's death and the subsequent conclusion of the investigation has been a subject of controversy and debate, considering Horsford was the only black woman at the sleepover that otherwise consisted of only white women. This implies a race-based dimension to her death which has been supported by her family. The official investigation concluded that her death was accidental and not racially motivated, further causing some to argue that her race played a role in the events leading up to her death and in the investigation that followed, especially considering the results of the second autopsy.

The case did not receive public recognition until two months after her death, when one of the witnesses Jose Barrera was fired from his county court officer job for internally accessing the incident report. The case, along with the hashtag #tamlahorsford, quickly spread around the internet, along with suspicion of foul play. In the summer of 2020, the nationwide protests against racism and police brutality sparked by the murder of George Floyd renewed public interest and advocacy for the case. Under the pressure of public outcry, including posts from celebrities such as T.I. and 50 Cent, the Forsyth County Sheriff requested that the case be reopened and investigated by the Georgia Bureau of Investigation.

== Death ==
Horsford arrived at the slumber party at 10 p.m. on November 3, 2018. Attendees drank, watched football, and played Cards Against Humanity. There were also three men at the house. According to witnesses, Horsford got up at 2 a.m. to smoke a cigarette on the back porch. The next morning at 7:30 a.m., the homeowner's aunt found Horsford lying facedown and motionless under the porch. At 8:59 a.m., Jose Barrera, the homeowner's boyfriend, called 9-1-1. In the 9-1-1 call, Barrera described Horsford as lying facedown and not breathing. He brought attention to a small cut on her wrist, suggesting that it may be self-inflicted. A woman's voice can also be heard on the call speculating that Horsford might have been pushed from the balcony. The police arrived at 9:07 am.

== Initial investigation ==
The initial autopsy ordered by the Forsyth Sheriff's Office discovered "multiple blunt force injuries" and a high blood alcohol level. Officials speculated that the latter caused her to fall from the porch and that the injuries were just a result of the 14-foot fall. Horsford's family and friends, however, were not convinced and called for a second independent autopsy; this was then carried out by the Georgia Bureau of Investigation (GBI).

According to the GBI medical examiner's report, Horsford sustained severe injuries to her head, neck, and torso. They discovered cuts on her face, wrist, hand, and lower legs, as well as a "laceration to the right ventricle" of her heart. The GBI toxicology screening found a blood alcohol level of .238 and traces of THC and Alprazolam (an anxiety medication) at the time of her death.

Even before the results of the autopsy, speculation of foul play had begun to spread online. This was prompted, two months after Horsford's death, by Forsyth County Court firing Barrera, then a court officer, for accessing the incident report internally on multiple occasions. Hundreds of people shared the hashtag #tamlahorsford, questioning different angles of the case and calling for justice.

The case was officially closed on February 20, 2019, ruled as an accidental death. Major Joe Perkins of the Forsyth County Sheriff's Office stated that none of Horsford's injuries aligned with foul play, saying, "It was a party. They were drinking. She was drinking. Most of the partygoers had gone to bed at that time, and she was on the deck alone." He had interviewed 30 people, including family, friends, and other partygoers.

== Renewed public interest ==
After fading from the public eye, Horsford's death became a topic of advocacy again during the George Floyd anti-police brutality protests of 2020. On June 5, 2020, Ralph E. Fernandez, the Horsford family attorney, wrote a letter to Horsford's husband, Leander Horsford, claiming that his team's investigation into the details of the case strongly suggested homicide. It said, in part: "Witness statements are in conflict. A potential subject handled the body as well as the evidence prior to law enforcement arriving. Evidence was disposed of, and no inquiry followed. The scene was not preserved." He also stated that Horsford's injuries were "consistent" with those of a physical struggle, but that the absence of photos from the initial autopsy prevented a definite conclusion. An Atlanta journalist published the letter a few days later.

Horsford's name and case spread across the internet, starting with protestors in Cumming, Georgia, who included her name on their signs alongside the names of Black Americans killed by the police in recent years. A Change.org petition calling for the case to be reopened amassed more than 709k+ signatures, and rappers T.I. and 50 Cent shared posts about the case, asking for a second investigation.

== Second investigation ==
On June 12, 2020, Forsyth County Sheriff Ron Freeman sent a letter requesting that the case be reopened and investigated by the GBI. He stated that the investigation was best undertaken by an independent law enforcement agency. The GBI agreed to reopen the case on June 18, 2020, but did not specify when the investigation would begin.

On July 28, 2021, the GBI concluded its re-investigation, ultimately deciding not to pursue criminal charges.
