= Lake Lanier =

Reservoir in Georgia, United States

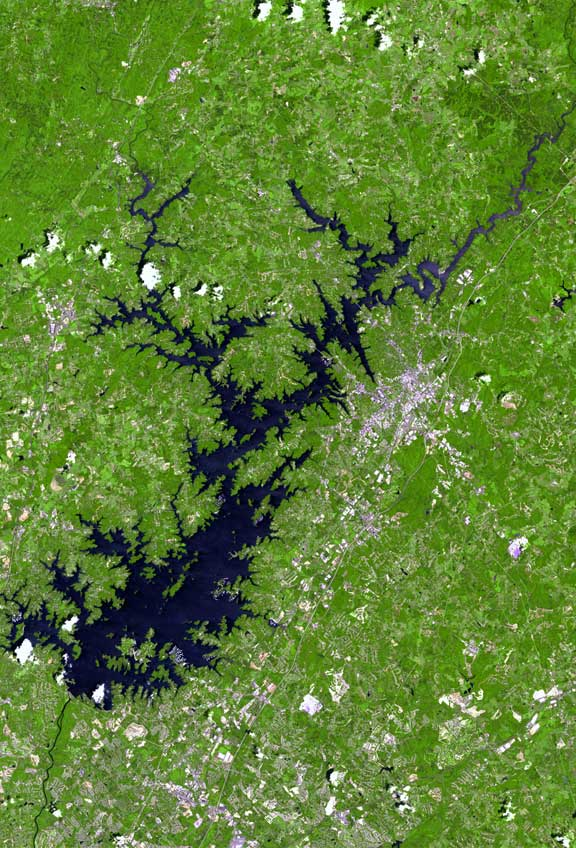
- Satellite imagery of Lake Lanier and surrounding area, c. 2006

- Location within Georgia Location within the United States
- Location: Georgia
- Coordinates: 34°14′24″N 83°57′00″W
- Type: reservoir, from 1956
- Primary inflows: Chattahoochee River, Chestatee River
- Primary outflows: Chattahoochee River
- Catchment area: 1,040 mi^{2} (2,700 km^{2})
- Basin countries: United States
- Surface area: 37,000 acres (15,000 ha; 58 mi^{2})
- Max. depth: 156 ft (48 m)
- Water volume: 1,049,400 acre⋅ft (1.2944 km^{3})
- Surface elevation: 1,071 ft (326.4 m) summer 1,070 ft (326.1 m) winter
- Website: lakelanier.com

Lake Lanier (officially Lake Sidney Lanier) is a reservoir in the northern portion of the U.S. state of Georgia. It was created by the completion of Buford Dam on the Chattahoochee River in 1956, and is also fed by the waters of the Chestatee River. The lake encompasses 38,000 acres (15,000 ha) or 59 mi^{2} (150 km^{2}) of water, and 692 mi (1,114 km) of shoreline at normal level, a "full pool" of 1,071 ft (326 m) above mean sea level and the exact shoreline varies by resolution according to the coastline paradox. Named for Confederate veteran and poet Sidney Lanier, which has caused recent renaming controversies and public debate. It was built and is operated by the U.S. Army Corps of Engineers for flood control and water supplies. Its construction destroyed more than 50,000 acres (20,000 ha) of farmland and displaced more than 250 families, 15 businesses, and relocated 20 cemeteries along with their remains in the process.

It is patrolled by the Georgia Department of Natural Resources (GDNR), as well as local law enforcement. The states of Georgia, Alabama, and Florida all have rights to the water of the reservoir, as it feeds rivers going through those areas. The Corps of Engineers has responsibilities to regulate flow for flood control and water use. In addition, it has to ensure that water is available to fulfill such federal mandates as under the Endangered Species Act, to support downstream species. The rapid suburbanization of the Atlanta region, in particular, has greatly increased water consumption by private homeowners for lawns and gardens. During droughts of the 21st century, Lake Lanier reached record lows, and regional actions have been needed to reduce state water usage in the area.

== Geography ==
The lake is in Hall, Forsyth, Dawson, Gwinnett, and Lumpkin counties, split about 60%, 30%, 5%, 4%, and 1%, respectively, filling the valley into numerous small arms and fingers. The former thalweg of the Chestatee and the Chattahoochee south of it form the county line between Hall and a corner of Gwinnett to the east, and Dawson and Forsyth counties to the west. The land that now sits at the bottom of Lake Lanier was, before the 1950s, forest and farmland. Before the lake was completely filled, construction crews felled the treetops, leaving tall stumps to remain, in some areas, not far beneath the lake's surface.

One of the main purposes of the lake is flood control of the Chattahoochee River downstream, mainly protecting metro Atlanta. Since the construction of Buford Dam, only three major flooding events have occurred on the downstream section. The most severe flooding event was in 2009, following a two-year drought; the most recent was in 2013.

== Prior history ==
Prior to the construction of the reservoir in March of 1950, the town of Oscarville occupied a part of the current location of the lake. Oscarville was a small Black community and the site of a racial expulsion, resulting in the forced displacement, after a series of violent events, of all 1,098 black residents from Forsyth County by the white residents in 1912. Following the alleged assault of two white women and the subsequent lynching of a Black man named Rob Edwards who was accused of being involved in the crime, white mobs terrorized black families through arson, intimidation, and property destruction. Within weeks, nearly all Black residents fled Forsyth county abandoning their homes and property that were later absorbed into white ownership. Decades later, the remnants of the town were purchased by the government and flooded to create the lake.

== Reservoir ==
The lake's original purposes purportedly were to provide hydroelectricity, navigation, and flood control of the Chattahoochee River, and water supply for the city of Atlanta.

The project was authorized by Congress in 1946, and ground was broken on the Buford Dam on March 1, 1950. A stretch of Georgia Highway 53 that ran too close to the planned shoreline had to be abandoned. Gainesville's Looper Speedway was also condemned and abandoned.

More than $2 million (equivalent to $25 million in 2026) had been spent by the Corps on preliminary construction when the House Committee on Appropriations refused to provide more funds in June 1951. During that summer Atlanta mayor William Hartsfield traveled to Washington numerous times pressing southern Democratic Senators Richard Russell Jr. and Walter F. George to restore funding to ensure Atlanta's water supply during droughts. Hartsfield returned to Washington in 1955 to lobby for $11 million (equivalent to $97 million in 2024) more for the dam, which had a target completion date of 1956, again stressing the importance of an adequate water supply for his growing city. Congress approved the funds, and the dam was completed and opened on schedule.

On February 1, 1956, Lake Lanier began filling when the sluice gates of Buford Dam were closed. The dam began operation between June and October 1957, and that same year, Morgan Falls Dam, located 20 miles (32 km) downstream, was raised to regulate the flow from Buford Dam and regulate the flow of water to Atlanta. Buford Dam was dedicated on October 9, 1957, in a ceremony officiated by a number of elected officials, including U.S. Senator Richard B. Russell, Georgia Governor Marvin Griffin, and Atlanta mayor William B. Hartsfield. Lake Lanier reached its intended full-pool level on August 1, 1958, approximately one year later than initially expected due to droughts. In early fall of 1958, the region had two solid months of drought, which would have left the Chattahoochee and its tributaries nearly dry, if not for the construction of Buford Dam and the reserve of Lake Lanier.

Since the 1990s, the Corps of Engineers and the states of Florida, Georgia, and Alabama have all been fighting for use of the water held in Lake Lanier. Federal law mandates that when a river flows between two or more states, each state has a right to an equal share of the water. Additionally, laws such as the Endangered Species Act require that water be available to preserve and support the threatened or endangered species that live in or around the Chattahoochee River and Apalachicola Bay.

According to the Army Corps of Engineers, the dam has a current installed capacity of 126 megawatts and a hydraulic head of 136 feet.

In 2011 and 2012, the water fell to some of the lowest points on record set during the 2007 droughts. In the spring and summer of 2013, the water level reached some of the highest points due to high amounts of rain and flooding in the north Georgia area. By late June 2016, the southern parts of Forsyth County were having severe drought, and water use was ordered to be reduced.

=== Drought (2007–2009) ===
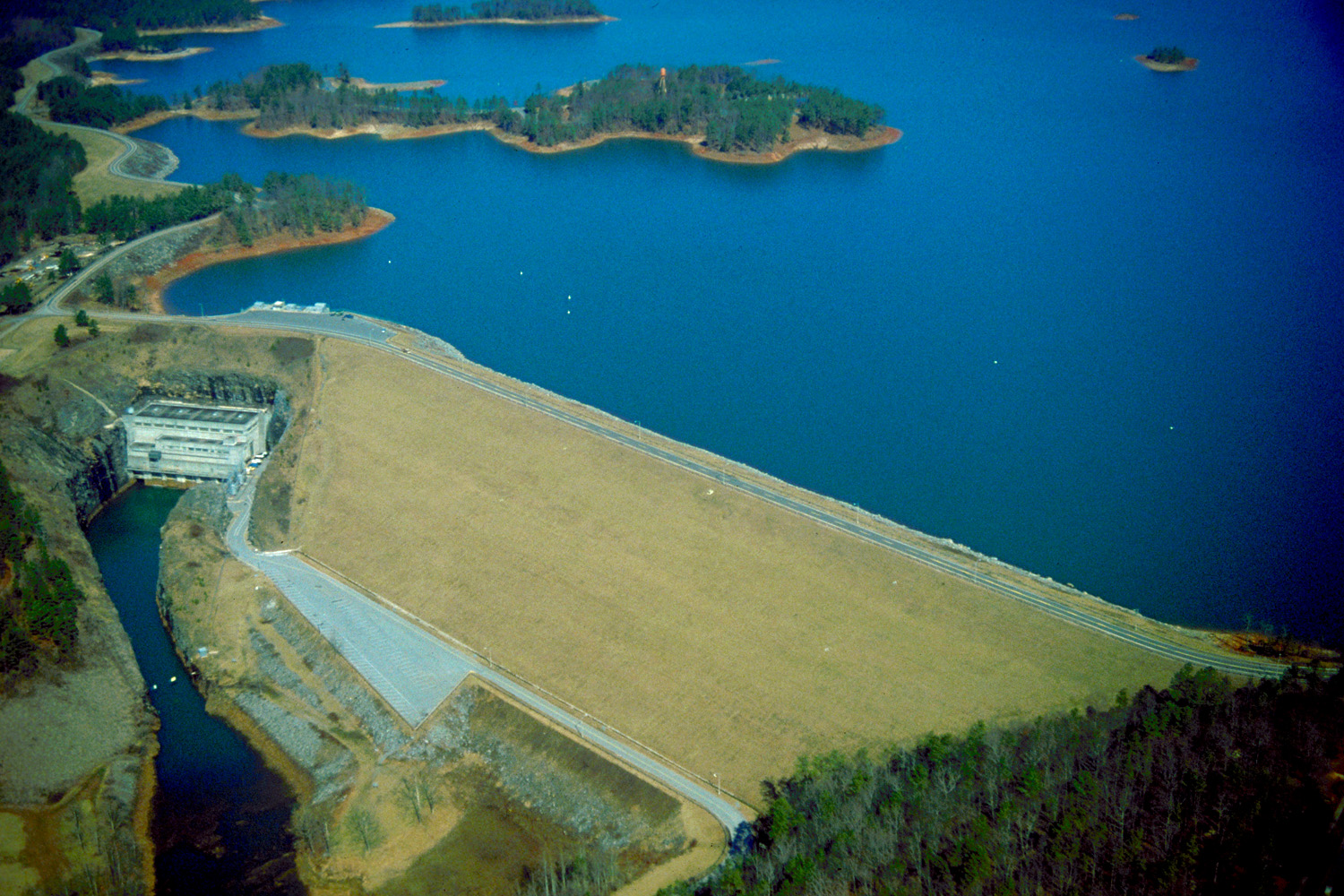
Buford Dam, impounding Lake Lanier on the Chattahoochee River in Forsyth County, Georgia

In June 2006, the USACE revealed that the new lake gauge at the dam, replaced in December 2005, was not properly calibrated, yielding a lake level reading nearly two feet (over half a meter) higher than the actual level. Because of this, nearly 22 billion U.S. gallons (over 82 billion liters) of excess water had been released. This was above the already planned excess releases to support the successful spawning of gulf sturgeon in the Apalachicola River and to protect several species of oysters in Apalachicola Bay from excessive saltwater intrusion.

Georgia Governor Sonny Perdue said that the Corps had created a "manmade drought", because most of the state was already having dry conditions. This came at a time when outdoor water-use restrictions were being put in place by local governments. The high rate of suburban growth in the area resulted in a high rate of water consumption to care for the many lawns which had replaced forests. Because of the error in managing Lake Lanier, the governor's office declared a drought and enacted a ban on outdoor water use from 10 am to 4 pm, in addition to the permanent weekly odd/even address system. Other local counties imposed further restrictions or total bans, based on each water system's conditions. Outdoor watering was banned completely as the state suffered the worst drought in its recorded history.

On October 16, 2007, Governor Perdue gave the USACE until the evening of October 17 to come up with a plan for the continued release of water for Florida wildlife. Senator Johnny Isakson stood before the Georgia General Assembly saying, "The health, safety and welfare of people are threatened. They are threatened by an act this Congress passed that had no intention to threaten them." He eventually withdrew his threat to sue the Corps of Engineers, but the Lake Lanier Association indicated that it would file a private legal action. Governor Perdue's attempts to reach an agreement with Florida over water releases fell through, leaving the final decision on releases from the lake to be made by the U.S. Fish and Wildlife Service.

Lake Lanier northeast of Atlanta

On November 22, 2007, the water level was at 1,052.34 ft (320.75 m), setting a new record low. The previous low was 1,052.7 ft (320.9 m), set in December 1981. One month later, the water level stabilized around a final low of 1,050.79 ft (320.28 m), recorded December 26, 2007 at Buford Dam. The day after Christmas, the water level began rising from week to week.

Eventually, after winter rains, on February 18, 2008, the water level of Lake Lanier rose to 1,052.80 ft (320.89 m), higher than the December 1981 level of 1,052.7 ft (320.9 m), effectively ending the record-low phase of the drought crisis.

A similar drought situation occurred in late 2008. At the end of the year, the water level stabilized around a final low of 1,051.00 ft (320.34 m), recorded December 8, 2008, at Buford Dam, slightly above the record set in 2007.

After rainfall during the winter of 2008–2009, on March 30, 2009, the climatologist of the state of Georgia, David Stooksbury, declared the drought over, noting: "soil moisture is near normal, stream flows are near normal. Small and medium-sized reservoirs are full." Stooksbury continued, "There is still the 500-pound gorilla sitting in the room and that's Lanier." In May 2009, the water level of Lake Lanier rose to exceed 1,066 ft (325 m), reaching a high of 1,066.71 ft (325.13 m) in mid-June 2009. It did not reach the full summer pool of 1,071 ft (326 m) during mid-2009, remaining more than 4 ft (1.2 m) lower. Following weeks of heavy rain in North Georgia, Lake Lanier returned to full pool in mid-October 2009. The record high is 1,077.2 ft (328.3 m) set in April 1964.

The record-low lake levels had revealed parts of the lake bottom not seen since the lake was created in the 1950s, including remnants of a road and foundations of homes that had to be abandoned for the construction. More recent additions to the lake—including discarded trash, boat batteries, and sunken boats—were discovered. Local efforts were organized to clean up the lake bottom. Several automobiles, some stolen, and discarded firearms were also recovered by law enforcement officials.

== Lawsuits ==
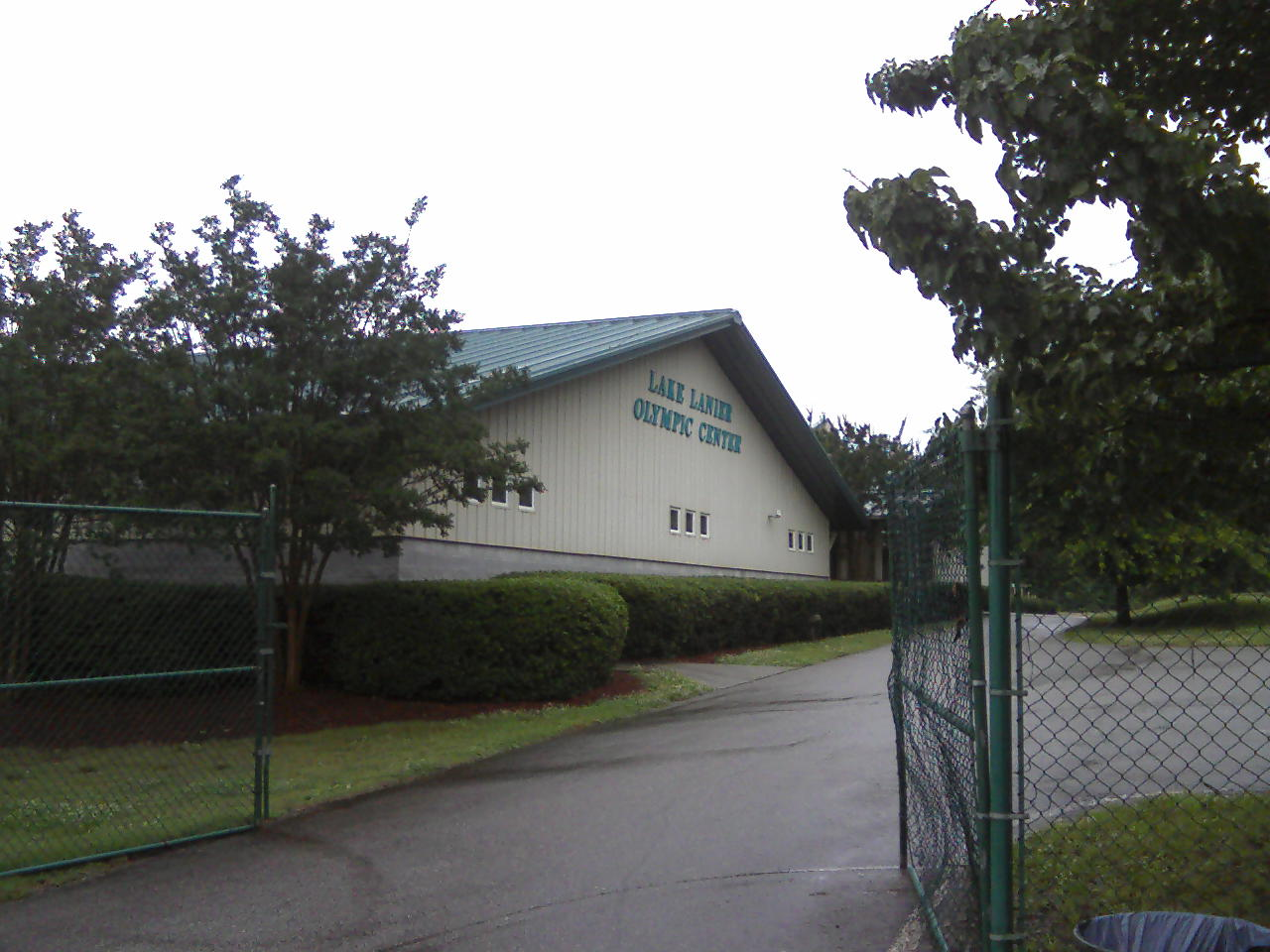
The Lake Lanier Olympic Park hosted the canoe sprint and rowing competitions for the 1996 Summer Olympics, the 2003 ICF Canoe Sprint World Championships, 2016 Pan American Sprint Canoe/Kayak Championships and the ICF Dragon Boat World Championships in 2018. This picture was taken in 2010.

In July 2009, a federal judge from Minnesota (chosen from a neutral location as an arbiter) ruled that Congress never authorized Lake Lanier to be used as a source of the water supply for metro Atlanta. Georgia was given three years to stop withdrawing from the lake (except for the adjacent cities of Gainesville and Buford), unless Congress authorized it, or if it and the other two states using water from the reservoir came to an agreement about use. The Atlanta Regional Commission chairman noted that if enforced, cutting drinking water to 75% of current users in the region would require disaster aid from the Federal Emergency Management Agency (FEMA).

In June 2011, the Eleventh Circuit Court of Appeals reversed the 2009 district court decision and confirmed the USACE's authority to regulate Lake Lanier for Atlanta's water supply. The Corps responded in June 2012 with plans for further analysis and evaluation of proposals from the three states.

In 2013, Florida filed an original action against Georgia in the Supreme Court of the United States, requesting equitable apportionment of waters in the ACF Basin. On November 3, 2014, the Supreme Court granted Florida leave to file the complaint. On April 1, 2021, the Supreme Court dismissed the complaint in a unanimous opinion, holding that Florida did not prove any serious injury caused by Georgia.

== Naming controversy and renaming efforts ==
The lake is named after the 19th-century poet Sidney Lanier, for his poem "Song of the Chattahoochee," which is written about the nearby Chattahoochee River. In addition to being a poet, Lanier also served time in the Confederate Army, which has made the Lake's name subject to public debate and renaming controversies. In 2021, the United States Congress directed a commission to remove any names or titles related to the Confederate Army from all Department of Defense property, which includes the U.S. Army Corps of Engineers, the agency responsible for managing Lake Lanier. In 2023, the Lake Lanier Association notified the public that it would not be changing the name of the lake.

== Recreation ==
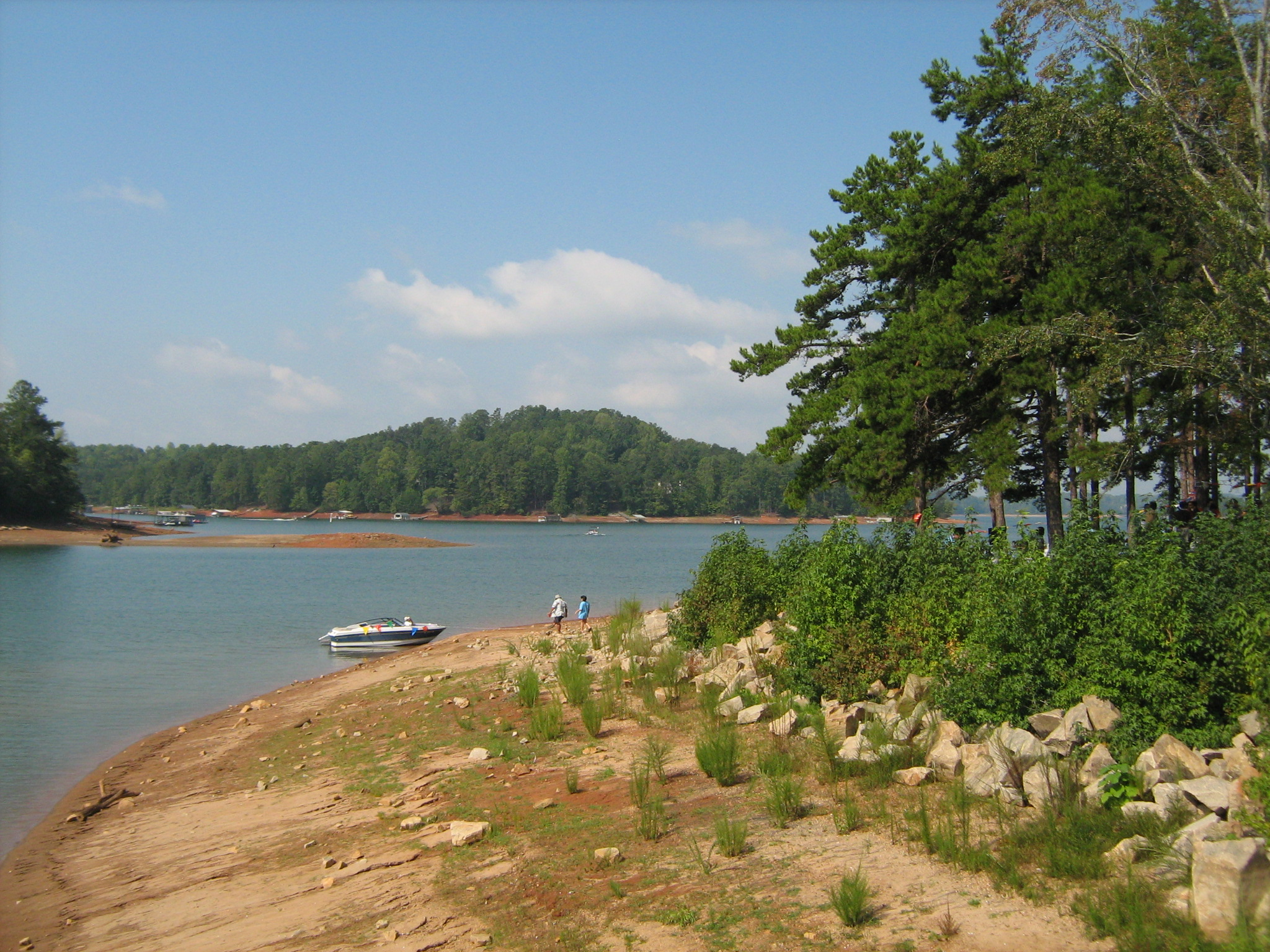
Lake Lanier at River Forks Park in Gainesville during a time of lower-than-average water levels

The lake is popular with boaters, houseboats, jet-skiers, and others, particularly around the summer holidays. Over 10 million people visit the lake annually, including its marinas and the Lake Lanier Islands waterpark. The rowing and sprint canoeing events during the 1996 Summer Olympics were held on the north end of the lake. It has since hosted many international events such as the 2003 ICF Canoe Sprint World Championships, the 2016 Pan American Sprint Canoe/Kayak Championships, and the 2018 ICF Dragon Boat World Championships. The venue is host to many other events such as Food Truck Friday, ACRA Championships, and the Atlanta Hong Kong Dragon Boat Festival.

Lake Lanier has over 90 corps, state, county, and city parks spread around its 680 miles of shoreline, 23 of which provide swim beaches. All of these parks are accessible by land and some by water, and most have other amenities such as picnic areas, restrooms, boat ramps, and playgrounds. There are also dozens of beaches on islands located all over Lake Lanier.

Lake Lanier Islands is a resort complex on the lake, opened in 1974, that includes a resort hotel called Legacy Lodge (formerly Emerald Pointe Hotel), a water park, and a golf course, among other amenities. The complex also included a second resort hotel, PineIsle, which operated from 1975 to 2005, and was demolished in 2008. Both hotels were sold by CNL Hotels & Resorts, a hotel investment firm in Florida, to Georgia businessman Virgil Williams. In 2017–2018, Margaritaville was announced to take over Lanier Islands Park. Lake Lanier Islands sits on a ground lease from the Lake Lanier Islands Development Authority, which was established by the Georgia General Assembly in 1962 to promote tourism development on the islands, and in turn leases the land from the U.S. Army Corps of Engineers.

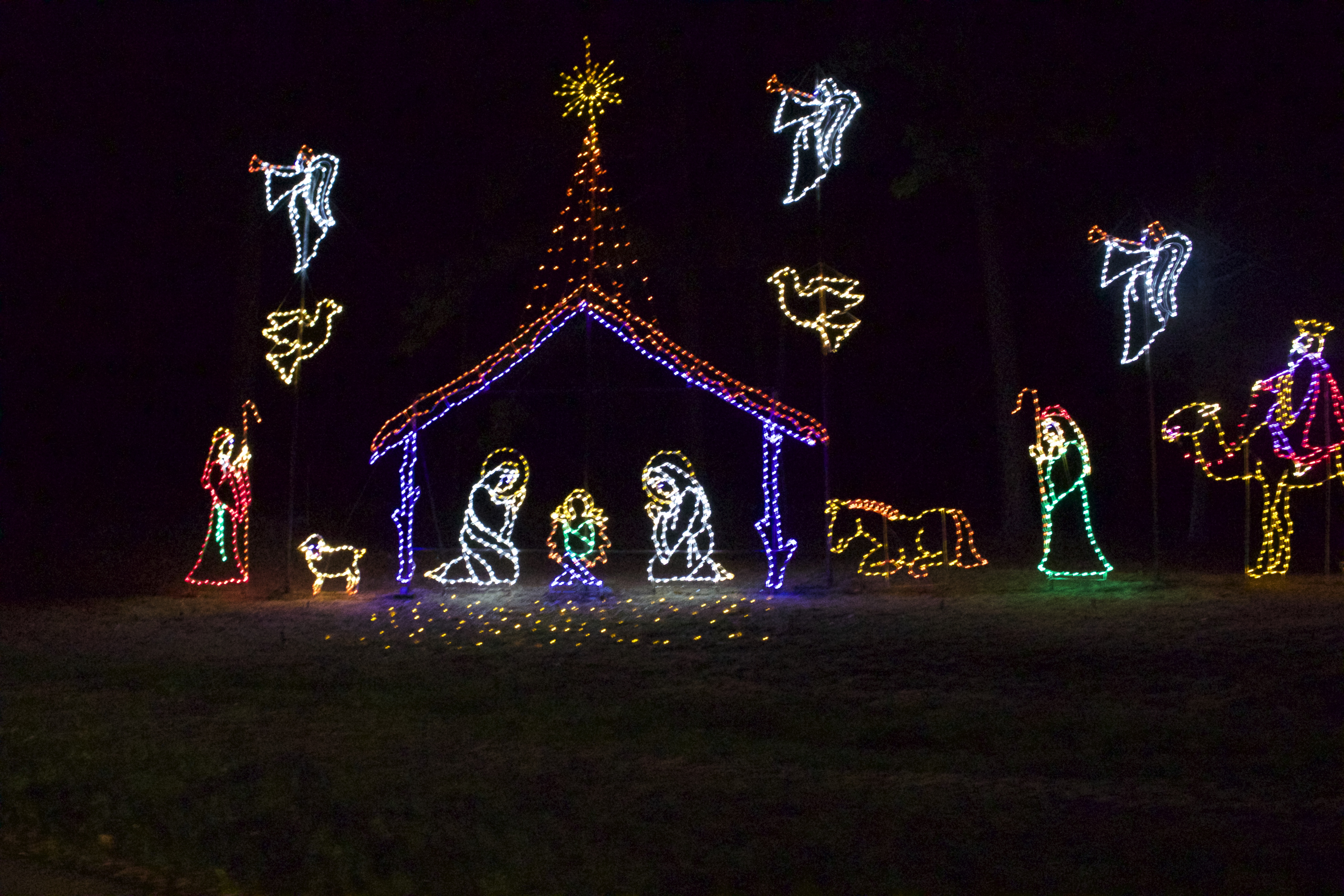
Led lights displayed in December.

Every year from mid-November through January, Lake Lanier Islands are decorated with over 6 mi (9.7 km) of Christmas lights, the largest animated light show in the southeast and one of the world's largest light shows. Lake Lanier Islands hosts a winter holiday light display called Magical Nights of Lights, which includes animated lights, a Christmas-themed village area, carnival rides, and other seasonal attractions.

Local folklore includes stories about the lake being haunted, connected to the cemeteries that were submerged during its creation.
