= Buford Dam =

Dam in Buford, Georgia, U.S.

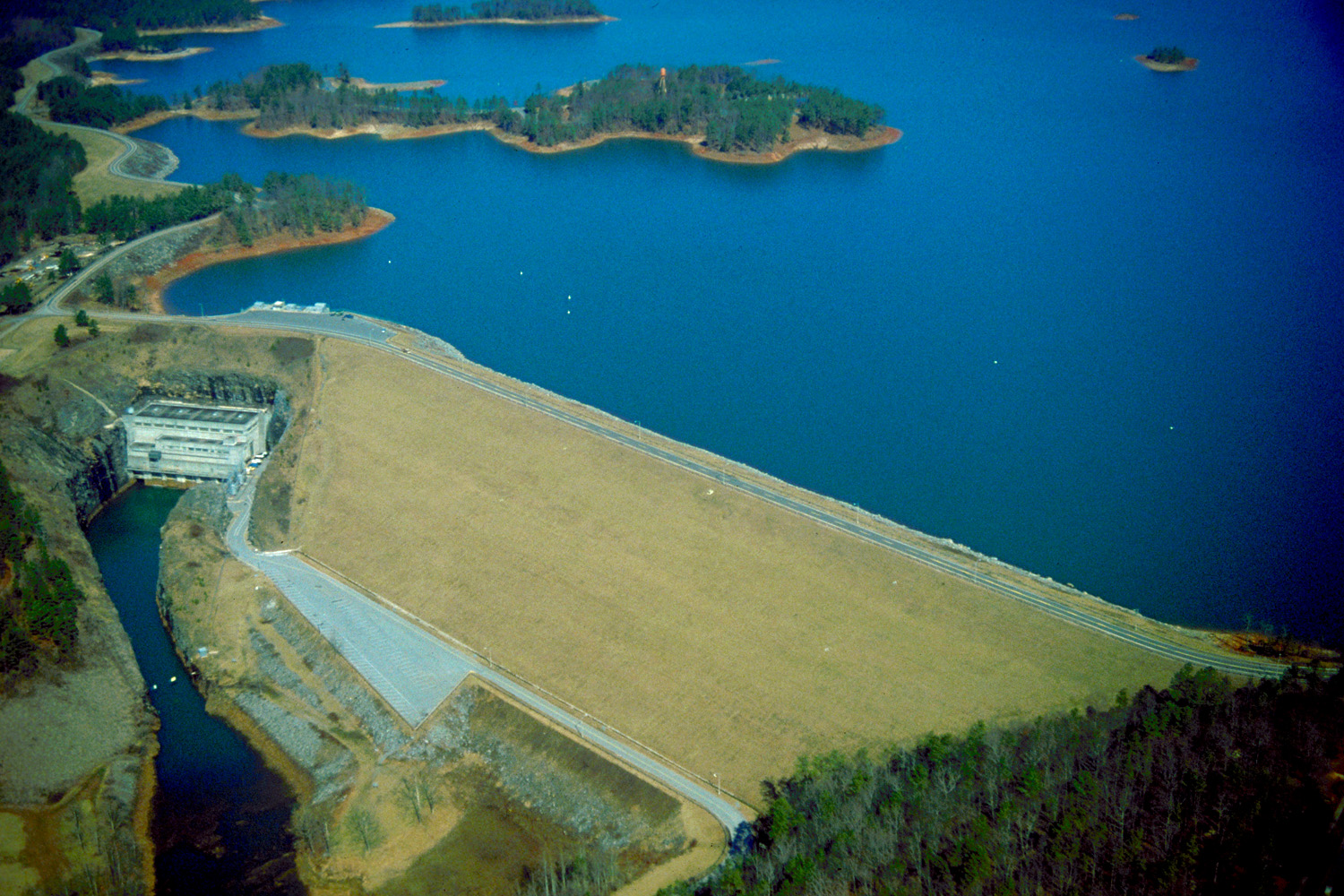

- Location within Georgia Location within the United States
- Country: United States
- Location: Buford, Georgia
- Coordinates: 34°09′37″N 84°04′26″W
- Purpose: Multi-purpose
- Status: Operational
- Construction began: March 1, 1950; 76 years ago
- Opening date: October 9, 1957; 69 years ago
- Operator: United States Army Corps of Engineers

Dam and spillways
- Type of dam: Earth fill dam
- Impounds: Chattahoochee River
- Height (thalweg): 192 ft (59 m)
- Length: 1,630 ft (500 m)
- Width (crest): 40 ft (12 m)
- Width (base): 1,000 ft (300 m)
- Spillways: 1
- Spillway type: Uncontrolled chute

Reservoir
- Creates: Lake Lanier

Power Station
- Commission date: 1958; 68 years ago
- Annual generation: 250 GWh

Buford Dam is a dam in Buford, Georgia which is located at the southern end of Lake Lanier, a reservoir formed by the construction of the dam in 1956. The dam itself is managed by the United States Army Corps of Engineers.

The dam is made of earth and concrete, supplemented by three saddle dikes, and was built to provide a water source for the Atlanta area, power homes, and prevent flooding of the Chattahoochee River.

Electricity from the dam is marketed by the Southeastern Power Administration.

== Construction ==
Congress authorized construction of the dam in 1946, and in 1949 the federal government gave the State of Georgia $750,000 (equivalent to $10,036,307 in 2025) towards the building of the dam and accompanying powerhouse.

On March 1, 1950, a groundbreaking ceremony was held, which included dignitaries such as Atlanta mayor William B. Hartsfield. The United States Army Corps of Engineers oversaw the construction of the dam.

During construction, land was bought in the area that would become the reservoir. Homes, churches, graveyards, and all other structures that would float were removed or burned. Many residents in the reservoir area fought the buying of their homes with unsuccessful civil lawsuits.

The powerhouse required crews to use dynamite to blast a U-shaped space through granite rock structures to hollow out an area for the powerhouse and release gates. During the construction of the dam, Johnnie Callahan died during a rockslide when cutting an intake tunnel into the face of the granite rock wall.

On February 1, 1956, the dam was completed when the sluice gates were closed and Lake Lanier began to fill. Unit 2 began operation on June 20, 1957, Unit 3 on July 26, 1957, and Unit 1 on October 10, 1957. The dam was dedicated on October 9, 1957. The power plant went into full-scale operation in July 1958, and the lake reached its intended level on August 1 of that year.

== Operation ==
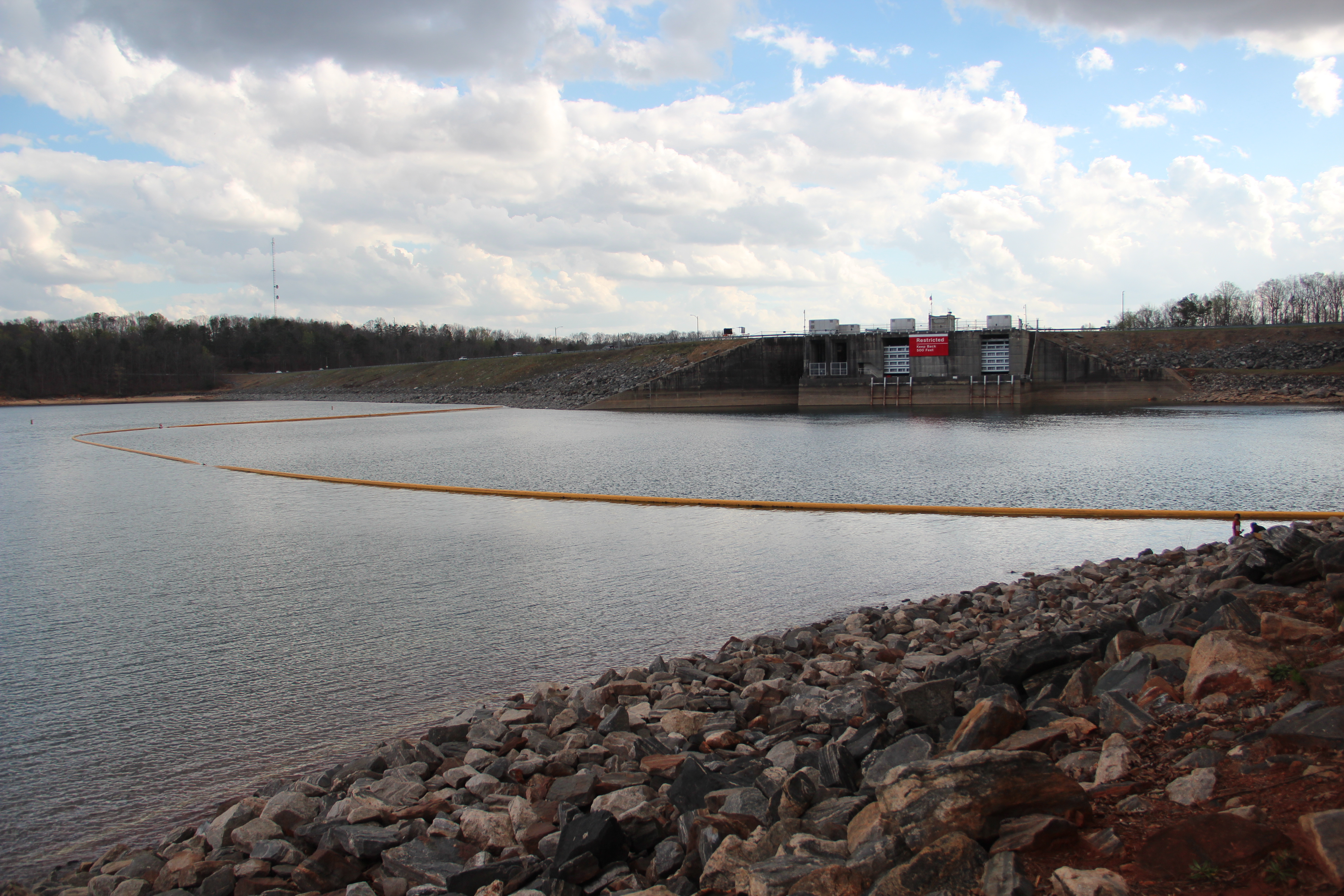
The intake structure

When water is released from the dam's turbines, several sirens sound as well as an AM warning broadcast.

The dam also has a 13.25 ft (4.04 m) diameter sluice which can be used to allow water to bypass the turbines.

Downriver from the dam is a trout breeding hatchery, which is one of the southernmost hatcheries for trout, due to the cool temperature of the water that the dam releases.

=== Powerhouse ===
The powerhouse at the dam has three generators: the main generator, a small 7.5 megawatt generator which runs constantly, and two 60 megawatt generators that run twice daily during times of peak electricity demand. The powerhouse provides 250 GWh (900 TJ) of electricity annually to the metro Atlanta area. Control of the Buford Dam generators is done remotely from Carters Dam near Ellijay, Georgia via a microwave signal. The power generated is delivered to Georgia Power.

The powerhouse is cooled by the temperature of the water running through the dam, which is approximately 52 °F (11 °C) year-round.

In 2002, the US Army Corps of Engineers spent $8.5 million to provide upgrades to the powerhouse.

=== Goats ===
Because the earthen slopes on the outer side of the dam exceed 40% grade (21.8°, 1 in 2.5) and contain rocks and drop-off points, they are too steep and unsafe to be practically maintained by a landscaping crew. To address this, the US Army Corps of Engineers use goats to maintain the grass and vegetation on the slope as it is more economically viable than alternatives. Goats have been used since the 1970s for this purpose, and there are sixteen goats that maintain the grounds, known as the "Chew Crew". There is also a donkey onsite that is used to protect the goats from coyotes.
