= DeVotie =

DeVotie is a surname. Notable people with the surname include:

- James H. DeVotie (1814–1891), Baptist minister, Confederate chaplain and co-founder of Samford University
- Noble Leslie DeVotie (1838–1861), Baptist minister, Confederate chaplain and co-founder of Sigma Alpha Epsilon
