= Thomas E. Corts =

American university president (1941–2009)

Coordinates: 33.46570°N 86.79214°W

Thomas Edward Corts (1941–2009) was an American university president. He served as President of Wingate College in North Carolina from 1974 to 1983, and the 17th President of Samford University in Birmingham, Alabama from 1983 to 2006.

== Biography ==
Corts was born in Terre Haute, Indiana in 1941. to Charles and Hazel Corts. He grew up in Ashtabula, Ohio and graduated from Ashtabula High School. He graduated from Georgetown College in Kentucky, and received an M.A. and a PhD from Indiana University Bloomington. Under the guidance of his mentor Robert Lee Mills, then President of Georgetown, he served as Executive Vice President there. From 1974 to 1983 he was President of Wingate College (now Wingate University.) From 1983 to 2006, he served as President of Samford University.

He served as the President of the Southern Association of Colleges and Schools, the American Association of Presidents of Independent Colleges and Universities, the National Fellowship of Baptist Educators, the Association of Southern Baptist Colleges and Schools, and Alabama Citizens for Constitutional Reform. He is a member of the Alabama Academy of Honor.

After retiring from Samford, he served in 2006 and 2007 as interim chancellor of Alabama's two-year college system. In 2007 he was named by President George W. Bush coordinator of The President's Initiative to Expand Education and then as Coordinator of Basic Education in the Office of the Director of Foreign Assistance, U.S. State Department.

He died in 2009.

Academic offices
Preceded by Leslie Stephen Wright	Samford University Presidents; 1983–2006	Succeeded by Andrew Westmoreland
