= Julia Tarrant Barron =

American philanthropist (1805–1890)

- Born: Julia Ann Tarrant; December 18, 1805; Abbeville, South Carolina
- Died: February 5, 1890 (aged 84); Marion, Alabama
- Occupation: philanthropist
- Years active: 1832-1889
- Known for: founding Judson College, Stamford University and The Alabama Baptist newspaper

Julia Tarrant Barron (1805–1890) was a founder of Judson College in Marion, Alabama, and Howard College, renamed subsequently to Samford University now located in Homewood, Alabama. She also co-founded The Alabama Baptist newspaper with pastor Milo P. Jewett and donated the land for the construction of the Siloam Baptist Church. She was posthumously inducted into the Alabama Women's Hall of Fame.

== Biography ==
Julia Ann Tarrant was born on December 18, 1805, in Abbeville, South Carolina, but her family moved in the mid-1810s to Alabama Territory before statehood settling in Elyton. She married the merchant and plantation owner, William C. Barron, in 1828 and the following year, their only child, John Thomas Barron was born. William died within 4 years of their marriage in 1832, leaving Barron "one of the wealthiest women in Marion". She chose not to continue the mercantile business, but continued with the plantation. She owned thirty-five slaves and invested in several businesses, buying multiple city lots. During her years of prosperity, she donated the land on which Siloam Baptist Church was erected and funded other philanthropic ventures.

In 1838, Barron invited several local Baptist leaders including Edwin D. King, a trustee of the University of Alabama; James DeVotie, her pastor at Siloam Church; and Milo P. Jewett, who would become the school's first president, to her home to organize a Baptist girls' school. She rented a building for the Judson Female Institute, as it was initially known, and provided lodging for the newly appointed school president and his wife. The school opened in 1839 and Julia’s son, John Thomas, was allowed to enroll with the other eight female students. In 1841, when Judson was expanded and built their first brick building, Barron provided the funds for the construction. That same year, when DeVotie proposed starting a men's college Barron became the first financial contributor to Howard College, donating $4,000 US toward establishing the school. Both she and her son gave land as well. Two years later, she helped found The Alabama Baptist newspaper with Jewett, who at that time had succeeded as the pastor of Siloam Church. Her son, who had transferred to the men's school, was the first graduate of Howard College in 1846 and would become a physician. When the college was damaged by fire, in 1854, both he and his mother assisted with funds and land for it to be reconstructed.

The family fortunes changed with the end of the Civil War and as early as 1863, Barron and her son were forced to sell their property to satisfy their creditors. Then John died in 1868 and his wife died in 1875, leaving an impoverished Barron to care for their two daughters.

She died on February 5, 1890, in Marion, Alabama. Posthumously, Barron's contributions were widely acknowledged. In 1945, her granddaughter, Olive Barron Becker, was asked by Howard College to paint a portrait of Barron for the school. It was dedicated in 1946 and hangs in the Samford Library. She was inducted into the Alabama Women's Hall of Fame in 1991, the largest residence hall on the Judson College campus was named in her honor, and in 2008 a commemorative project of the Selma, Alabama, chapter of the Daughters of the American Revolution honored Barron as a woman whose contributions to Alabama helped both the state and the nation.

== Bibliography ==
- Flynt, Wayne (1998). Alabama Baptists: Southern Baptists in the Heart of Dixie. Tuscaloosa, Alabama: University of Alabama Press. ISBN 978-0-8173-0927-5.
