= Noble Leslie DeVotie =

American Baptist minister and chaplain (1838–1861)

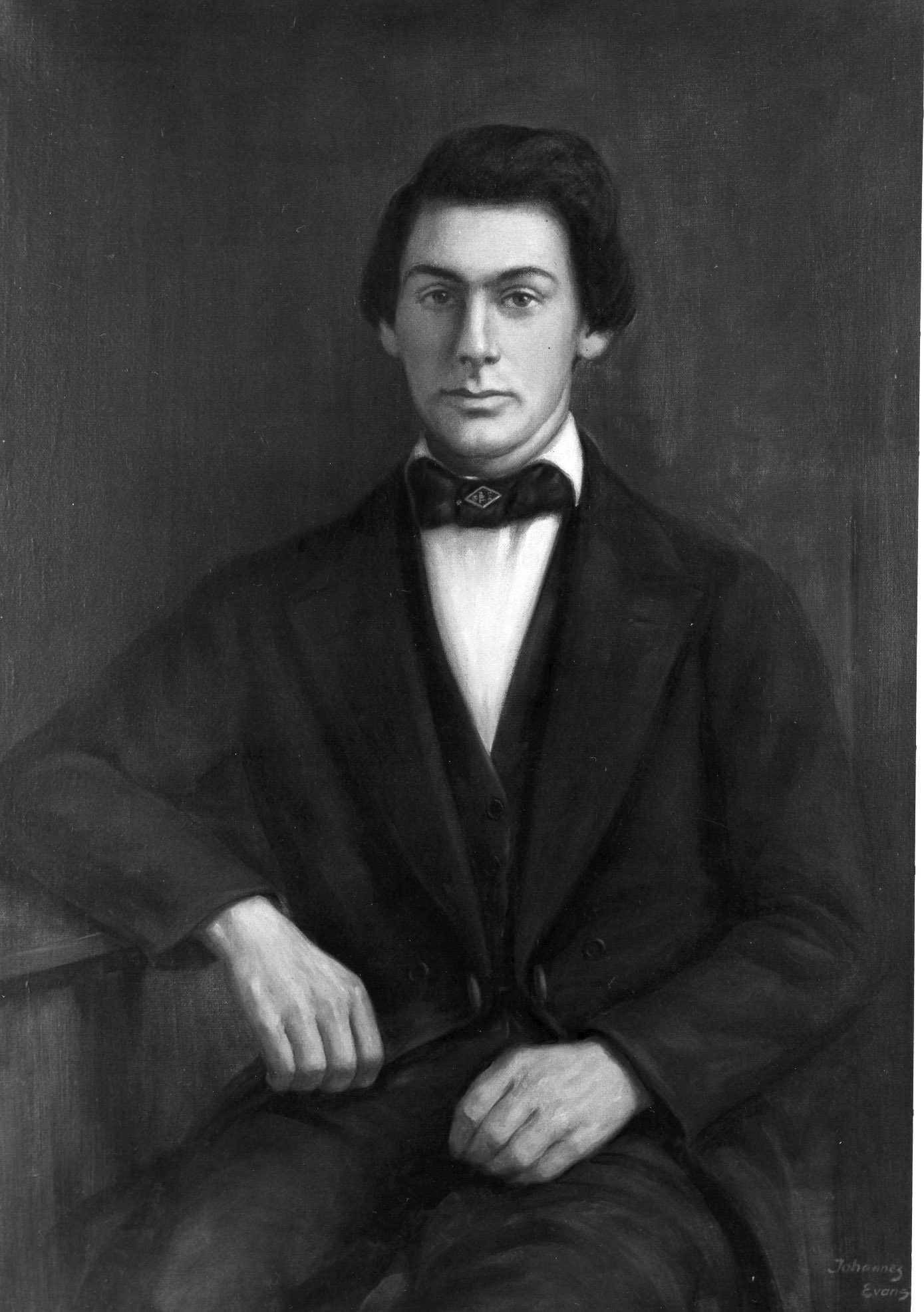
- Born: January 24, 1838; Tuscaloosa, Alabama
- Died: February 12, 1861 (aged 23); Fort Morgan, Alabama
- Resting place: Linwood Cemetery
- Education: Princeton Theological Seminary; University of Alabama
- Occupation: Pastor
- Parent(s): James H. DeVotie; Margaret Noble DeVotie
- Military career
- Allegiance: Confederate States of America (1861)
- Branch: Confederate States Army
- Service years: 1861
- Rank: Chaplain

Noble Leslie DeVotie (January 24, 1838 – February 12, 1861) was a Baptist minister, Confederate chaplain, and the lead founder of Sigma Alpha Epsilon, a national fraternity.

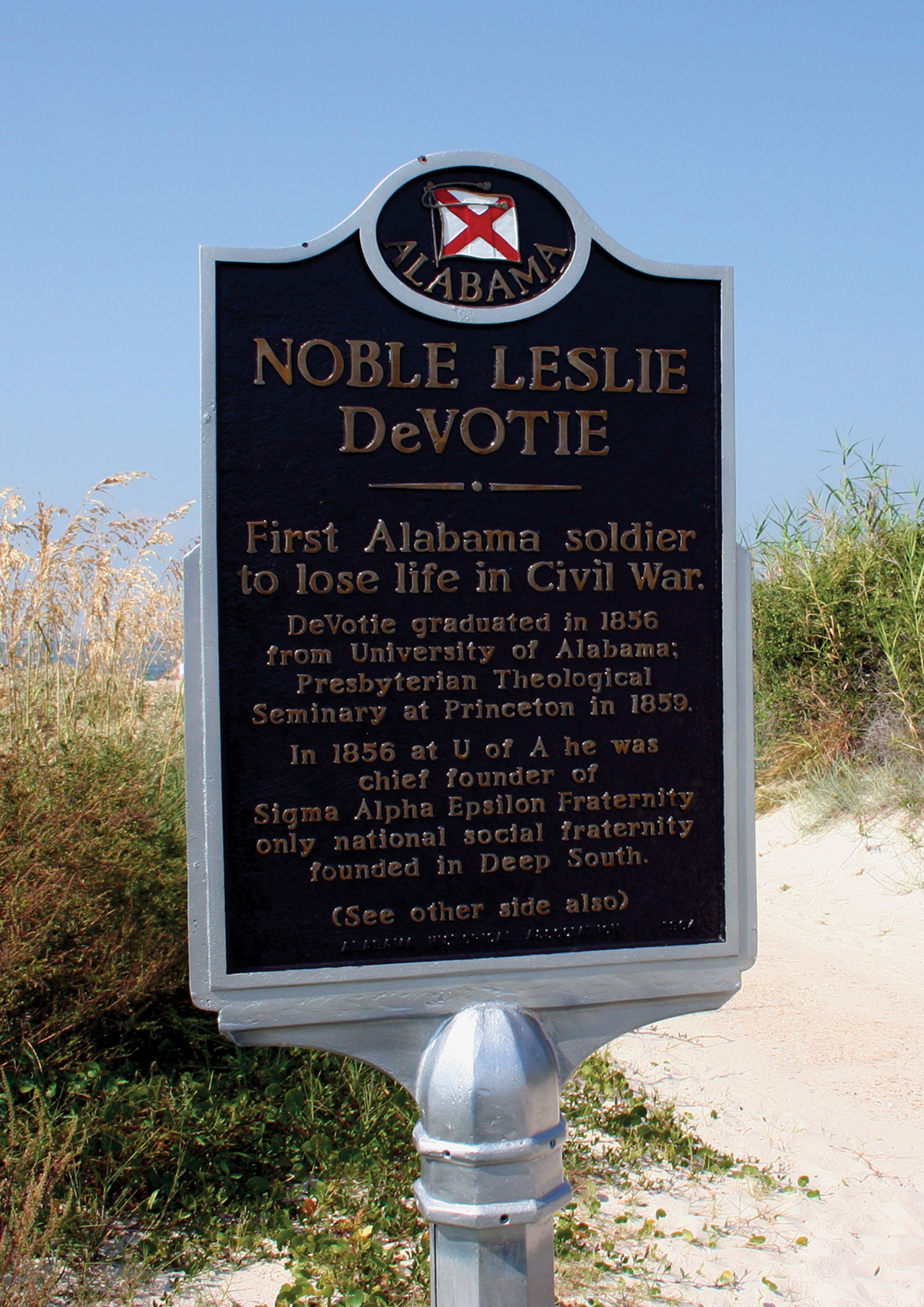
Historical marker about Noble Leslie DeVotie at Fort Morgan.

== Early life ==
Noble Leslie DeVotie was born on January 24, 1838, in Tuscaloosa, Alabama. His father, Dr. James H. DeVotie, was the pastor of Siloam Baptist Church in Marion, Alabama and later the First Baptist Church of Columbus, Georgia. His mother was Margaret Noble DeVotie. He had a brother, Howard DeVotie. DeVotie was baptized in the Baptist faith by his father at Siloam Baptist Church when he was eleven years old.

DeVotie first attended Howard College, later known as Samford University, before transferring to the University of Alabama. He graduated in 1856. While there, he co-founded Sigma Alpha Epsilon at the age of eighteen. He then studied Christian Theology at the Princeton Theological Seminary in Princeton, New Jersey for three years.

== Career ==
He was ordained as a Baptist pastor in Selma, Alabama in November 1859. He served as pastor at the (now demolished) First Baptist Church of Selma, built in 1850 and located on the corner of Church Street and Alabama Avenue.

In the lead up to the American Civil War as Abraham Lincoln became the President-Elect and the secession crisis occurred, he joined the Confederate States Army as a chaplain. Many of his young male congregants had joined the CSA. He was stationed at Fort Morgan near Mobile, where he pastored many of his former congregants. He also pastored the Independent Blues and Governor's Guards, two Confederate companies from Selma.

== Death ==
He drowned on February 12, 1861. As he was about to board a steamer at Fort Morgan, he made a misstep and drowned. He was buried at Linwood Cemetery in Columbus, Georgia. His funeral was conducted by Isaac T. Tichenor, with a sermon by Basil Manly, Sr.

DeVotie was the first Alabama soldier to die in the Civil War.
