= Alabama Academy of Honor =

Honor for Alabamians

The Alabama Academy of Honor recognizes one hundred living Alabamians for outstanding accomplishments and services to Alabama and the United States. By act of the Alabama Legislature, only one hundred living people may be members at any time. Up to ten additional members per year are elected by current members when honorees pass away, by majority vote in order of highest vote total. Any Alabama citizen or Academy member may nominate people for election. Living present and past governors of Alabama are automatically members of the Academy and do not count against the 100-person maximum. At any time, no more than twenty-five percent of the Academy's members may be politicians.

Supreme Court Justice Hugo Black was the only person to ever decline membership in the Academy, after a vow to refuse all honors.

== Establishment ==
The Alabama Academy of Honor was created by the Alabama State Legislature on October 29, 1965, through Act 15 of the Third Special Session of the 1965 Legislature of Alabama. The Academy was intended to honor notable living Alabama citizens, since several organizations already existed in the state for posthumous recognition.

On March 10, 1965, Missouri native and Alabama citizen Emmett Bryan Carmichael wrote to Alabama Governor George C. Wallace to suggest modeling an Academy after Missouri's "Academy of Squires". The idea was postponed until Governor Albert P. Brewer revived interest in the legislation. On October 25, 1968, a committee appointed by Governor Brewer and chaired by Emmett Carmichael selected the first ten members (as well as four governors). On a somewhat annual basis, later elections selected several new Alabamians until the 100-person cap was reached.

== Members by election year ==
=== 2025 ===
Bernard LaFayette Jr. - Civil rights activist with the Southern Christian Leadership Conference, and the national coordinator for the Poor People’s Campaign in 1968

Sandy Stimpson - Executive vice-president of Scotch and Gulf Lumber, three terms as mayor of Mobile; board member of Business Council of Alabama, the Mobile Area Chamber of Commerce and the Alabama Policy Institute; and a founding member of the Partners for Environmental Progress, and Prichard Preparatory School

Ray Watts - Longest-serving president of the University of Alabama at Birmingham

=== 2020 ===
Jo Bonner---U.S. Congressman, 1st District of Alabama, 2003-2013

J. Gary Cooper----U.S. Ambassador to Jamaica, 1994-1997

Bryan Stevenson----Human rights advocate, founder of Equal Justice Initiative

=== 2019 ===
No inductees

=== 2018 ===
Walter Bell----banker, Alabama Insurance Commissioner

U. W. Clemon----1st African-American Federal judge in Alabama

Ann Florie-----public servant

D. Paul Jones, Jr.------banker

Stancil Starnes-------lawyer/insurance executive

=== 2017 ===
Kay Ivey----2nd female Governor of Alabama

Deborah Edwards Barnhart------CEO, Space and Rocket Center

Cynthia Tucker Haynes-------Journalist; 1st African-American editor of Atlanta Journal-Constitution

Cathy Sloss Jones------Real estate executive

=== 2016 ===
Jack Hawkins, Jr.-------Chancellor of Troy University

Claude Nielsen--------CEO, Coca-Cola

=== 2015 ===
Richard Arrington----1st African-American mayor of Birmingham, Alabama

Raymond Harbert------Investment firm chairman

Vincent "Bo" Jackson, Jr.------Sports legend (NFL/MLB)

Charles Krulak-----USMC general/business executive

Caroline Novak------Chairman of A+ Education Partnership

Randy Owen------Founding member of country music group ALABAMA

=== 2014 ===
Judy Bonner----1st female president of the University of Alabama

Tim Cook----businessman

John Croyle------businessman/football player

Jim Hudson, Jr.-------businessman

Margaret Porter-------Mayor of Mountain Brook, Alabama

Nick Saban-------head football coach, University of Alabama

Jeff Sessions--------U.S. Senator from Alabama, U.S. Attorney General

Edgar Weldon---------businessman

=== 2013 ===
Johnny Johns----businessman

Fournier J. "Boots" Gale III ----lawyer

Seth Hammett----businessman, college president, Alabama Speaker of the House

=== 2012 ===
Ralph Cook----lawyer

Jay Gogue------president of University of Auburn

Alice Lee-------sister of author Harper Lee; oldest practicing attorney in Alabama

Tommy Lowder------real estate

Beverly Phifer Wingard------business executive

James Stephens------business executive

=== 2011 ===
Robert Bentley------Governor of Alabama

Charles Anderson-----media executive, Books-A-Million

David Cooper----maritime business executive

John Denson II---lawyer

J.M. Jenkins IV----business executive

Barbara Larson----1st executive director of Leadership Alabama

John Lewis-----U.S. Representative, Georgia; civil rights advocate

Robert Witt-----president of University of Alabama

=== 2010 ===
John Buchanan------U.S. Rep., Alabama's 6th District

Elbert Drummond-----business executive

Carol Garrison-------president, University of Alabama Birmingham (UAB)

=== 2009 ===
Angus Cooper II------maritime business executive

Donald James------business executive

James Dean Martin-----U.S. Rep., Alabama's 7th District

Charles McCrary------chairman of Alabama Power

Frank Stitt--------renowned chef and cookbook author

=== 2008 ===
Vaughan Morrissette------civic leader/volunteerism advocate

William E. Smith, Jr.--------business executive

Odessa Woolfolk-------founder of Birmingham Civil Rights Institute

=== 2007 ===
Hank Aaron------sports legend (MLB); broke Babe Ruth's career homerun record

Leah Rawls Atkins-------educator/historian

Mike Goodrich------business executive

James Harrison, Jr.------pharmacist, founder and CEO of Harco, Inc. Drug Stores

=== 2006 ===
Regina Benjamin--------physician/Surgeon General of the United States

Miller Gorrie-------business executive

Bill Ireland-------business executive

Edwin Bridges-------director of Department of Archives and History

Wayne Flynt--------historian

=== 2005 ===
Fred Gray-------civil right attorney and legislator

Ted C. Kennedy------business executive

Richard Shelby------U.S. Senator from Alabama

Gail Trechsel------art museum director

=== 2004 ===
Bill Cabanis------U.S. Ambassador to the Czech Republic

Catherine Randall------educator

Hall Thompson------business executive/golf cart developer

Cameron Vowell------philanthropist

William Warren, Jr.------CEO, Children's of Alabama Hospital

=== 2003 ===
Bob Riley-----Governor of Alabama

Don Logan------business executive

Malcolm Portera-----education executive

Van Richey-------business executive

Kathryn Tucker Windham----author known for Jeffrey stories

=== 2002 ===
James Head------business executive/equal rights advocate

John Godbold------Federal judge, 11th Circuit Court of Appeals

George Murray-----civil rights advocate/Episcopal bishop/"Call To Unity"

Condoleezza Rice-----U.S. National Security Advisor/U.S. Secretary of State

Cordell Wynn------president of Stillman College

=== 2001 ===
Ann Reynolds-------president of UAB

Harper Lee---author of "To Kill A Mockingbird"

Sidney McDonald-----educator/legislator/business executive

Marvin Engel-----business executive

Thomas Meredith------education executive

=== 2000 ===
John McMahon, Jr.------business executive

William Muse-----president of Auburn

Sandral Hullett-----medical executive

Rosa Parks-----civil rights pioneer

=== 1999 ===
J. Mason Davis, Jr.------civil rights attorney

Drayton Nabers, Jr.-------insurance executive

Sabert Oglesby, Jr.-------pioneer in air pollution control

Don Siegleman-----Governor of Alabama

=== 1998 ===
Charles LeMaistre-------physician, chairman of M.D. Anderson Cancer Institute

Stanley Mackin-------bank executive

Lee Styslinger, Jr.-----business executive

Robert Weil-------business executive

=== 1997 ===
James Clark------mayor of Eufaula, Alabama/state legislator

Emory Folmar-----mayor of Montgomery, Alabama

Robert Luckie, Jr.-----advertising executive

Benjamin Russell-----timber executive

Herb Sklenar-----business executive

Larry Striplin------coach/athletic director, Belmont University

=== 1996 ===
Ann Bedsole----1st Republican female in Alabama House/1st female state senator

Thomas Bradford, Jr.------business executive

Frank Bromberg, Jr.------business executive

Alston Callahan-----pioneer in reconstructive eye surgery

Thomas Corts-----president of Samford University

Edward Friend III-----lawyer

William Spencer III------business executive

=== 1995 ===
Philip Austin-------education executive

Elton B. Stephens------business executive

E.O. Wilson--------ecology scientist

=== 1994 ===
No inductees

=== 1993 ===
David Bronner------CEO, Retirement System of Alabama

Tom Carruthers-----lawyer

James E. Folsom, Jr.-------Governor of Alabama

Elmer Harris-----CEO, Alabama Power

Earl Sayers------president, University of Alabama

=== 1992 ===
No inductees

1991

Harry Ayers-------Publisher, Anniston Star

Basil Hirschowitz------scientist, developed optical fiber for flexible endoscope

Barrett Shelton, Jr.-------newspaper executive

Bill Edmonds-----civil engineer, business executive

Frank Moody-----CEO, Alabama Power

Margaret Tutwiler-------noted U.S. State Department official

=== 1990 ===
Max Cooper----noted immunologist

Willard Hurley-----bank executive

Crawford Johnson III----CEO, Coca-Cola

James E. Martin----president of Auburn

Joseph Moquin-----business executive

=== 1989 ===
Houston Brice, Jr.-----business executive

Garry Drummond----business executive

Daniel McCall, Jr.-----Alabama State Supreme Court Justice

Holt Rast------business executive/state legislator

=== 1988 ===
Aaron Aronov------real estate developer

Carl Bailey-----CEO, South Central Bell

Eugene Gwaltney----business executive

Olin King-----business executive

Yetta Samford, Jr.------lawyer

James Wilson, Jr.----business executive

=== 1987 ===
Thomas Bartlett----educator, president of American University in Cairo

Claude Bennett----medical scientist/educator

Edward Friend, Jr.----corporate/real estate attorney

Guy Hunt------Governor of Alabama

Joseph Lanier, Jr.----business executive

James Lee, Jr.----business executive/CEO, Buffalo Rock

Ernest Williams----paper industry executive

=== 1986 ===
- Tom Bevill (1921-2005)---U.S. Representative (4th & 7th districts) of Alabama (1967-1997)
- Dr. Ira Lee Myers (1924-2008)---Alabama State Health Officer (1963-1986)
- Louis J. Willie, Jr. (1923-2007)---Insurance executive
- Wallace Davis Malone, Jr. (1936- )----CEO SouthTrust Bank
- Thomas Edward Rast (1920-2003)----Real estate executive

=== 1985 ===
- Joseph Sam Bruno (1912-1996)----Founder of Bruno's grocery store chain
- Emil Carl Hess (1918-?)----owner of the Parisian apparel chain
- William Jackson Edwards, III (1928- )---U.S. Representative (1st District), from AL (1965-1985); 1st Republican from this district since Reconstruction Era.
- William David Sellers, Jr. (1913-1990)---Business executive & philanthropist

=== 1984 ===
- Wallace R. Bunn (1923-2011)---CEO of Bellsouth Corp.
- Joseph McConnell Farley (1927-2010)---Birmingham attorney, president of Alabama Power (1969-1989)
- John Witherspoon Woods (1931-2002)---Banking executive
- Oliver H. Delchamps, Jr. (1933- )---Director, U.S. Chamber of Commerce; heir to Delchamps grocery store chain
- Henry Calvin Goodrich (1920-2011)----Business executive; pres. of Southern Natural Resources

=== 1983 ===
- Charles Albert Boswell (1916-1995)---insurance executive, blind professional golfer, AL Commissioner of Revenue
- Harry B. Brock, Jr. (1925-2015)-----Financier and philanthropist
- John Key McKinley (1920-2014)---CEO of TEXACO
- Frank Arthur Plummer (1912-1987)---Banking executive.
- Frank Brooks Yeilding, Jr. (1904-1992)---Banking executive
- Thomas E. Bradford, Sr. (1909-2002)----Chairman, Bradford Gipin Food Brokers
- Joseph Lamar Lanier (1906-2000)----Noted textile manufacturer
- William Flynt Nichols (1918-1988)---U.S. Representative, 3rd and 4th Districts (1967-1988)
- Joab Langston Thomas (1933-2014)---President of the University of Alabama

=== 1982 ===
- Young Jacob Boozer, Jr. (1912-2000)----Business leader and college baseball star (UA)
- Kenneth R. Daniel (1913-2008)--Business and railroad executive (inducted also in 2009)
- Glenn Ireland II (1926-2015)---Business executive. Alabama Commissioner of Mental Health.
- Prime Francis Osborn III
- Howard Earle Skipper (1915-2006)---Noted American oncologist
- Dr. Buris Raye Boshell (1926- )---Noted physician in the area of diabetes research.
- Jeremiah Andrew Denton, Jr (1924-2014)---U.S. Senator, Alabama (1981-1987); the first Republican to be popularly elected in Alabama since the direct election of U.S. Senators began in 1914, the first Republican senator since Reconstruction to represent Alabama in the U.S. Senate, and the first Catholic to be elected to statewide office in Alabama.
- Kirkman O'Neal (1890-1988)---founder of Oneal Steel.
- Dr. James Allen Pittman, Jr. (1927-2014)---dean of UAB Medical School.
- Mary George Jordan Waite (1917-1990)---president of Farmer's and Merchant's Bank of Cherokee County.

=== 1981 ===
- Travis Massey Bedsole (1913-2011)---Mobile, AL attorney for 60 yrs
- Charles Trueheart Clayton (1911-?)---President, Liberty National Insurance
- William Houston Blount (1922-2011)----Philanthropist, president of Vulcan Materials
- Conrad Murphree Fowler (1918-2007)----Probate Judge of Shelby County, special prosecutor for "Phenix City Cleanup" (1954)

=== 1980 ===
- Dr. John M. Chenault (1914-1992)----President of Decatur General Hospital
- William Hulsey (1901-1985)---Investment banker and art collector
- Kench Lott, Jr. (1920-1995)----President of Merchant's Bank (Mobile, AL)
- Frank Samford, Jr. (1921-1986)----President of Liberty National Insurance
- Arthur Shores (1904-1996)----American civil rights attorney; Alabama'a "Drum Major For Justice".
- John Harbert III (1921-1995)---Founder and CEO of Harbert Construction
- Dr. Thomas N. James (1925-2010)---World renowned cardiologist
- James Mills (1900-1998)----Editor, Birmingham Post (1950-1967)

=== 1979 ===
- Robert Bamberg, Jr., Alabama Commissioner of Agriculture & Industries (1959-1962)
- Neal Berte, president of Birmingham–Southern College (1976-2004)
- Walter Gewin (1908-1981), federal judge (1961-1981)
- James Hardin (1917-1998), director of State Department of Finance; director of State Department of Mental Health
- Joseph McCorquodale, Jr., state representative (1959-1983); state Speaker of the House (1971-1983)
- Forrest H. James, governor of Alabama (1979-1983, 1995-1999)
- Frank M. Johnson, Jr. (1918-1999), U.S. federal judge (1955-1999) responsible for several landmark civil rights decisions
- Charles P. Rather, president of Southern Natural Gas
- Fran McKee (1926-2002), 1st female to hold rank of Rear Admiral in the U.S. Navy
- William Rushton III, insurance executive; CEO of Protective Life Corp.(1969-1992)

=== 1978 ===
- William D. Arant, Birmingham attorney
- Glen Brock, president of Gulf, Mobile and Ohio Railroad
- Alfred Delchamps, founder of Delchamps supermarket chain
- George LeMaistre (1911-1994), attorney/bank executive; chairman, FDIC (1977-1978)
- Seybourn Lynne (1907-2000), federal judge who decided Vivian Malone and James Hood civil rights cases
- John F. McRae, Mobile, community leader; responsible for helping to bring Senior Bowl to Ladd Stadium in Mobile
- Pelham J. Merrill (1907-1991), Associate Justice, Alabama Supreme Court (1953-1976)
- Bernard Monaghan (1916-1987), U.S. General Counsel of the Army (1952-1953) and CEO, Vulcan Materials (1959-1981)
- Armistead Selden, Jr. (1921-1985), U.S. Congressman, (1953-1969); U.S. Ambassador to New Zealand (1974-1979)
- Fred Sington (1910-1988), football player, Crimson Tide (1929-1930), professional baseball player (Brooklyn Dodgers/Washington Senators)

=== 1977 ===
- Ralph W. Adams (1915-1998), educator; president of Troy University
- John G. Galbraith (1914-1996), neurosurgeon
- John W. Bloomer, newspaper executive (Columbus Ledger); won Pulitzer Prize for coverage of clean-up of Phenix City
- Thomas B. Hill, Jr., Montgomery attorney
- John A. Cadell, attorney
- Robert E. Jones (1912-1997), U.S. Congressman, (1947-1963, 1965-1977)
- Walter W. Kennedy, Birmingham bank executive
- Emory Cunningham (1921-2000), publisher of The Progressive Farmer
- Carl Elliott (1913-1999), U.S. Congressman (1949-1965)
- Walter Frommeyer (196-1979), physician

=== 1976 ===
- Ehney Camp Jr. (1907-2009), Liberty National Life Insurance Company executive and banking expert
- R. Hugh Daniel (1906-1983), founder and CEO of Daniel International Org.
- John A. Hand, leader of the Alabama banking community for over 40 years
- Ruth Hanson (1900-1983), pioneer in the fight against diabetes in Alabama
- George Mattison, Jr., Birmingham industrialist and philanthropist
- Robert Parker, pediatrician
- Nell Rankin (1924-2005), operatic mezzo-soprano with Metropolitan Opera (1951-1976)
- Barrett Shelton (1903-1984), editor of The Decatur Daily (1924-1984)
- William M. Spencer, attorney; one of the founders of the Birmingham Museum of Art
- Jack W. Warner, president of Gulf States Paper; noted art collector

=== 1975 ===
- Rucker Agee
- James Browning Allen, U.S. Senator and 17th and 20th Lieutenant Governor of Alabama
- Joseph Linyer Bedsole
- Ben Screws Gilmer
- Milo Barrett Howard, Jr.
- Charles A. McCallum, Jr.
- Earl Mason McGowin
- George Mosley Murray, bishop who worked for civil rights and racial integration
- Julia Walker Ruseell
- William James Rushton

=== 1974 ===
- Clinton Jackson Coley
- Donald Comer, Jr.
- Luther H. Foster Jr.
- Howell Thomas Heflin, US Senator and Chief Justice of the Alabama Supreme Court
- Samuel Richardson Hill
- John Webster Kirklin, surgeon
- Thomas Seay Lawson
- J. Craig Smith
- Hudson Strode, author and university professor
- Luther Leonidas Terry, 9th US Surgeon General

=== 1973 ===
- Emmet Bryan Carmichael, biochemist
- Paul Grist, YMCA worker
- Forrest David Mathews, university president and 11th US Secretary of Health, Education, and Welfare
- Thomas Dameron Russell, businessman
- Frank Edward Spain, businessman
- Mervyn Hayden Sterne, businessman
- Ernest Stone, university president and Alabama Superintendent of Education
- Joseph F. Volker, university president
- Leslie Stephen Wright, university president

=== 1972 ===
- Tinsley R. Harrison, physician and author
- Ralph Jordan, football coach
- John C. Persons, US Army General and businessman
- Harry M. Philpott, university president
- Albert M. Rains, United States Representative

=== 1971 ===
No induction held.

=== 1970 ===
No induction held.

=== 1969 ===
- Winton M. Blount, United States Postmaster General
- Albert Preston Brewer, 47th governor of Alabama
- Paul W. Bryant, football coach
- James E. Folsom, 42nd governor of Alabama
- A.G. Gaston, businessman who worked for civil rights and racial integration
- Lister Hill, United States Senator
- Thomas H. Moorer, US Navy Admiral and chairman of the Joint Chiefs of Staff
- John Patterson, 44th governor of Alabama
- Frank A. Rose, university president
- Frank P. Samford, businessman and civic leader
- Bertha Smolian, philanthropist and civic leader
- John Sparkman, United States Senator
- Wernher von Braun, space scientist
- George C. Wallace, 45th, 48th, and 50th governor of Alabama
