= Billie Young =

American actor, activist, poet and educator (1947–2021)

- Born: July 21, 1947
- Died: March 31, 2021 (aged 73)

Billie Jean Young (July 21, 1947 – March 31, 2021) was an American actress, activist, poet and educator.

She lived in Marion, Alabama, from where she traveled the world to teach and work with young people. She graduated from Judson College, and Samford University's Cumberland School of Law. She taught at Jackson State University. She has taught at Mississippi State University, Meridian campus. She was Artist-in-Residence at Judson College. Her papers are held at the University of Alabama Hoole Special Collections Library.

Young died on March 31, 2021, at the age of 73.

== Awards ==
- 1984: MacArthur Fellows Program
- 1995: Mississippi Governor's Award for Artistic Achievement
- 1995: Lucy Terry Prince Unsung Heroine Award
- 2009: Southern Rural Black Women's Hall of Fame Award
- 2011: Girl Scouts of North Central Alabama Woman of Distinction Award
- 2014: Black Belt Hall of Fame Award

== Works ==
- "Fannie Lou Hamer: This Little Light", Mississippi Writers: Drama, Editor Dorothy Abbott, University Press of Mississippi, 1991, ISBN 978-0-87805-238-7
- Fear Not The Fall, New South Books, 2004, ISBN 978-1-58838-161-3
- Editor, Now How You Do, a memoir, 2009, Westry Wingate Press, ISBN 978-1-935323-04-4
- Family Secrets, Westry Wingate Press, 2009,ISBN 9781935323150
