= The Alabama Baptist =

American weekly newspaper

- Type: Weekly newspaper
- Owner(s): The Alabama Baptist, Inc. (Alabama Baptist Convention)
- Founder(s): Milo P. Jewett, Gen. Edwin D. King, James H. DeVotie, and Julia T. Barron
- Publisher: The Alabama Baptist
- Editor: Jennifer Rash
- Founded: Feb. 4, 1843
- Language: English
- Headquarters: 3310 Independence Drive, Birmingham, Alabama
- City: Birmingham, Alabama
- Country: United States
- Circulation: 55,000 subscribers
- Readership: 200,000
- OCLC number: 948518807
- Website: thealabamabaptist.org

The Alabama Baptist is a weekly newspaper. It is the largest state Baptist paper in circulation. It is an entity of the Alabama Baptist State Convention owned by The Alabama Baptist, Inc., under leadership of a board of directors approved by messengers to the Alabama Baptist State Convention.

== History ==
On February 4, 1843, the first issue of The Alabama Baptist was printed in Marion, Alabama. The Association of Brethren appeared on the masthead as the owners and editors. The association was composed of Milo Parker Jewett, James H. DeVotie, Gen. Edwin Davis “E.D.” King and Julia Tarrant Barron. All were active members of Siloam Baptist Church in Marion and were financially able to secure the paper's future. That autumn, convention messengers adopted a resolution calling The Alabama Baptist the organ through which convention officers would communicate with the churches, and Baptists finally had a voice. The resolution “urgently” recommended the paper be placed in every Baptist home in the state, and it “warmly” commended the “energy and liberality” of those who started the paper. But the 1843 report of the Committee on Periodicals of the State Convention made it clear that the convention had no liabilities for what the independent paper published.

A few historians over the years have suggested that a paper called The Family Visitor was a precursor to The Alabama Baptist newspaper, but no written accounts have survived to support this claim. Alabama Baptist State Convention annuals from 1833 through 1863 make no reference to The Family Visitor being a denominational publication.

== Editors ==
- Samuel Henderson
- Hardin E. Taliaferro
- John Jefferson Deyampert Renfroe
- Edwin Theodore Winkler
- John L. West
- John Gideon Harris
- Frank Willis Barnett
- Leslie Lee Gwaltney
- Leon Meertief Macon
- Hudson Doyle Baggett
- Bobby S. “Bob” Terry
- Jennifer Davis Rash

== Today ==
The Alabama Baptist publishes 50 issues annually and maintains an active online presence. The weekly paper is mailed to more than 55,000 homes, with a total readership of about 200,000. More than 3,000 subscribers receive the PDF edition each week. The newspaper attempts to provide concise and balanced reporting of events related to religion, and gives editorial advice on moral and ethical issues from a biblical standpoint.

== Awards ==
The Alabama Baptist has been honored by Associated Church Press, Evangelical Press Association and Religion Communicators Council as the top regional Christian newspaper in America. The paper also has won awards in writing, photography, design and general excellence from these three groups as well as Baptist Communicators Association. The commitment to the Christian faith and the outstanding professional preparation of the paper's staff is reflected by more than 200 national awards that hang in the Halls of Honor at the state Baptist paper's office building.

== See also ==
- History of Baptists in Alabama
