= Judson College (Alabama) =

Private women's college in Marion, Alabama 1838–2021

- Motto: Lux et Veritas
- Motto in English: Light and Truth
- Type: Private women's college
- Active: 1838–2021
- Religious affiliation: Baptist (Alabama Baptist Convention)
- President: Daphne Rudicell Robinson
- Location: Marion, Alabama, United States; 32.63063°N 87.31587°W
- Campus: Rural, 118 acres (48 ha)
- Website: judson.edu
- Judson College Historic District
- U.S. National Register of Historic Places
- U.S. Historic district
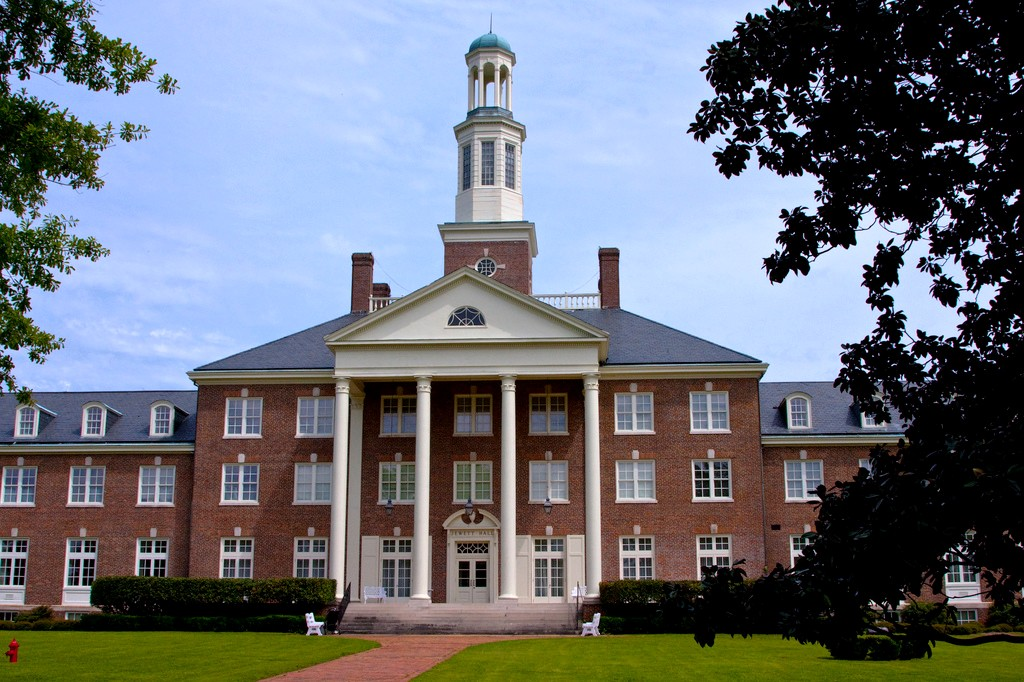
- Jewett Hall, within the Judson College Historic District
- Location: Roughly bounded by East Lafayette, Curb, Mason and Washington Streets
- Coordinates: 32°37′49″N 87°18′52″W
- Architectural style: Colonial Revival, Classical Revival, Greek Revival
- NRHP reference No.: 92001825
- Added to NRHP: February 3, 1993

Judson College was a private women's college in Marion, Alabama. It was founded in 1838 and suspended its academic operations on July 31, 2021.

== History ==
Judson College was founded by members of Siloam Baptist Church in 1838, making it the fifth-oldest women's college in the country at the time of its 2021 closure. Judson was named after Ann Hasseltine Judson, the first female foreign missionary from the United States to Burma (now Myanmar).

Businesswoman Julia Tarrant Barron and General Edwin Davis King, with the support of other members of Siloam Baptist Church, enlisted the help of Dr. Milo Parker Jewett, a recent graduate of Dartmouth College and Andover Theological Seminary. Jewett had come to Alabama with the goal of establishing a school for young women that would provide them with the same quality of education that young men received at Harvard and Yale. Jewett became the first president of Judson and later of Vassar College. Judson was affiliated with the Alabama Baptist Convention throughout its history and received funding from the convention.

The college was granted an exception to Title IX in 2015 which allowed it to legally discriminate against LGBT students for religious reasons.

Enrollment at Judson in 2019 was 268 and the college offered bachelor's degrees in liberal arts and pre-professional programs.

In 2020 the college experienced severe financial challenges due to declining enrollment and COVID-19. In December, the college's president issued an urgent plea for $500,000 in donations to prevent the college from closing immediately. Although it had raised $1.3 million, enrollment dropped from 145 in the fall of 2020 to 80 for the fall of 2021. In May 2021, the college's board of trustees voted to close the college and begin Chapter 11 bankruptcy proceedings. The college closed its residence halls after the spring semester ended and suspended academic operations after the summer term ending July 31, 2021.

In 2022, the school's archives were transferred to Samford University, a sister school, founded in Marion which relocated to Birmingham in 1887. In 2024, court documents showed that Judson College had filed for Chapter 11 bankruptcy, three years after initially planning to do so.

== Campus ==
The principal building of the campus at the time of the school's closure was Jewett Hall, the third of this name. The first Jewett Hall, built in 1840, was a four-story Greek Revival building named after Milo P. Jewett. It was destroyed by fire in 1888. The rebuilding of Jewett Hall was begun that same year. In 1947 the dome was hit by a lightning strike and fire consumed the building. Rebuilding efforts began almost immediately, and funds were raised by the sale of bricks from the rubble. A third fire occurred in the attic of this building as mattresses were lit on fire, but the fire was put out with little damage to the building.

Other notable buildings on campus include A. Howard Bean Hall, a former Carnegie library which now houses the Alabama Women's Hall of Fame as well as 2 classrooms, the Alumnae Auditorium, and the Women's Missionary Union residence hall.

== Student life ==
Judson College participated in joint social and civic events with Marion Military Institute, also located in Marion. Many of these events and traditions date as far back as the Civil War and are connected culturally to that era. It had a chapter of Phi Mu Gamma sorority from 1904–1913.

Judson College was ranked among the "Absolute Worst Campuses for LGBTQ Youth" in the US by Campus Pride.

== Notable alumnae ==
- Titilayo Adedokun (1973-), singer (soprano) and beauty queen
- Gwen Bristow (1903-1980), author
- Sallie Curb Arnold (1880-1982), artist and educator
- Caroline Dormon (1888–1971), botanist and author
- Scottie McKenzie Frasier (1884-1964), teacher, author, lecturer, and suffragist
- Margaret Lea Houston (1819–1867), First Lady of Texas
- Billie Young (1947-2021), actress, activist, poet and educator.
- Evelyn Daniel Anderson (August 2, 1926 – October 7, 1998), American educator and advocate for the physically disabled.
- Mary Ward Brown (June 18, 1917 – May 14, 2013), American short story writer and memoirist.
- Janie Shores (April 30, 1932 – August 9, 2017) Supreme Court of Alabama judge and first woman to ever serve on that court.

== Namesake colleges ==
- Judson University (Illinois) is the namesake of Ann Judson's husband, Adoniram Judson.
