= James A. Ranaldson =

Southern Baptist missionary (1789–1849)

James A. Ranaldson (1789 – 17 June 1849) was a Baptist missionary who was active in the Mississippi Baptist Association and one of the founders of the Alabama Baptist Convention.

Ranaldson was born in Brunswick County, North Carolina in 1789. He became a Baptist minister around 1812. Moving to New Orleans, Louisiana in 1817, he worked for several months as a missionary in the Indian territories of Alabama, Mississippi, and Louisiana. Later that year he founded Shiloh Church in Feliciana, Mississippi, and became a teacher to cover his expenses, establishing the Society Hill Academy in 1818. In October 1817 the Mississippi Baptist Association appointed him to a committee to create a plan for an educational fund for pious young men, and to prepare an address to churches on the subject. In October 1818 the report was received and he was made Secretary of the Mississippi Baptist Education Society for three years. He was an active member of the Mississippi Baptist Association until 1829, preaching in different churches and serving at different times as a messenger, clerk and secretary.

Ranaldson founded a Baptist church in St. Francisville, Louisiana in 1823. The same year he assisted in the formation of the Alabama Baptist Convention, arranging for a meeting of Baptist leaders in October 1823 at Greensboro, Alabama. Along with Dempsey Winborne and Hosea Holcome he prepared the plan for a constitution, and his address (after revision by Winborne and Alexander Travis) was printed for distribution to the churches of Alabama. Charles Crow was appointed president of the new Convention, and Ranaldson secretary. Ranaldson moved to Jackson, Louisiana around 1831, where he founded a school. After briefly associating with the Stone-Campbell Restoration Movement and becoming a farmer, he returned to the Baptist faith and founded a church at Port Hudson, Louisiana, where he died on June 17, 1849.
