= Church Square (Columbus, Georgia) =

- U.S. National Register of Historic Places
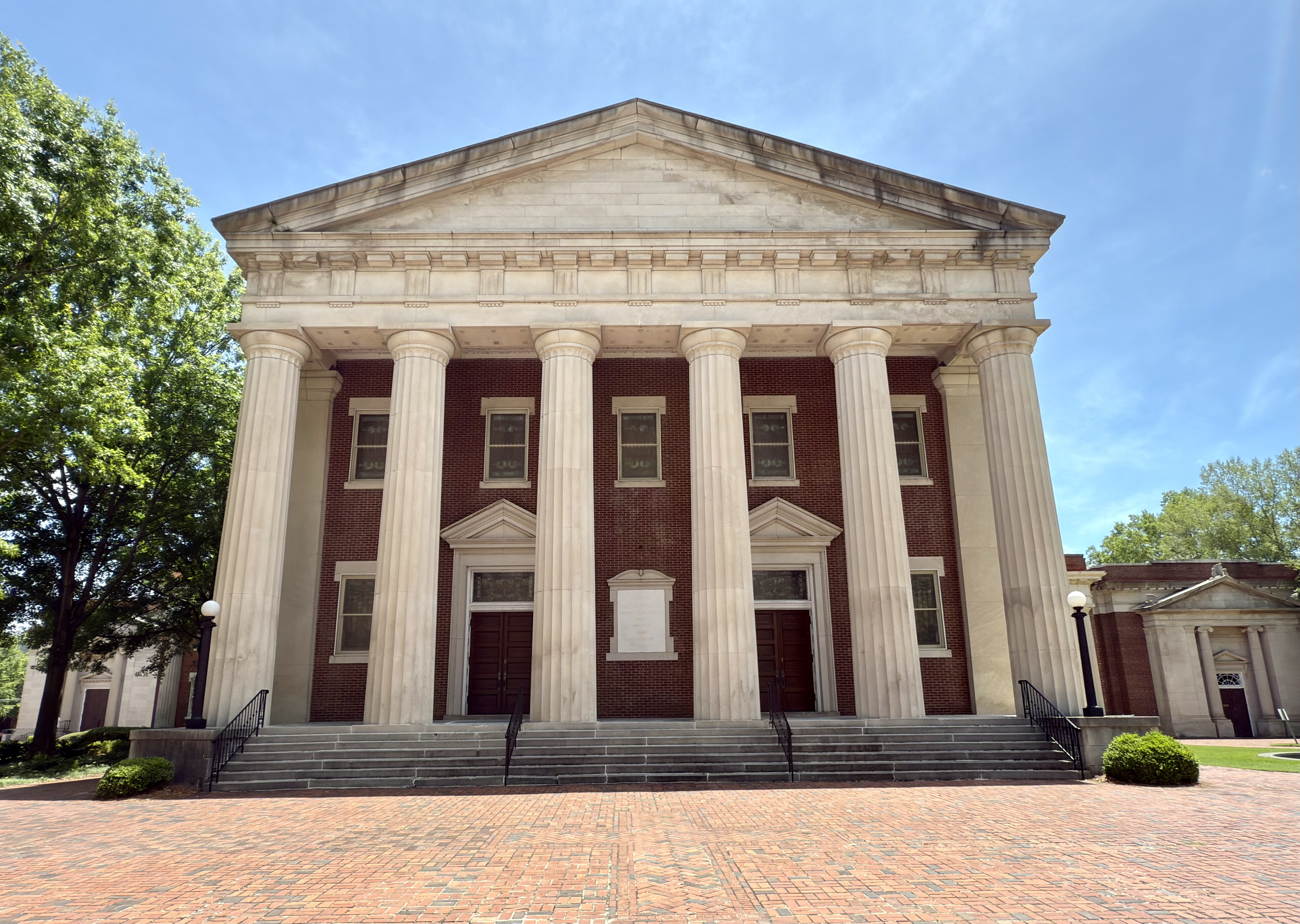
- First Baptist Church in 2025

- Location within Georgia Location within the United States
- Location: Roughly bounded by 2nd and 3rd Aves., 11th and 12th Sts., Columbus, Georgia
- Coordinates: 32°28′3″N 84°59′23″W
- Area: 4 acres (1.6 ha)
- Built: 1859
- Architectural style: Greek Revival
- MPS: Columbus MRA
- NRHP reference No.: 80001151
- Added to NRHP: December 2, 1980

Church Square is a city block in downtown Columbus, Georgia home to two churches: First Baptist Church of Columbus and St. Luke United Methodist Church. The block, located between 2nd and 3rd Avenues and 11th and 12th Streets, is significant because it is the only remaining square designated for church use by Edward Lloyd Thomas, who surveyed the area in 1828 and drew up the original city plan. The square was listed on the National Register of Historic Places on December 2, 1980.

== History ==
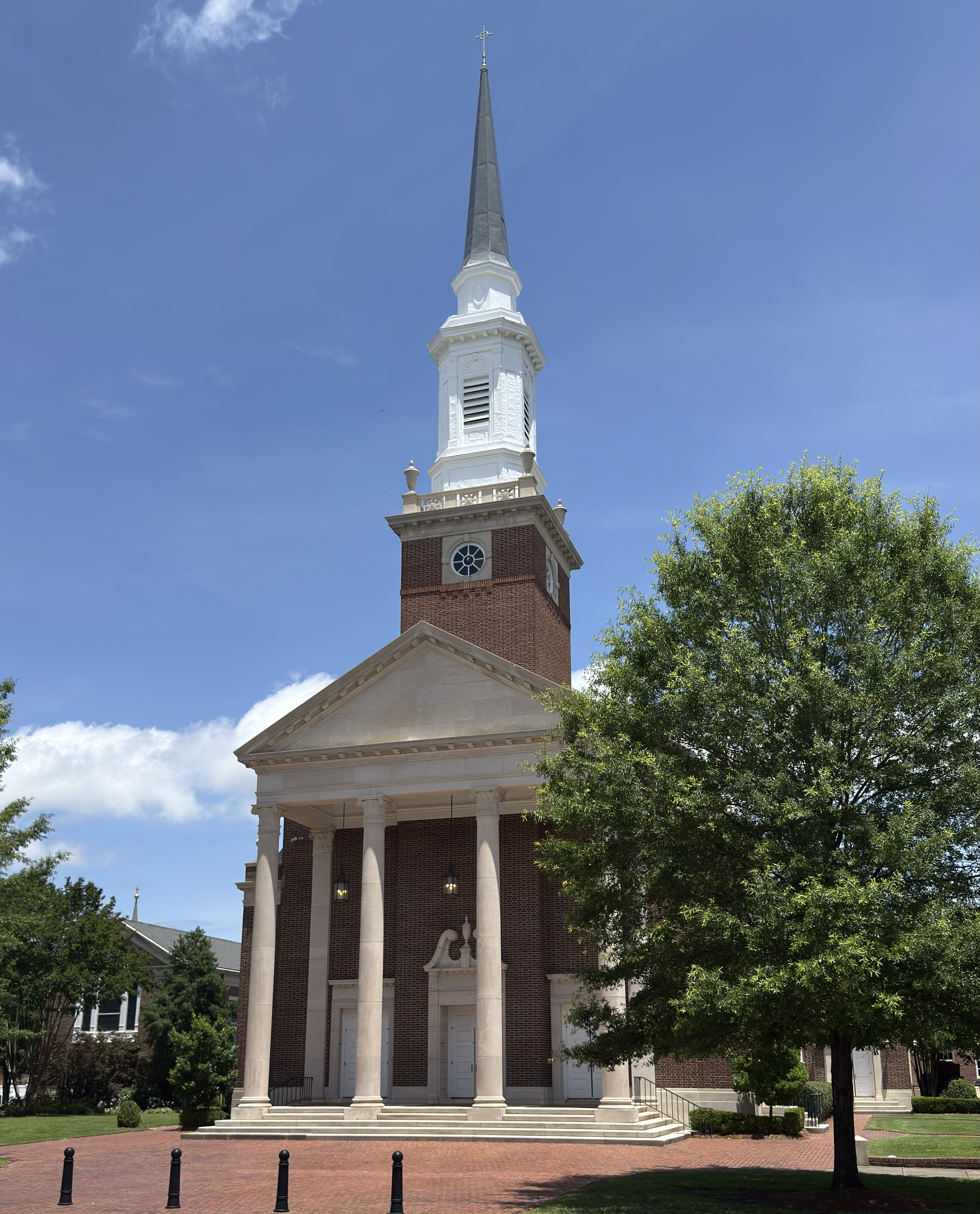
St. Luke Church

The town of Columbus was established by an act of the Georgia legislature on December 24, 1827, one of only four cities in the state to be formed by government action. The area was surveyed by Edward Lloyd Thomas under the supervision of then-Georgia governor John Forsyth the following year. The city, which was to be located on the Chattahoochie River at Coweta Falls, was established to bring pioneers out to the western portion of the state, serving as an agricultural, industrial, and transportation hub, using the river as the source for all three of these operations. The 1828 plan included a rectangular grid of city blocks thirteen long and eight wide which encompassed the area bounded by what is now 17th Street, 10th Avenue, and the river, much of which is now listed on the National Register of Historic Places as the Columbus Historic District. At several locations throughout the area were "squares" dedicated to civic, religious, and academic use, among them Church Square between 2nd and 3rd Avenues and 11th and 12 Streets. Of the squares designated for religious use, Church Square is the only one to still be used for that purpose at present.

== The two congregations ==
Church Square has been home to a congregation of Baptists and one of Methodists since its inception. Lot B, the southern lot, was granted to the Methodists in 1828 while the northern Lot A was given to the Baptists in 1829.

=== The Baptists ===
The Baptist congregation occupying the northern lot of the square was founded on February 14, 1829, under the name Ephesus Baptist Church. The congregation built a small wooden meeting house in 1830, which was later moved to the back of the lot and replaced by a brick building in 1840. Under the ministry of James H. DeVotie, a new structure was dedicated on October 25, 1859, and the congregation has met there ever since, later changing its name to the First Baptist Church of Columbus. The Greek Revival structure is the oldest sanctuary still extant in downtown Columbus.

The sanctuary was originally built two stories tall with a Gothic steeple, although the steeple was removed during renovations in 1896–97. The bell that was inside the steeple was removed and is now displayed to the northeast of the main sanctuary. The building is rectangular with a pentagonal apse and a gabled roof. Six Doric columns and a pediment were added to the facade in 1909, largely transforming the building from its Gothic roots into a Neoclassical structure. The two entrances on the front facade are also capped by pediments similar in design to the main pediment of the building. The building is flanked by two-story stained glass windows separated by brick pilasters with granite bases and caps. Other structures on the lot were added between 1924 and 1948 and mimic the style of the main sanctuary.

=== The Methodists ===
The Methodist congregation slightly predates the Baptist one, having been founded in 1828. The congregation has gone through five different buildings, each built on the same lot, replacing old ones. The current building was constructed in 1948.
