= Alabama Baptist State Board of Missions =

American autonomous association of Baptist churches

- Abbreviation: ALSBOM
- Classification: Evangelical Christianity
- Scripture: Bible
- Theology: Baptist
- Polity: Congregational
- Executive director: Rick Lance
- Associations: Southern Baptist Convention
- Region: Alabama, United States
- Origin: 1823
- Official website: http://www.alsbom.org/

The Alabama Baptist State Board of Missions (ALSBOM) is an autonomous association of Baptist churches in the U.S. state of Alabama formed in 1823. It is one of the state conventions associated with the Southern/Great Commission Baptists.

The Alabama Baptist State Board of Missions promotes evangelism and discipleship in Alabama, develops church leadership, assists in the foundation of new churches and funds state-level, national and global missions including a newspaper, Christian schools, children's aid programs, retirement centers and so on. The ALSBOM is supported by the Cooperative Program, where affiliated Baptist churches in Alabama donate a part of their revenues to the ABSC.

It was one of the original nine state conventions to send delegates to the first Southern Baptist Convention, organized in 1845.

== History ==
=== Early years ===
The Alabama State Convention was formed in 1823 at the Salem Church just outside Greensboro, Alabama, primarily through the instigation of James A. Ranaldson, a Baptist from Louisiana. For the first few years, its members were primarily delegations from Baptist missionary societies, reflecting the frontier nature of the Alabama territory at the time. Later the delegates came from individual Baptist churches and regional associations as well. Prominent members of the convention in the early years included Hosea Holcombe, Alexander Travis, James McLemore, Dempsey Winborne, Sion Blythe, Charles Crow, A. G. McCrow, and Joseph Ryan.

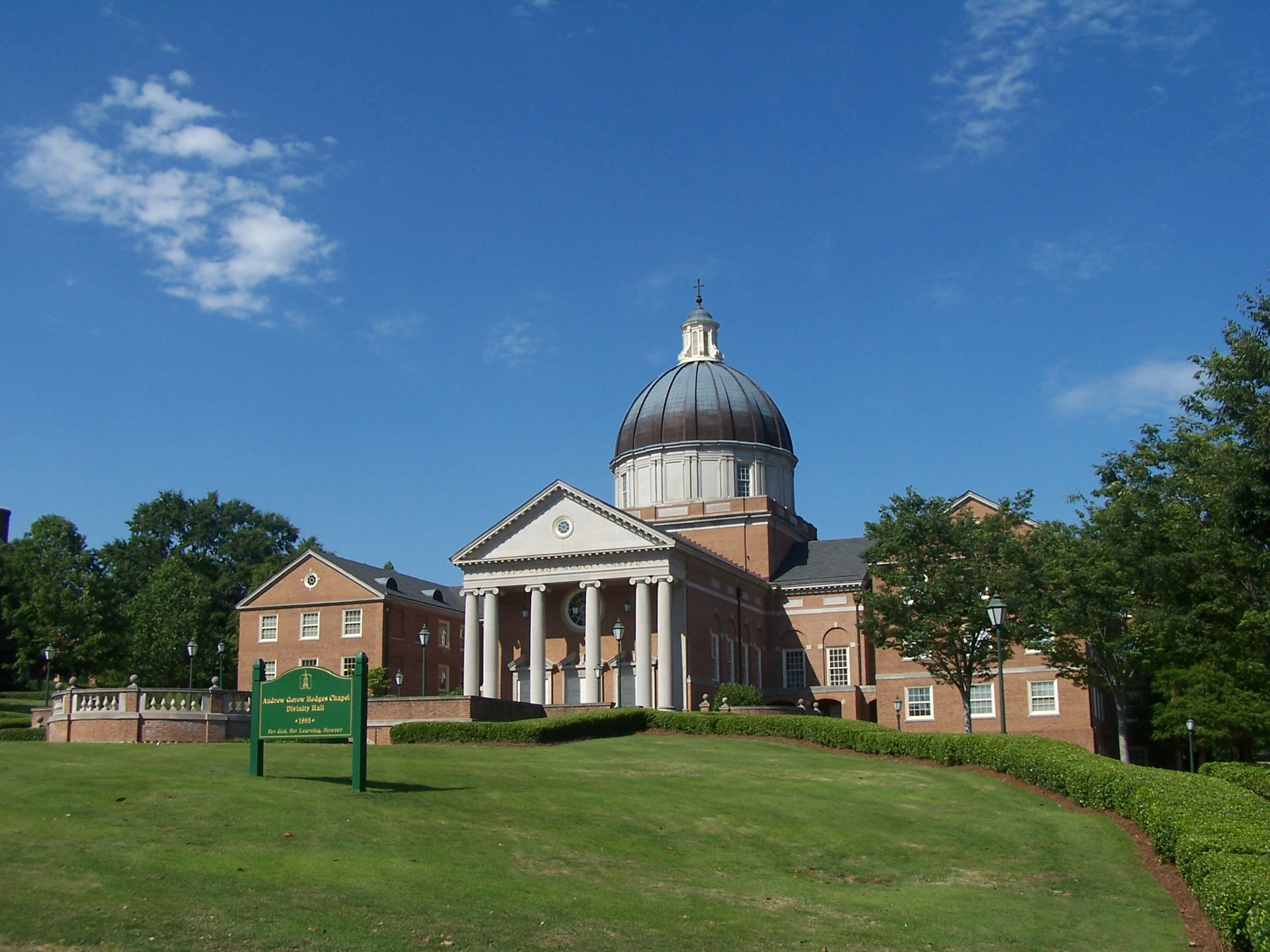
Beeson Divinity School at Samford University, formerly known as Howard College

The convention made financial contributions to the Baptist General Convention of the United States, as well as providing financial support for Adoniram Judson's translation of the Bible into Burmese, to support the Baptist mission in Burma. At the ABSC's tenth annual session, in 1833, which was held at Grant's Creek Church in Tuscaloosa County, the convention resolved to found an educational institution, to be called the Manual Labor Seminary. But, this project foundered after five years. In Alabama, local Baptists founded Judson College for women in 1838; and Howard College for men in 1841. Wealthy members donated funds to create a statewide newspaper, the Alabama Baptist, in 1843. The Board of Domestic Missions (later called the Home Mission Board) was established in 1845; all were signs of the denomination's growth and maturing in the state.

=== Slavery issue ===
In the years of increasing sectional tensions about the Baptist Church's position on slavery and abolition prior to the American Civil War, some Northern members opposed the appointment as missionaries of Southern Baptists who were slaveholders. Objecting to this infringement on their culture, in 1844, the ABSC passed the "Alabama Resolutions". Included was the following:

2. Resolved, That our duty at this crisis requires us to demand from the proper authorities in all those bodies to whose funds we have contributed, or with whom we have in any way been connected, the distinct, explicit, avowal that slaveholders are eligible, and entitled, equally with non-slaveholders, to all the privileges and immunities of their several unions; and especially to receive any agency, mission, or other appointment, which may run within the scope of their operation or duties.

Rev. Basil Manly, Sr., then president of the University of Alabama (1838–1855), drafted the resolutions. A strong supporter of the institution of slavery, Manly owned a plantation and 40 slaves. He argued for the humanity of slaves, but thought the institution was part of the proper scheme of man's social structures, and that the Baptist religion could help support proper treatment of slaves.

In 1844 the ABSC sent its resolutions to the Board of the Triennial Convention. Following the Home Mission Society's rejection of James E. Reeve for appointment as a missionary because he was a slaveholder, Alabama and other southern state Baptist conventions withdrew their funding from the national convention and formed the Southern Baptist Convention in 1845. It was another sign of the severe sectional tensions that developed in the nation before the outbreak of war.

=== Post-Civil War ===
In 1871, the ABSC established a Sabbath-school Board. In 1875 this became the State Mission Board, originally located in Talladega. In 1880, it relocated to Selma in 1880. In the postwar years, women became increasingly active, in 1879 creating the women's central missions' committee, the predecessor of the Women's Missionary Union (WMU). In 1886, E. B. Teague introduced a resolution at the state convention to move Howard College to Birmingham. In 1887, the Convention relocated Howard College from Marion to Birmingham, which was industrializing and growing rapidly.

While historically women constituted the majority of members of the Baptist Church and played many active roles in providing charity and supporting education, they were not ordained as ministers or allowed to hold offices in the church, associations and conventions. Gradually they took on more formal leadership roles. The ASBC did admit women delegates in 1913, years before they received the right to vote through the national amendment to the constitution. In 1972 the convention elected its first woman vice-president, Miriam Jackson, then dean of women at Jacksonville State University and recording secretary for the Alabama Baptist Executive Board.

The church accepted and supported separate churches for African Americans. The St. Louis Street Missionary Baptist Church in Mobile was established in 1853, and the first three pastors were white, but in 1865 the title was transferred to the first African-American pastor, Rev. Charles Leavens. In 1874, the ABC passed a resolution at this church to establish an educational institute for blacks called Selma University.

=== Civil rights movement ===
The civil rights movement of the 1950s and 1960s forced changes in the position of the organization on segregation. In 1956 the Christian Life Commission of the ABC described the first black student of the University of Alabama as a "seeming tool of the NAACP" and said it could not view the policy of forced integration as "the will of God for our state in 1956". The ABC commission called for "more independent" black ministers to help defuse racial tensions, but had difficulty finding ministers who were not associated with the NAACP, at least in sympathy.

In 1995, the Southern Baptist Convention voted to adopt a resolution renouncing its racist roots and apologizing for its past defense of slavery. ABC churches and denominational leadership were supportive of this apology.

In 1999 Dr. Thomas E. Corts, president of Samford University said "The Alabama Baptist Convention ... are on record as saying that we need to grant opportunities to all races, and we don't want to compromise that opportunity. We're all God's children."

== Affiliations ==
The Alabama Baptist State Board of Missions promotes evangelism and discipleship in Alabama, develops church leadership, assists in the foundation of new churches and funds state-level, national and global missions including a newspaper, Christian schools, children's aid programs, retirement centers and so on. The ABSC is supported by the Cooperative Program, where affiliated Baptist churches in Alabama donate a part of their revenues to the ABSC.

The ABSC partners with the Southern/Great Commission Baptists and provides funding and other forms of support to the national organization. There have been questions about the relationship. In summer of 2007 Russ Bush, academic dean of the Southeastern Baptist Theological Seminary in Wake Forest, North Carolina proposed that churches should write separate checks to the ABSC and the SBC rather than have the ABSC decide how funds were to be allocated. As of 2000 there were 3,148 congregations in Alabama associated with the national convention, with 1,380,121 adherents.

ABSC President Jimmy Jackson was a candidate to become President of the SBC in June 2010. If elected, he would have been the second Alabama Baptist pastor to serve as SBC president. Jonathan Haralson was the first to fill that role, serving as SBC President from 1889 to 1898. In the event, Bryant Wright of Johnson Ferry Baptist Church in Marietta, Georgia was elected.

== Related organizations ==
=== The Alabama Baptist newspaper ===
The Alabama Baptist is a weekly newspaper that was first published on February 4, 1843, initially an independent newspaper but supported by Baptist leaders in the state. It was purchased by the Alabama Baptist State Convention in 1919, and now has a circulation of 100,000. The newspaper is based in Birmingham, Alabama

=== Education ===
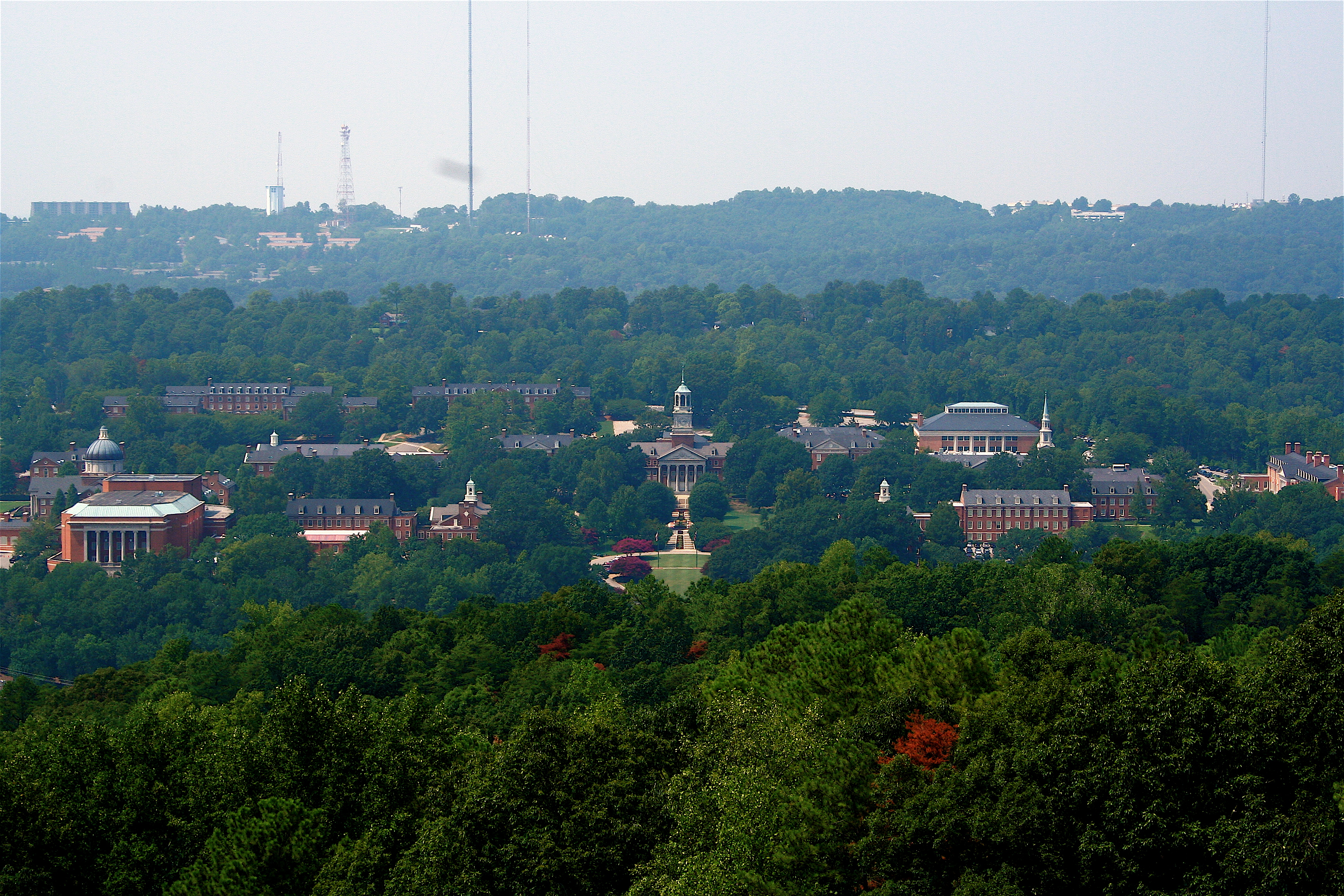
Bird's-eye view of the Samford University campus

The Judson Female Institute was established by members of Siloam Baptist Church of Marion, opening on January 7, 1839. It was renamed Judson College in 1903. The purpose was to provide a Christian education to female students. Judson College remained affiliated with the ABSC throughout its history until it closed. It permanently ceased its academic operations on July 31, 2021.

Samford University was founded by the Alabama Baptists in 1841 as Howard College in Marion and moved to Birmingham in 1887. The college gained university status and changed its name in 1965. The college became a ministry of the convention and its trustees were elected by the convention for most of the university's history. Samford's formal connection to the ABSC ended in 2017, but the two bodies still work with each other in various ways. It is now Alabama's largest private university with an endowment of more than $327 million and an enrollment of 5,791 students as of Fall 2023.

The Alabama Baptist State Convention agreed in 1959 to build and operate a college in Mobile if the community provided sufficient funds, which was achieved. Mobile College was chartered in 1961 and became the University of Mobile in 1993. The university remains affiliated with the ABSC.

=== Baptist Foundation of Alabama ===
Formed in 1940 as the ABC's trust agency, as of 2010 the Baptist Foundation of Alabama managed over $230 million in assets for individuals, churches, and Baptist entities.

=== Other ministries ===
Shocco Springs is a Christian Conference Center that hosts meetings and retreats in Talladega, Alabama.

The Alabama Woman's Missionary Union based in Prattville encourages missional living, empowering Alabama Baptists to fulfill the "Great Commission".

The Alabama Baptist Children's Homes & Family Ministries based in Birmingham, Alabama is a child and family service agency, a non-profit organization that provides counseling for families and provides care for children in foster homes, group homes and emergency shelters.

Alabama Baptist Retirement Centers based in Prattville, established in 1975, runs four retirement centers in Dothan, Montgomery and Roanoke.

The Alabama Baptist Historical Commission based in Birmingham, provides historical resources and supports research into Alabama Baptist history.

== See also ==
- History of Baptists in Alabama
