= Sion Blythe =

- Born: January , 1781; North Carolina, U.S.
- Died: August 23, 1835 (aged 54); Coahuila y Tejas, Mexico
- Occupation: Baptist pastor
- Spouse: Sarah T. McMinn

Sion Blythe (January 1781 – 23 August 1835) was a Baptist pastor who assisted in creation of several churches in North Carolina and Alabama, United States in the early days of the Baptist movement.

Blythe was born in western North Carolina in January 1781. He was baptized when aged 21 and ordained as a pastor when aged 23, preaching in Buncombe County, North Carolina and elsewhere. He was among the founders of Locust Old Field Church in western North Carolina. He married Sarah T. McMinn in 1803. In 1807 he was one of the founders of the French Broad Association of six churches in or near the county of Buncombe.

Blythe moved to Alabama in 1816 and settled on Canoe Creek in St. Clair County. He was called the "reluctant preacher" because when he first arrived as a farmer settler in Alabama he tried to hide the fact that he was a minister, since he had some doubts about his ability. The secret could not be kept. He helped organize Mount Zion Church (now First Baptist Church of Springville) and several other churches in today's St. Clair, Blount, Shelby, and Jefferson Counties, including the Mount Moriah Church. First Baptist Church Trussville was founded on 14 July 1821 by nine men with Blythe as pastor. In 1823 he was appointed moderator of the newly formed Mount Zion Association, and messenger to the Alabama Baptist State Convention. Blythe was a successful revivalist, described as "tender, urgent, vehement". However, he was said to be better at winning converts than teaching doctrine, and was "somewhat of an Arminian".

Blythe left Alabama in 1834 and settled in Texas in April, 1835, at that time part of Mexico. He was granted a tract of land about seven miles south of the present town of Dublin. On 23 August the same year he and one of his children died of a fever. He was survived by his wife and nine children.
