= James H. DeVotie =

America Baptist minister (1814–1891)

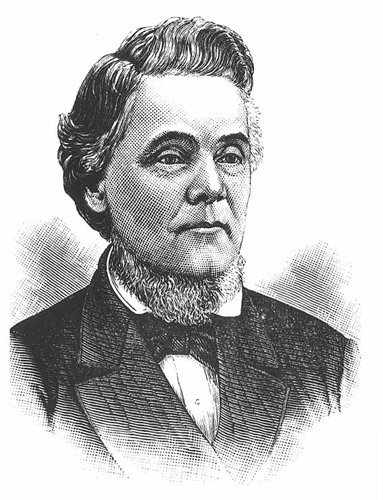
- Born: September 24, 1814; Oneida County, New York
- Died: February 16, 1891 (aged 76)
- Education: Furman Theological Seminary
- Occupation: Pastor
- Spouses: Margaret Noble DeVotie; Georgia L. Amoss DeVotie
- Children: 5, including Noble Leslie DeVotie
- Military career
- Allegiance: Confederate States of America (1861–1865)
- Branch: Confederate States Army
- Service years: 1861–1865
- Rank: Chaplain

James Harvey DeVotie (1814–1891) was a Baptist minister in the American South. Born in Oneida County, New York, he was a pastor in South Carolina, Alabama, and Georgia. He was a co-founder of Howard College in Marion, Alabama, later known as Samford University, near Birmingham. He was a long-time trustee of Mercer University in Macon, Georgia. He served as a Confederate chaplain during the Civil War. After the war, he worked for the Southern Baptist Convention.

== Early life ==
James Harvey DeVotie was born on September 24, 1814, in Oneida County, New York, to Presbyterian parents. His father died when DeVotie was a child. At the age of seventeen, he moved to Savannah, Georgia, where one of his uncles lived. Because his uncle was a Baptist, DeVotie joined a Baptist church in 1831, when he was baptized by Reverend Henry O. Wyer in Savannah.

DeVotie studied at the Furman Theological Seminary in South Carolina.

== Ministry ==
DeVotie was ordained as a Baptist minister in 1832. From 1833 to 1835, he served as the minister of the Baptist church in Camden, South Carolina. He then served as a Baptist minister in Montgomery, Alabama from 1835 to 1836. He served as the minister of the First Baptist Church in Tuscaloosa from 1836 to 1840. He then served as the pastor of Siloam Baptist Church in Marion, Alabama from 1840 to 1854. He also served as the minister of Hopewell Baptist Church near Marion from 1854 to 1855.

He served at the First Baptist Church of Columbus, Georgia from 1856 to 1870. In 1858, he was responsible for paving for the way for the erection of a new church building, which still stands today. The new building cost US$28,000, all of which was paid for by 1860. During the American Civil War of 1861-1865, DeVotie served as a chaplain in the Confederate States Army to the Second Regiment of Georgia Volunteers. He also took care of the poor, widows and orphans during the war. He then served as the minister of the Baptist church in Griffin, Georgia from 1870 to 1877.

== Roles in the Baptist Church ==
DeVotie was the founder of the Alabama Baptist Bible Society and served as its president from 1836 to 1856. He was also a co-founder of The Alabama Baptist in 1836. He served as the Secretary of the Domestic and Indian Mission Board of the Southern Baptist Convention from 1855 to 1856. In 1877, he served on the Home Mission Board and later the Georgia Baptist State Mission Board of the Southern Baptist Convention. In this latter role, he attempted to convert former slaves to the Baptist faith.

DeVotie served as the President of the Board of Trustees of the antebellum Alabama Female Athenaeum in Tuscaloosa. He was a co-founder of Howard College in Marion, which later became Samford University near Birmingham. He was the owner of the land upon which Samford was built, which he donated for this purpose. He served as the President of the college's Board of Trustees for two years, and as a regular trustee for fifteen years. He also served on the Board of Trustees of Mercer University in Macon, Georgia for twenty-two years. Additionally, he served as the President of the Board of Trustees of the Columbus Public Schools.

== Personal life, death and legacy ==
DeVotie married Margaret Noble in 1835. They had five children. One of their sons, Noble Leslie DeVotie, was the founder of the Sigma Alpha Epsilon fraternity and later served as a Baptist Confederate chaplain. After his first wife died in 1872, he married Georgia L. Amoss in 1873.

DeVotie died on February 16, 1891. The James H. DeVotie Papers are kept in the William R. Perkins Library at Duke University. The DeVotie Legacy Society at Samford University was founded in 1995.
