= Andrew Westmoreland =

American academic administrator

Coordinates: 33.46570°N 86.79214°W

18th President of Samford University
- In office 2006–2021
- Preceded by: Thomas E. Corts
- Succeeded by: Beck A. Taylor

President of Ouachita Baptist University
- In office 1998–2006
- Preceded by: Ben M. Elrod
- Succeeded by: Rex Horne

Personal details
- Born: Batesville, Arkansas
- Education: Ouachita Baptist University (B.A.); University of Arkansas at Fayetteville (M.A.); University of Arkansas at Little Rock (Ed.D)

Andrew Westmoreland is a retired American academic administrator. He was the 18th President of Samford University in Birmingham, Alabama from 2006 to 2021. Previously he was the president of Ouachita Baptist University in Arkadelphia, Arkansas from 1998 to 2006, .

== Early life ==
Andrew Westmoreland was born in Batesville, Arkansas. He received a B.A. in political science from Ouachita Baptist University in 1979, an M.A. in the same field from the University of Arkansas at Fayetteville, and an Ed.D. in Higher Education Administration from the University of Arkansas at Little Rock.

== Career ==
Westmoreland served as the 14th president of Ouachita Baptist University in Arkadelphia, Arkansas from 1998 to 2006. From July 2006 to June 2021 he served as the president of Samford University. In addition to serving as president, he has also taught political science at Samford University and served as the director of the Frances Marlin Mann Center for Leadership and Ethics Westmoreland was also initiated into Omicron Delta Kappa at Samford in 2007. On August 26, 2020, Westmoreland announced that he would retire effective June 30, 2021. He was succeeded on July 1, 2021, by Beck A. Taylor, formerly a dean at Samford.

After retiring as president Westmoreland served as executive director of the Frances Marlin Mann Center for Ethics and Leadership at Samford for a period. He remains president emeritus of the university.

== Personal life ==
With his wife Jeanna, Westmoreland has a daughter.

== Works ==
- Westmoreland, Andrew; Springle, Pat (2005). Leading by Design: Follow Jesus' Example in Leading Twelve Types of People. Friendswood, Texas: Baxter Press. ISBN 9781888237535. OCLC 57708022.

Academic offices
Preceded by Thomas E. Corts	Samford University Presidents; 2006 – 2021	Succeeded by Beck A. Taylor
