= Beck A. Taylor =

American academic administrator

Beck Taylor

19th President of Samford University
- Incumbent
- Assumed office July 1, 2021
- Preceded by: Andrew Westmoreland

18th President of Whitworth University
- In office July 1, 2010 – May 31, 2021
- Preceded by: William P. Robinson
- Succeeded by: Scott McQuilkin

Personal details
- Education: Baylor University (BS); Purdue University (MS, PhD)

Beck A. Taylor at the "Religious Freedom and Media Coverage in Higher Education" panel.

Beck A. Taylor is an American academic administrator and economist serving as the 19th president of Samford University, a private Christian university in Birmingham, Alabama. Taylor took office in July 2021, succeeding Andrew Westmoreland.

== Education ==
Taylor earned his undergraduate degree at Baylor University in Texas, studying economics and finance. After graduating, he attended Purdue University, where he earned a Master of Science and Ph.D. in economics.

== Career ==
Taylor began his career as an analyst for Andersen Consulting (now Accenture). He worked as a professor of economics at Baylor University and Samford University. He served as the dean of Samford University's Brock School of Business from 2005 to 2010, as well as an associate dean of research and faculty development at Baylor's Hankamer School of Business. At Samford, Taylor created the Samford Business Network to connect university students with the business community of Birmingham, Alabama.

In 2010, Taylor was selected as the 18th President of Whitworth University, succeeding William P. Robinson. There, he focused on community development and institutional effectiveness, in addition to holding the university's largest fundraising campaign. Following an 11-year tenure at Whitworth, Taylor was elected as the 19th president of Samford University in March 2021, succeeding retiring president Andrew Westmoreland. He assumed office in July 2021. He was formally inaugurated on November 4, 2021, giving an address on love.

== Personal life ==
Taylor and his wife, Julie Taylor, have three children. Their oldest son, Zachary, is a Los Angeles-based musician recording under the name Dreamer Boy. Their daughter, Lauren, earned her Doctor of Medicine degree from the University of Washington School of Medicine, and practices in Nashville. Their youngest daughter Chloe is an undergraduate student at Samford. They are members of Dawson Memorial Baptist Church in Homewood, Alabama.

== Awards and honors ==
- Young Researcher Award from Hankamer School of Business in 2000
- First holder of the W.H. Smith Professorship in Economics in 2000
- Baylor University Outstanding Professor in 2005
