= Sallie Curb Arnold =

American artist from Alabama (1880-1982)

- Born: Sallie McAllister Curb; September 13, 1880; Perry County, Alabama
- Died: 23 April 1982 (aged 101); Annandale, Virginia

Sallie McAllister Curb Arnold (September 12, 1880 – April 23, 1982) was an American artist and educator from Alabama. A graduate of Judson College, she was the wife of a Baptist minister and taught on the faculty of Livingston Normal College (now the University of West Alabama). Her work is in the collections of multiple American art museums.

== Life and career ==
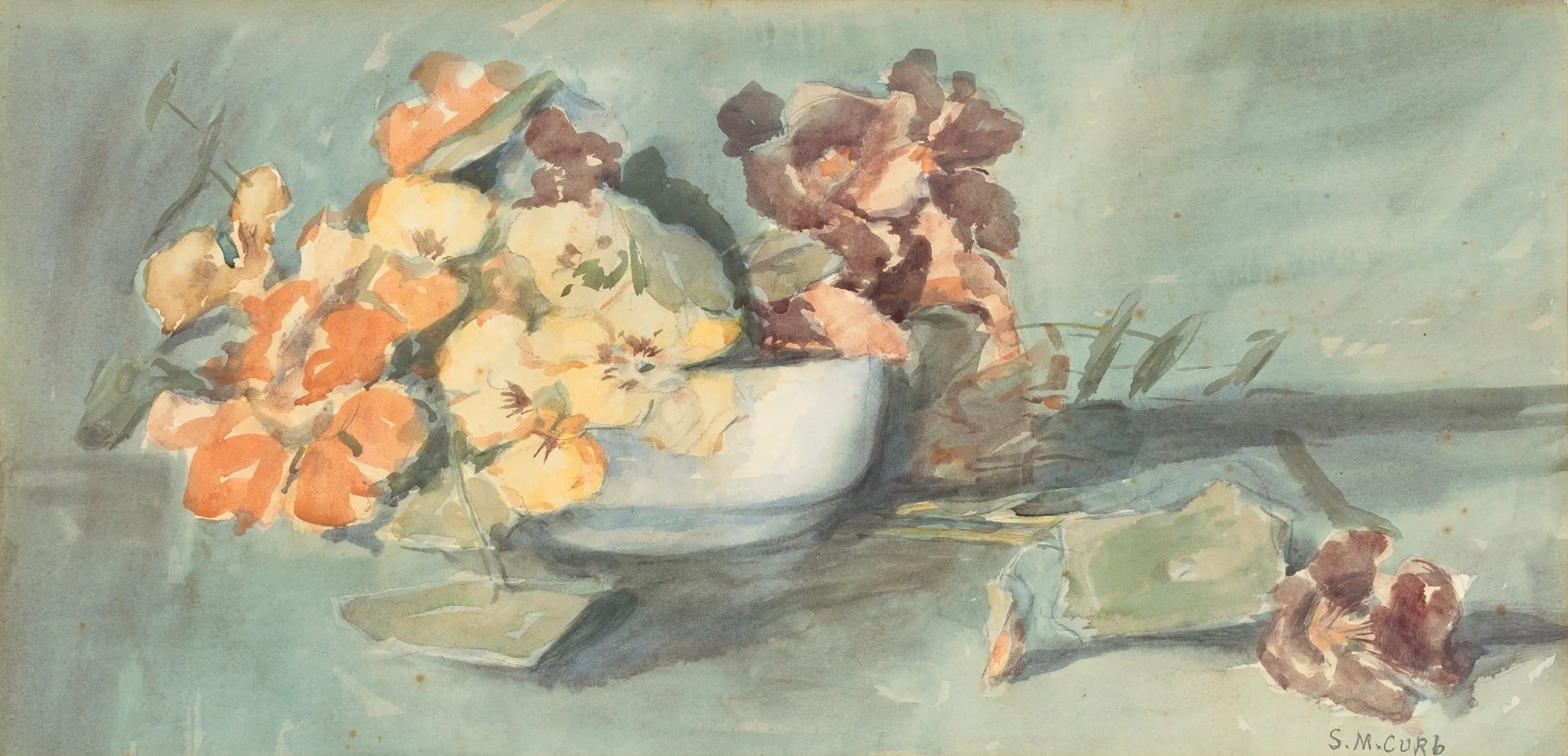
Nasturtiums (1900) by Sallie Curb Arnold

Sallie McAllister Curb was born in Perry County, Alabama on September 12, 1880. Her father, John T. Curb, was a Confederate veteran from Brush Creek, and worked as a commissioner of Perry County. She grew up in Marion, Alabama. She graduated from Judson College in 1899, and was posthumously honored as an outstanding alumna in 1985. In 1902 she joined the teaching staff of Marin Academy in the Greensboro Separate School District in Greensboro, Alabama, and by 1903 she was working as an assistant instructor of art at her alma mater, Judson College. She then worked as an art teacher at the Fourth District Agricultural School in Sylacauga, Alabama. In 1905 she joined the art faculty of Livingston Normal College (now the University of West Alabama).

Sallie married Herman Ross Arnold in 1907. Her husband was a Baptist minister, and the couple settled initially in McKinley, Alabama where he was employed as a pastor at the time. He then ministered at a church in Athens, Alabama for two and a half years before relocating with Sallie to Lafayette, Alabama to take a position as pastor in 1913. In 1918 he left that post to become pastor of the Baptist Church in Greenville, Alabama where he was still serving in 1931. He spent the last thirteen years of his career pastoring a church in Jacksonville, Alabama, and died in 1953. Sally and Herman had three children: Margaret, Ross, and Wyatt.

Sallie was artistically active in Jacksonville, Alabama, where she lived until 1972 when she moved to Annandale, Virginia . In 1980, in honor of her 100th birthday, Smithsonian American Art Museum exhibited her painting Nasturtiums; a work which remains a part of the museum's collection. Her work is also part of the collection of the Birmingham Museum of Art.

Sallie Curb Arnold died in Annandale, Virginia on April 23, 1982 at the age of 101. Her great granddaughter is the artist Margaret Griffith.
