= Alexander Travis =

Alexander Travis (23 August 1790 – 2 December 1852) was a Baptist preacher and a prominent member of the Alabama Baptist State Convention. His nephew William Barret Travis was Texas commander at the Battle of the Alamo in 1836.

Travis was born on 23 August 1790 and grew up in Edgefield County, South Carolina, where his father was a farmer. Noted for his ability for hard work, after his conversion to the Baptist faith in 1809 he became equally noted for his religious fervor. He was licensed to preach and served several churches while continuing to farm. With a dominant personality, he was recognized as head of the family although his brother Mark Travis was seven years older. Travis traveled to Alabama in 1817 and the next year decided to move the entire family to Conecuh County, where they helped found the communities of Sparta and Evergreen.

For many years Travis was a director of the Evergreen College, a Baptist stronghold in Alabama, where he enrolled his nephew William Barret. He later was appointed pastor of the Clairborne Baptist Church, resigning in 1831. Hosea Holcombe in his A history of the rise and progress of the Baptists in Alabama states that Travis had been pastor of the Beulah Church (also known as Murder Creek Baptist Church) in Conecuh county for more than twenty years. He had earlier engaged in missionary work in the state, and had helped found a number of churches. Travis was pastor of the Murder Creek congregation and others until his death in 1852.
