= William P. Robinson =

American academic administrator (born 1949)

William Robinson

17th President of Whitworth University
- In office 1993–2010
- Succeeded by: Beck A. Taylor

President of Manchester University
- In office 1986–1993

Personal details
- Born: 1949 (age 76–77) Elmwood, Illinois, U.S.
- Education: University of Northern Iowa (BA); Wheaton College (MA); University of Pittsburgh (PhD)

William P. "Bill" Robinson is an American academic administrator and communications scholar who served as the 17th President of Whitworth University in Spokane, Washington from 1993 to 2010.

== Early life and education ==
Robinson was born in 1949 in Elmwood, Illinois. Robinson is a graduate of the University of Northern Iowa and Wheaton College, and earned a doctorate from the University of Pittsburgh.

== Career ==
Robinson has also served as chairman of the Spokane Regional Chamber of Commerce. He has written two books on leadership, and distributes a monthly newsletter entitled "Of Mind & Heart". Robinson served as President of Manchester University from 1986 to 1993.

In 2015, Robinson received the Senator Mark O. Hatfield Leadership Award from the Council for Christian Colleges and Universities.
