= Leslie Stephen Wright =

Leslie Stephen Wright (1913–1997) was an American educator. He served as the President of Samford University in Birmingham, Alabama from 1958 to 1983.

== Biography ==
=== Early life ===
He was born in Birmingham, Alabama in 1913. He received a B.A. in 1936 and an M.A. in 1939, both from the University of Louisville in Kentucky.

=== Career ===
From 1936 to 1941, he taught in schools in Kentucky and Alabama. In 1941, he worked for DuPont and, in 1942, for the War Production Board. He served as the state director for the Civilian Production Administration and the Alabama Savings Bond division of the United States Department of the Treasury from 1947 to 1950. From 1950 to 1954, he worked for Democratic Senator J. Lister Hill. From 1954 to 1958, he was executive secretary of the Baptist Foundation of Alabama.

He served as President of Samford University from 1958 to 1983. From 1964 to 1965, he served as the seventeenth President of the Alabama Historical Association. He was also President of the Alabama Writers Conclave from 1965 to 1967. He was a member of the National Education Association, the Association of American Colleges, the American Council on Education, the Southern Association of Colleges and Secondary Schools, and the Association of Southern Baptist Colleges and Schools. He also belonged to the Rotary Club and the American Legion. He served on the Alabama Selection Committee for Rhodes Scholars, the Alabama Educational Television Commission, and the National Trust for Historic Preservation.

He was awarded honorary degrees by Auburn University and the University of Alabama. The Leslie S. Wright Fine Arts Center at Samford University is named in his honor.

=== Personal life ===
He was married to Lolla Catherine Wurtele, and they had two sons, Leslie Stephen and John King.

== Bibliography ==
- The Origin and History of the Louisville and Portland Canal (1939)
- Henry Ford and Muscle Shoals (1960)
- Samford University: From Far Belt to Space Age (1969)

Academic offices
Preceded by Harwell Goodwin Davis	Samford University Presidents; 1958–1983	Succeeded by Thomas E. Corts
