= Hosea Holcombe =

Alabama Baptist minister (1780–1841)

Hosea Lot Holcombe (1780–1841) was Alabama's first church historian, as noted on his marker in Bessemer, Alabama. He was a Baptist evangelist and missionary, who moved from the Carolinas to Alabama in 1818; and was President of the Alabama Baptist Convention from 1833 to 1838.

Asked to write a history of the church, Holcombe traveled throughout the state collecting material for his History of Rise and Progress of the Baptists in Alabama, published in 1840 a year before his death.

Lot Holcombe was born near Cross Keys, Union District, South Carolina on July 20, 1780, and assumed his father's name of Hosea when his father died in 1789. He married his first cousin, Cassandra Jackson, on June 7, 1801. He was licensed to preach, and was ordained as a Baptist minister about 1805. Holcombe was influenced to dedicate his life to evangelistic leadership of the Baptists by the Rev. Luther Rice, whom he met in 1816. In 1818 he moved to Jefferson County, Alabama where he joined Cannon Baptist Church in old Jonesboro. He served as pastor of Ruhama Baptist Church 1819-1821, and subsequently was pastor of several other churches, some of which he helped establish. He was pastor of the Rock Creek Baptist Church between 1822 and 1828, while also preaching at other churches during the same period.

Holcombe was one of the founders of the Alabama Baptist State Convention in 1823, and was its president from 1833 to 1838. He deplored factional struggles between the Alabama Baptists, and insisted on the need to maintain doctrinal purity. In the preface to his book, he notes that he was requested to undertake the work by the Alabama Baptist State Convention in 1834, and urged to continue over the ensuing years in which he traveled 4,000 or 5,000 miles and wrote about 600 letters to obtain material.
