= Joseph Lanier Jr. =

Joseph Lanier Jr. (February 9, 1932 — August 11, 2021) was an American heir and businessman.

His great–grandfather, LaFayette Lanier, founded the Alabama and Georgia Manufacturing Company in 1866. By 1882, it became known as the West Point Manufacturing Company. It specialized in sails for clipper ships and cotton covers for the Conestoga wagons that crossed the prairies. In the 1980s, Joseph Lamar Lanier Jr. took over, focusing on brand-name product lines such as Lady Pepperell sheets and towels and Cabin Crafts carpets. In 1989, he reluctantly sold it to William F. Farley, Chairman of Farley, Inc., and received US$4 million in golden parachute.

From November 1989 to August 2006, he served as Chairman of the Board of Dan River, Inc., a textile company headquartered in Danville, Virginia. From 1980 to April 29, 2010, he also served on the boards of the Torchmark Corporation. He served on the board of Alliance One International (formerly known as DIMON), a leaf tobacco merchant, from 1995 to 2006. He has served on the Boards of Waddell & Reed and SunTrust Banks.

He is a member of the Augusta National Golf Club.

He died on August 11, 2021.
