= Sigma Alpha Epsilon =

North American collegiate fraternity

- ΣΑΕ
- Founded: March 9, 1856; 170 years ago University of Alabama
- Type: Social
- Affiliation: NIC
- Status: Active
- Scope: National (US)
- Motto: Phi Alpha
- Colors: Royal purple and Old gold
- Symbol: Lion
- Flag
- Flower: Violet
- Patron Roman deity: Minerva
- Publication: The Phi Alpha; The Record
- Chapters: 215 Active
- Colonies: 21
- Members: 15,000 active 362,500+ lifetime
- Headquarters: 1856 Sheridan Road; Evanston, Illinois 60208; United States
- Website: sae.net

Sigma Alpha Epsilon (ΣΑΕ) is a North American Greek-letter social college fraternity. It was founded at the University of Alabama in Tuscaloosa, Alabama, on March 9, 1856. Of all existing national social fraternities, Sigma Alpha Epsilon is the only one founded in the Antebellum South. Its national headquarters, the Levere Memorial Temple, was established next to the campus of Northwestern University in Evanston, Illinois, in 1926. The fraternity's mission statement is "To promote the highest standards of friendship, scholarship, and service for our members throughout life."

The fraternity has chapters and emerging chapters in 50 states and provinces as of 2011.

Sigma Alpha Epsilon had eleven deaths linked to drinking, drugs and hazing between 2006 and 2013, more than any other Greek organization in the United States, according to data compiled by Bloomberg News. During the 2010s, at least 18 Sigma Alpha Epsilon chapters were suspended, closed, or banned. In March 2014, the fraternity announced that it was eliminating the tradition of pledging following these deaths and other hazing incidents.

== History ==
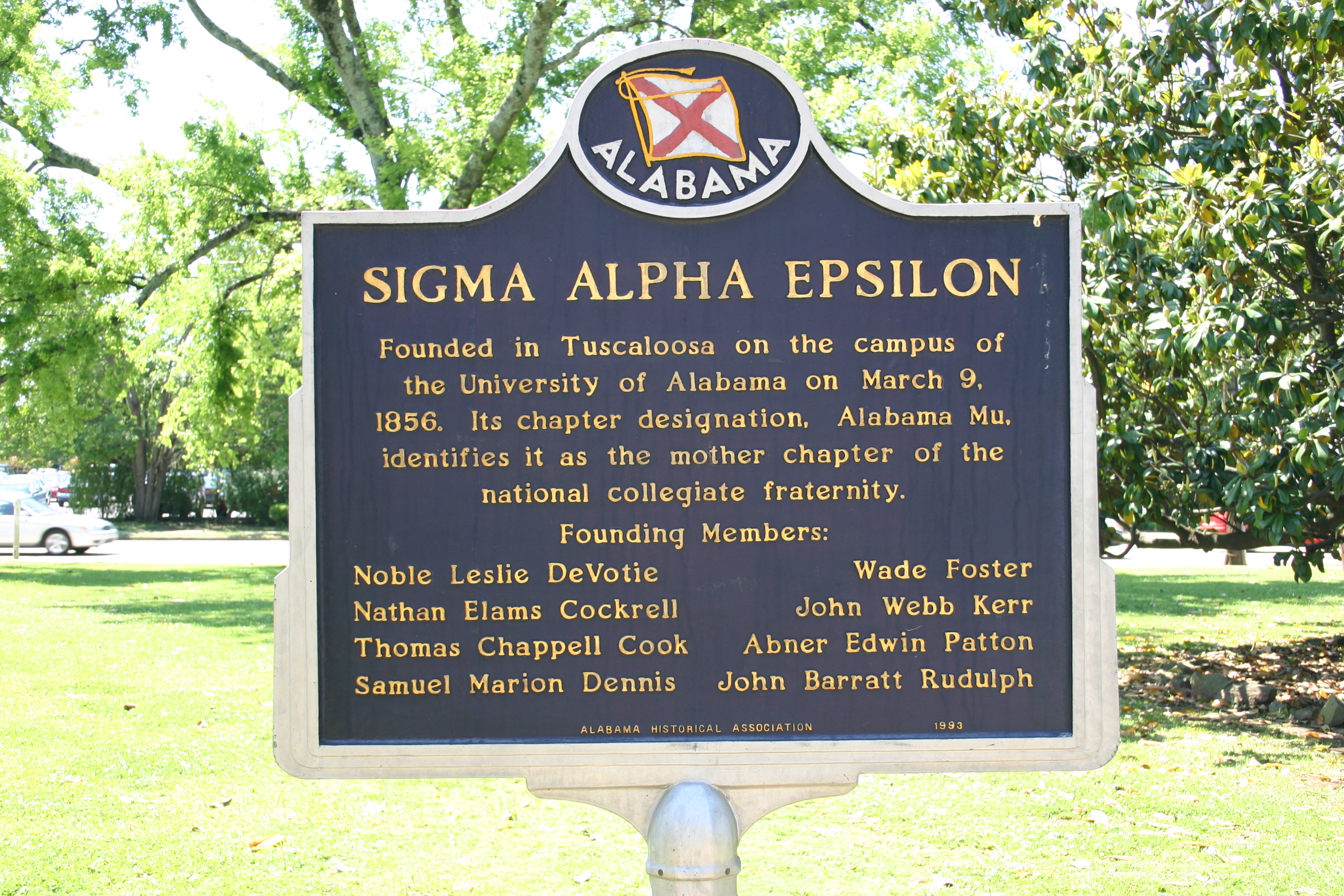
Historical marker about the founders of Sigma Alpha Epsilon on the campus of the University of Alabama in Tuscaloosa

Sigma Alpha Epsilon was founded on March 9, 1856, at the University of Alabama in Tuscaloosa, Alabama. Its founders were Noble Leslie DeVotie, Nathan Elams Cockrell, Samuel Marion Dennis, John Barrett Rudulph, Abner Edwin Patton, Wade Hampton Foster, Thomas Chappell Cook, and John Webb Kerr. Their leader was DeVotie, who wrote the ritual, created the grip, and chose the name. Rudulph designed the fraternity badge. Of all existing national social fraternities, Sigma Alpha Epsilon is the only national fraternity founded in the Antebellum South.

Patton was selected as the fraternity's first president. In the fall of 1854, Patton was the only Sigma Alpha Epsilon founder still enrolled at the university and continued to serve as its president. His efforts led to the expansion of the fraternity to the University of Nashville (now Vanderbilt University), Union College, and the University of North Carolina at Chapel Hill in January and February 1857. By the end of 1857, the fraternity had grown to seven chapters. Its first national convention met in the summer of 1858 at Murfreesboro, Tennessee, with four of its eight chapters in attendance.

By the time the American Civil War began in 1861, fifteen chapters had been established. The fraternity had fewer than 400 members when the Civil War began. Of those, 370 went to war for the Confederate States and seven for the Union Army. Seventy-four members of the fraternity lost their lives in the war, including founders Dennis, DeVotie, and Patton.

Fraternal history notes that Noble Leslie DeVotie was the first person to die in the Civil War, though this is in dispute. DeVotie lost his footing while boarding a steamer at Fort Morgan, Alabama, on February 12, 1861, hit his head and drowned. His body washed ashore three days later. He is recognized by the State of Alabama as the first Alabama Soldier to die in the Civil War.

After the Civil War, a small chapter at Columbian College, which is now George Washington University in Washington, D.C., was the only chapter to survive.

When a few of the young veterans returned to the Georgia Military Institute in Marietta, Georgia, and found their college burned to the ground, they decided to enter the University of Georgia in Athens. The chapter there, which was established at the end of 1865, along with the reestablishment of a chapter at the University of Virginia in Charlottesville, led to the fraternity's revival. Soon, other chapters came back to life and, in 1867, the first post-war convention was held in Nashville, where a half-dozen revived chapters planned the fraternity's future growth.

In the 1870s and early 1880s, more than a score of new chapters were formed. Older chapters died as fast as new ones were established. By 1886, the fraternity had chartered 49 chapters, but few were active. The first chapter north of the Mason Dixon Line had been established at Pennsylvania College (now Gettysburg College in Gettysburg, Pennsylvania), in 1883, and a second was placed at Mount Union College in Alliance, Ohio two years later.

== Symbols ==
Sigma Alpha Epsilon's colors are royal purple and old gold. Its symbol is the lion. Its flower is the violet. The fraternity's Roman divinity is Minerva.

== Levere Memorial Temple ==
The Levere Memorial Temple in Evanston, IL.

The fraternity's international headquarters, also known as the Fraternity Service Center, is maintained at the Levere Memorial Temple in Evanston, Illinois. The fraternity approved a plan to construct a national headquarters at its 1920 convention and its design was approved at the 1928 convention. It was built between mid-1929 and 1930, and was dedicated on December 28, 1930. The building was named for member William Levere who left $25,000 in his will to the fraternity.

The Levere Memorial Temple serves as a war memorial for fraternities members and houses a museum on the first floor with a collection of historical photographs, pictures, and collections from private sources.

== The Diomedians ==
At one point, the fraternity had an alumni affiliate called the Diomedians. This organization was founded in 1918 in New York City, and its ritual was first "exemplified" in May 1919 and a National Council with the power to grant charters was established that June. A convention in St. Louis a year and a half later incorporated the Diomedians into the organizational structure of the fraternity and created the "Diomedian degree". By 1923 Diomedian chapters were established in Michigan and Pittsburgh and a Diomedian club-house "designed to furnish a modest home for young men just out of college" was established at 51 West 48th Street in New York.

== Member and chapter misconduct ==
=== Hazing and alcohol related deaths and injuries ===
Sigma Alpha Epsilon has had nine deaths linked to drinking, drugs and hazing since 2006, more than any other Greek organization, according to data compiled by Bloomberg News in 2013. More than 100 chapters have been disciplined since 2007, with at least fifteen suspended or closed since 2010. A potential initiate to the SAE chapter at Salisbury University in Maryland alleged that Justin Stuart was beaten with a paddle, forced to drink alcohol to the point of losing consciousness and confined in a basement for nine hours without access to food, water or a bathroom while being subjected to music torture, an experience described as being "almost like Guantanamo Bay". The allegations were verified by a university investigation that led to the suspension of the chapter on the grounds that it had violated Salisbury policies on alcohol, hazing, and threats or acts of violence.

In May 2013, members of the Arizona State chapter allegedly left an underage member outside a hospital with a note saying "Ive [sic] been drinking and I need some help." The 20-year-old survived after nearly 20 shots of tequila resulting in a near lethal blood alcohol content of 0.47%, according to doctors.

In 2017, the University of Nevada, Reno suspended the Reno chapter of SAE due to allegations of hazing and underage drinking. The university ultimately voted to remove SAE's recognition for four years. As of 2023, the University of Nevada, Reno still does not recognize SAE, with that chapter still working towards recognition.

As a result of these incidents, student members pay among the highest rates for liability insurance of any fraternity. In March 2014, JPMorgan Chase stopped managing an investment account of SAE's charitable foundation, with bad publicity from hazing as the likely cause. In January 2019, a newly-initiated freshman member of the chapter at the University of California, Irvine died from alcohol poisoning with allegations of fraternity hazing rituals still under investigation.

In 2012, the national fraternity organization responded to hazing allegations, stating that it has "zero tolerance for hazing", and that the reported infractions represent a low percentage of its more than 219 chapters and 15,000 college members. Following the 2011 hazing-related death of a Cornell University sophomore who was blindfolded, bound and encouraged to ingest more alcohol as part of a drinking game. After passing out he was transported back to the fraternity house and left unsupervised on a couch where he died. A constitutional amendment to ban alcohol at all chapter houses was proposed at the 155th national conference, but the measure failed to reach the two-thirds majority needed.

In March 2014 the fraternity revised its membership process to replace the term "pledge" with "new member" and require that initiation be completed within 96 hours of new members receiving bids. The SAE national president cited efforts to combat hazing, treat all members of the fraternity equally, and to protect the reputation of the fraternity as primary reasons for the change.

On November 8 2026, the SAE chapter at The Ohio State University (OSU) was placed on "interim suspension" after multiple videos circulated online showing two individuals related to the chapter roughhousing one another while on fire. The videos, which were filmed the day prior of the suspension, showed one individual laying on the ground, with their pantlegs set on fire. Soon after, the individual charged and tackled another individual in a manner similar to that of the Oklahoma drill. The audience watching them can be seen trying to put out the fire on both their clothing and nearby terrain, by smothering and a fire extinguisher. The incident, which occurred a day prior to the suspension, occurred on the 1900 Block of Indianola Avenue, where the SAE chapter house is located. Spokesmen of OSU, the Columbus Police Department, as well as the Columbus Fire Department stated that they were not notified of what occurred until the day after via a 911 call. The two individuals in the video were rushed in private vehicles to a local hospital sometime after November 8 2026 after sustaining second- and third-degree burn injuries, both in stable condition. The University enacted the interim suspension soon after learning about the event. There is evidence showing that hazing played a part in the incident.

=== Sexual assault and harassment ===
According to several campus newspapers and the 2015 documentary The Hunting Ground, students commonly joke that SAE stands for "Sexual Assault Expected" because of the many members who have been accused of sexual assault.

In 2012, an incident of alleged sexual misconduct involving a member at Louisiana State University (LSU) with a freshman girl occurred. Also that same year, the LSU chapter was accused of severely beating pledges. The chapter was suspended until January 2015.

In 2014, a rape allegedly took place at an SAE party at Loyola Marymount University. The national organization reacted by closing the chapter.

In December 2014, Stanford University announced a two-year suspension of SAE housing due to reports of sexual harassment. After a second university investigation found that members had deterred a student from filing a Title IX concern and had intimidated and harassed another student believed to have filed a Title IX complaint, the chapter's housing was "indefinitely" revoked in May 2015.

In January 2015, a victim was hospitalized following allegations of sexual assault at a party at a SAE Iowa State University party. The incident was investigated by police and the chapter suspended the member suspected of the assault.

In March 2015, Johns Hopkins University suspended the local SAE chapter until Spring 2016 after an alleged sexual assault at one of their parties.

The Yale University chapter was temporarily banned from using the university email and bulletin board system as well as association of the fraternity name and the university following "inappropriate comments" made by SAE members.

In February 2017, the SAE chapter at Northwestern University was suspended indefinitely after four women alleged they were given date rape drugs at an SAE party, and two stated they were later sexually assaulted.

In August 2018, the SAE National Fraternity and the chapter at the University of California, Los Angeles were sued for negligence after a member of the Zeta Beta Tau (ZBT) Fraternity assaulted a woman at an SAE event. The lawsuit also encompassed the ZBT fraternity as well as UCLA.

=== Alcohol, drug, and safety violations ===
The founding chapter at the University of Alabama was suspended in 1988 on cocaine-trafficking charges and for violating the university's code against drug use and trafficking. The suspension was lifted in 1990, but with a checklist of improvement goals that the chapter was required to fulfill; in 1992, the chapter was suspended again for failing to meet the outlined goals.

In the fall of 1991, the University of Houston chapter was suspended when the fraternity's president bit off a finger of a female guest's hand during an altercation with her boyfriend at a party held at the fraternity house.

In 1997, the Louisiana State University chapter was suspended after one member died from alcohol poisoning. Another member was praised for rescuing more than a dozen of his passed out brothers from death by ferrying them to the nearest hospital single-handedly.

The chapter at Southern Methodist University was placed on "deferred suspension" following a drug-related death in 2006, and then again for abuse and hazing that occurred in 2017.

In spring 2012, the Miami University chapter of SAE was suspended after an early morning "fireworks battle" with the neighboring Phi Kappa Tau house led to Oxford police seizing considerable amounts of drug paraphernalia from both houses. Since the groups were temporarily unrecognized while on suspension, sophomores who were living there under fraternity exemption from Miami's two-year campus housing policy were required to vacate the houses and move on campus. As a result, SAE's national organization sued Miami for $10 million, claiming "severe emotional distress" and "substantial lost income and reputation" for the exiled students. Susan Dlott, judge of the Southern District of Ohio, dismissed SAE's lawsuit in February 2013 with prejudice (meaning it could not be refiled), saying that "...the fraternity failed to submit any facts that supported its claims the public university violated its constitutional rights against unreasonable search and seizure and due process." In November 2015, the Miami SAE chapter was allowed to recolonize by Miami's Interfraternity Council.

In 2013, the chapter at Arizona State University was banned from campus due to repeated hazing and alcohol violations and questionable behavior. Jack Culolias, an ASU freshman and SAE pledge, was kicked out of a bar one night then later found dead in a ditch. The chapter also faced heavy scrutiny when a member nearly died after participating in a tequila drinking contest.

In July 2015, the University of Richmond (Virginia) chapter was suspended indefinitely "based on repeated incidents that violated the University's policies and risk management procedures." An investigation had been opened in April, when the national organization suspended the chapter after two women were hurt falling from a balcony during a ski trip.

In April 2016, the UMBC chapter was suspended after allegations of alcohol policy violations, property theft and damage, and failure to comply with previous sanctions (also handed for underage drinking, in a party that resulted in 55 police citations). The University's Student Judicial Board determined that the claims were substantiated, and suspended the chapter for four years.

In November 2017, the SAE chapter at the University of Texas at Austin was suspended for hazing violations. Two years prior, several members from the chapter were accused of beating up a male neighbor complaining about loud music that was playing at their fraternity house during a recruitment event. Only two members were identified and charged with physical assault for the incident. This prompted the chapter to disaffiliate from SAE. The chapter retained the fraternity house and is regulated by its alumni board.

In January 2019, the SAE chapter at the University of California, Irvine was suspended after the death of a freshman newly initiated member of the fraternity. In March 2019, the Orange County coroner's office announced that the death was found to have been caused by alcohol poisoning and the chapter was closed indefinitely amidst allegations of fraternity hazing rituals but the details were still under investigation in March 2019.

In February 2019, the SAE chapter at Tennessee Technological University was placed on suspension for four to five years, or until all current members have graduated or left Tennessee Tech. The closure follows the death of a Tech graduate and former fraternity member, who died one day after attending the "senior transition night", at the SAE house on Dec. 7, 2018.

In December 2021, eight members of the fraternity at Georgia College and State University were arrested for providing alcohol to minors and one member for hazing. The arrests happened after a SAE pledge was hospitalized due to an alcohol related hazing incident.

In June 2022, the SAE chapter at the University of New Hampshire was suspended pending an investigation into a hazing incident that occurred in April. Arrest warrants were issued for 46 members of the chapter, as well as a warrant charging the chapter itself with student hazing. The chapter was taken off of social probation in May 2024.

In January 2024, Texas Rho, the SAE chapter at the University of Texas at Austin, was sued by an Australian exchange student over injuries he sustained from an assault by fraternity members at a party the previous year. The student suffered significant injuries during the attack, including a dislocated leg, broken ligaments, fractured tibia and broken nose, according to the suit. He is suing the fraternity for more than $1 million. The SAE chapter was already suspended at the time of his assault due to previous hazing and safety violations.

In February 2025, the SAE chapter at Miami University was suspended after a report indicated several "inhumane" activities took place at an off-campus property owned by the fraternity involving pledges. One pledge was allegedly coerced and forced into the pledge process, where "he [was] hazed for multiple days and was forced to cut communication with all others." Among the alleged hazing incidents, the pledge was required to ingest an entire can of chewing tobacco and then do a handstand. He vomited as a result and was forced to then consume the vomit. When the pledge reported the incident to another student, he received a text message from an active member threatening to put a "12-gauge down his throat and watch his brain splatter." On February 24, the fraternity chapter was suspended and was under investigation by Miami University officials.

The SAE Chapter at The Ohio State University has been under investigation numerous times and faced seven university-sanctions since 2001. Beginning in 2017, it was revealed by the University's office of student life that the chapter violated multiple student code of conducts rules, as well as hazing and alcohol policies via investigation. The chapter was placed on disciplinary probation, set to last until December 2018. The chapter's probation would be extended from December for multiple years to come after further violations were recorded while the fraternity was on probation. In May 2023, The University's chapter was placed under membership review by the National SAE office, and the chapter's probation was once again extended due to additional violations that were recorded while the fraternity was on probation, stemming from failing to comply with university rules due to alcohol and drug violations. In 2026, the chapter at OSU was placed under interim suspension for hazing incidents and is under investigation.

=== Discriminatory incidents ===
In 1982, SAE members at the University of Cincinnati were suspended for a racially insensitive party corresponding with Martin Luther King Jr.'s birthday.

In 2002, Syracuse University officials suspended the chapter there after a member appeared in blackface. The member was expelled from the university. The chapter returned after the suspension and in 2006 was found guilty of hazing a new member by the University's Office of Fraternity and Sorority Affairs.

In 2013, SAE pledges at Washington University in St. Louis allegedly recited lyrics to Dr. Dre's "Bitches Ain't Shit" in slam poetry form within close proximity of several African-American students in the university's dining hall. Chapter operations were halted for several months while the chapter was put under investigation due to allegations of racist behavior stemming from the incident. The chapter was fully reinstated following the investigation.

In 2014, the chapter at Clemson University hosted a "Cripmas" party in reference to the Southern California-based black American Crips gang. The chapter "suspended all activity indefinitely", according to the SAE national office.

Also, in 2014, SAE members at the University of Arizona were suspended for attacking Alpha Epsilon Pi, a Jewish fraternity.

In March 2015, the national organization of Sigma Alpha Epsilon closed the University of Oklahoma chapter after a video surfaced showing members chanting a song which featured the racial slur, "nigger," and made references to lynching and racial segregation. The chant, set to melody of the popular children's song, "If You're Happy and You Know It", declares, "There will never be a nigger at SAE / There will never be a nigger at SAE / You can hang him from a tree, but he'll never sign with me / There will never be a nigger at SAE." Sigma Alpha Epsilon closed the charter of the involved chapter and suspended its members on March 8, 2015. The University of Oklahoma president, David Boren, simultaneously closed the chapter house, giving members two days to vacate the fraternity's campus dwellings. On March 10, 2015, two students identified in the video were expelled from the university.

In May 2016, the SAE chapter at the University of Wisconsin–Madison was placed on suspension for repeatedly using racist, homophobic, and anti-Semitic slurs, and then ostracizing a black SAE member for speaking up against the chapter's behavior.

== See also ==
- List of social fraternities and sororities
