= Siloam Baptist Church =

- U.S. National Register of Historic Places
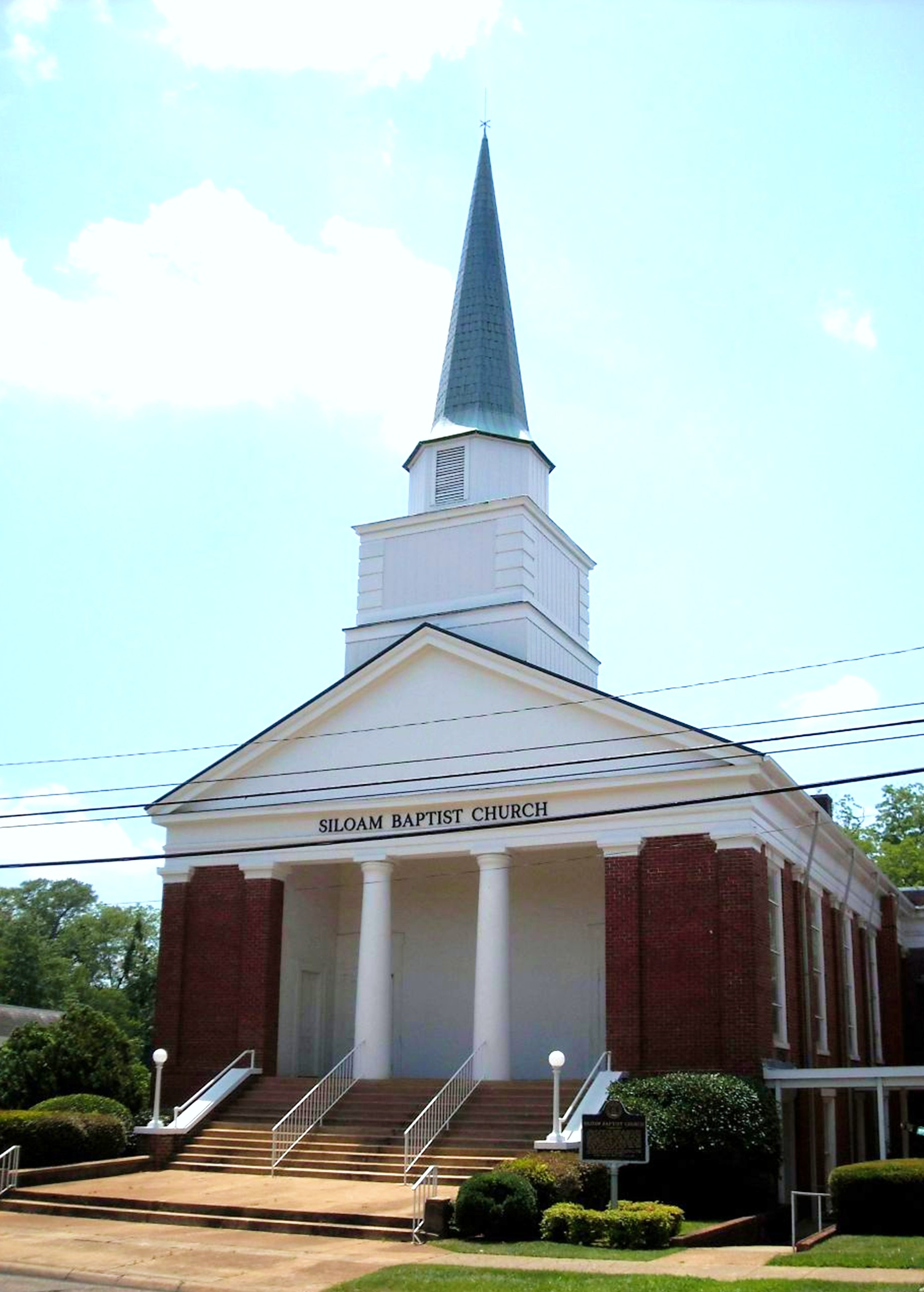
- Siloam Baptist in July 2009

- Location within Alabama Location within the United States
- Location: 503 Washington St., Marion, Alabama
- Coordinates: 32°37′51″N 87°19′10″W
- Area: 0.7 acres (0.28 ha)
- Built: 1848
- Architectural style: Greek Revival
- NRHP reference No.: 82001615
- Added to NRHP: December 27, 1982

The Siloam Baptist Church is a Baptist church in Marion, Alabama, affiliated with the Southern Baptist Convention. The current brick Greek Revival building was completed in 1848.

Members of this church were instrumental in establishing both Judson College in 1838 and Howard College, now Samford University, in 1841.

== See also ==
- Historical Marker Database
