= Samford University =

Christian university in Homewood, Alabama, US

- Former names: Howard College (1841–1965)
- Motto: Deo Doctrinae Aeternitati (Latin) "For God, For Learning, Forever" (prior to 2001) Deo et Doctrinae
- Type: Private university
- Established: 1841; 185 years ago
- Accreditation: SACS
- Religious affiliation: Christian
- Endowment: $539.7 million (2024)
- President: Beck A. Taylor
- Faculty: 450 (full-time teaching faculty)
- Students: 6,522 (fall 2026)
- Undergraduates: 4,575 (fall 2026)
- Postgraduates: 1,947 (fall 2026)
- Location: Homewood, Alabama, United States; 33.4649°N 86.7937°W
- Campus: 247 acres (100 ha); Large suburb
- Newspaper: The Samford Crimson
- Colors: Blue and red
- Nickname: Bulldogs
- Sporting affiliations: NCAA Division I FCS – SoCon
- Mascot: Sam
- Website: samford.edu

Samford University is a private Christian university in Homewood, Alabama, United States. Homewood is an inner-suburb of Birmingham. Samford was founded by Baptists in 1841 as Howard College and located until 1887 in Marion, Alabama. It is governed by an independent board of trustees, which requires board members to be Baptists.

In fall 2025, the university enrolled 6,522 students from 46 states, 1 U.S. territory, and 12 other countries, marking the 18th consecutive record-setting year for enrollment.

== History ==
=== 19th century ===
In 1841, Samford University was founded as Howard College in Marion, Alabama. It was named for the eighteenth-century English philanthropist John Howard. Some of the land was donated by the Reverend James H. DeVotie, who served on the school's board of trustees for fifteen years and as its president for two years. The first financial gift, $4,000, was given by Julia Tarrant Barron and both she and her son also gave land to establish the college. The university also honors the Reverend Milo P. Jewett and Edwin D. King as founders. King and Barron derived much of their wealth, with which they supported the college, from the people they enslaved. The university was established after the Alabama Baptist State Convention decided to build a school for men in Perry County, Alabama. The college's first nine students began studies in January 1842 with a traditional curriculum of language, literature and sciences. In those early years, the graduation addresses of several distinguished speakers were published, including those by Thomas G. Keen of Mobile, Joseph Walters Taylor, Noah K. Davis and Samuel Sterling Sherman. In October 1854, a fire destroyed all of the college's property, including its only building. While the college was still recovering from the fire, the Civil War began. Howard College was converted to a military hospital by the Confederate government in 1863. During this time, the college's remaining faculty offered basic instruction to soldiers recovering at the hospital. For a short period after the war, federal troops occupied the college and sheltered freed slaves on its campus.

In 1865, the college reopened. Jabez Lamar Monroe Curry, an attorney, former US Congressman and Confederate military officer, served as president from 1865 to 1868. He was committed to the cause of broader education, and supported expansion of normal school training.

In 1887, Howard College's board of trustees accepted an offer of land from the East Lake Land Company owned by Robert Jemison, Sr. and relocated the institution to the newly developing community of East Lake, six miles from the center of Birmingham, Alabama. Faculty who remained in Marion formed Marion Military Institute (MMI) on the old campus. MMI continues to operate in Marion.

=== 20th century ===
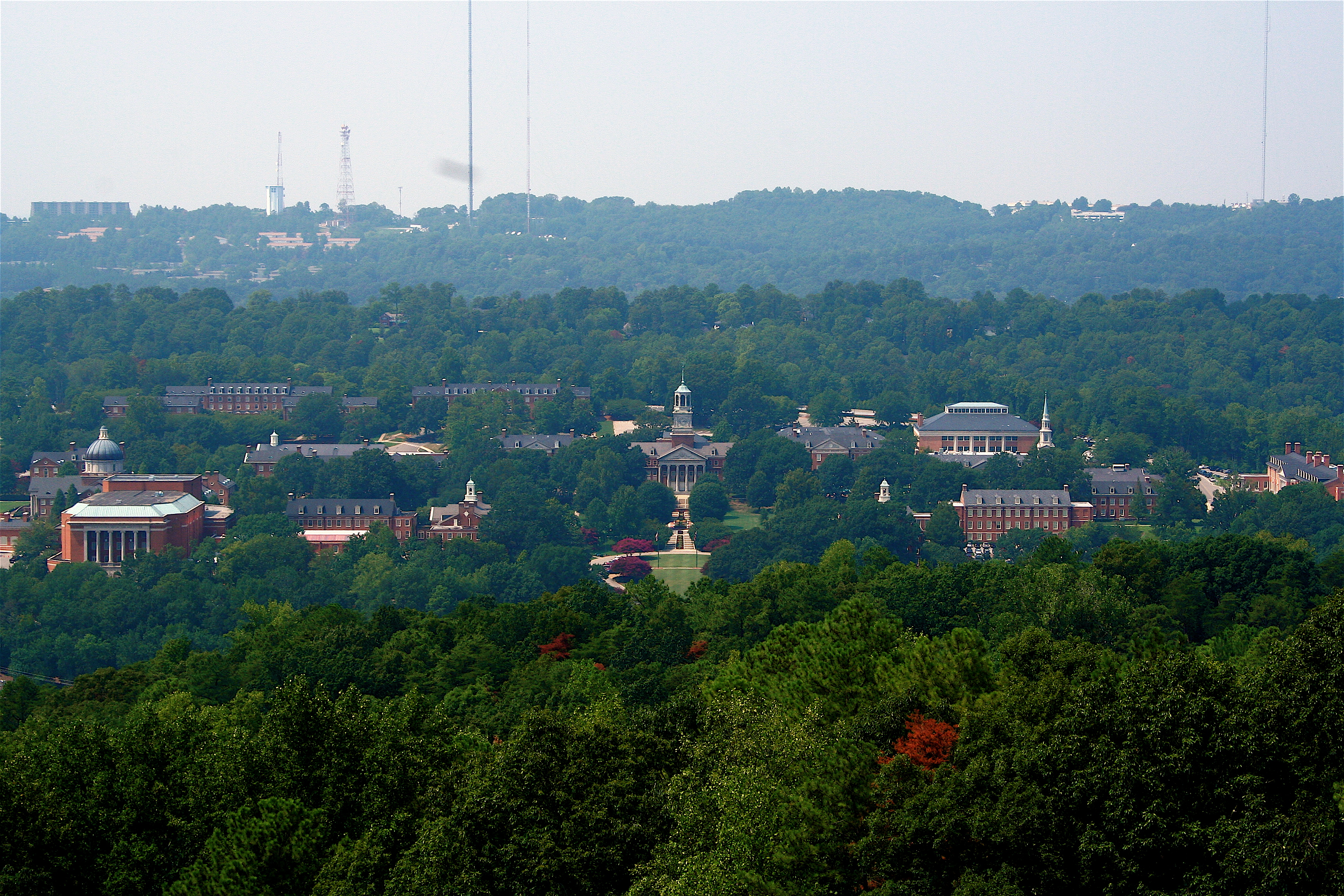
Bird's-eye view of Samford University campus in 2006.

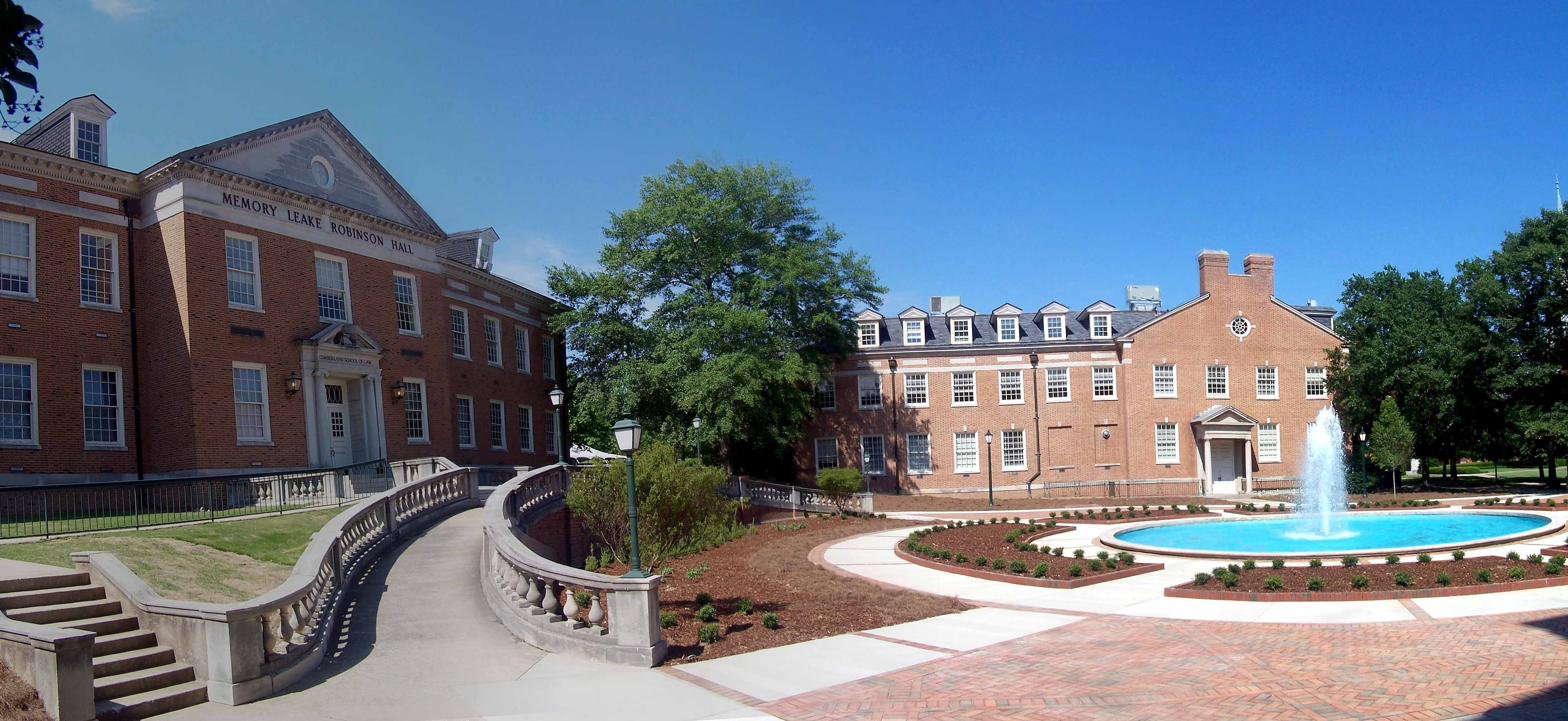
Cumberland School of Law in 2006

In 1913, the college became fully and permanently coeducational. Howard College added its School of Music in 1914 and School of Education and Journalism the following year. The college introduced its Department of Pharmacy in 1927. At the time, it was the only program of its kind in the Southeastern United States. During World War II, Howard College hosted a V-12 Navy College Training Program, allowing enlisted sailors to earn college degrees while receiving military training.

After the war, the number of veterans attending the college under the GI Bill boosted enrollment beyond capacity. The college moved to Shades Valley, adjacent to the one-time Edgewood Lake in Homewood, Alabama. Construction on the new campus began in 1955. It opened in 1957. In 1961, the college acquired Cumberland School of Law, one of the nation's oldest law schools.

In addition to the law school, Howard College added a new school of business and reorganized to achieve university status in 1965. Since the name "Howard University" was already in use by a school in Washington, D.C., Howard College was renamed as "Samford University" in honor of Frank Park Samford, a longtime trustee of the school. In 1973, the university acquired Ida V. Moffett School of Nursing. Samford University established a study center in 1984 for students to study abroad in the South Kensington district of London, England.

On September 21, 1989, a Samford University professor, William Lee Slagle, fatally stabbed one of his debating team students and escaped. Slagle was finally captured six months later.

In 1994, Samford's board of trustees voted to allow the board to elect its own members. This gave the university formal independence from the Alabama Baptist State Convention, but until 2017 convention leaders retained ex officio seats on the board, were consulted on trustee selection, and the new trustees were presented to the convention for affirmation. Convention leaders are still invited to the board's meetings. The university's corporate expression of faith commitment remains The Statement of the Baptist Faith and Message of 1963, without amendment.

==== Civil rights ====
As a private, segregated institution, Samford University was to some degree insulated from the activities of leaders and protesters of the Civil Rights Movement in the 1950s and early 1960s. The officers of the Samford Student Government Association challenged a segregated concert held on campus by the Birmingham Symphony by inviting as guests the student government officers of nearby Miles College, a historically black school.

Segregation by private universities was outlawed by the 1964 Civil Rights Act. Initially, the school's leaders declined to express their commitment to desegregation. For example, the university declined to apply for the NDEA Student Loan Program for 1965-66 because it would have to affirm desegregation. Cumberland School of Law faced the greatest immediate risk of losing accreditation. In 1967, it admitted Samford's first black student, Audrey Lattimore Gaston. The entire university proceeded with desegregation. In the fall of 1969 Elizabeth Sloan Ragland became the first African American student to live on campus. On June 1, 2020, the university announced the installation of a memorial honoring "the sacrifices of many African Americans for the mission and vision of Samford University even in days when their efforts were invisible or barely acknowledged." It specifically named Gaston and an enslaved servant named Harry who died while saving students from the 1854 fire. A public dedication of the memorial was held on February 15, 2022. In 2021, the university announced the creation of a "a four-year cohort experience for leaders among Samford’s multicultural student body" and named it Ragland Scholars in honor of Ragland. In 2024, the university announced a new residence hall would be named in honor of Gaston. In late 2025, Samford closed the Office of Student Success and Diversity which had offered key support for the Ragland Scholars.

=== 21st century ===
Andrew Westmoreland was appointed president of the university in 2006. That year, the Jane Hollock Brock Recital Hall was dedicated as part of the university’s fine arts complex. A new soccer and track facility opened in 2011, part of a decade-long expansion of new athletics facilities that included a tennis center, a basketball arena, a football field house and a softball stadium. For the 2016–17 academic year, the economic and fiscal impacts of the university on Alabama were $424.8 million, 2,424 jobs, $16.1 million in state income and sales taxes, and $6 million in local sales tax. In 2013, the university established a new College of Health Sciences, including the existing Ida V. Moffett School of Nursing and McWhorter School of Pharmacy, and the newly created School of Health Professions and School of Public Health. The dean of the nursing school, Nena Sanders, was named vice-provost of the new college, and after her retirement in 2020 the nursing school was renamed the Moffett & Sanders School of Nursing. In 2013, the university announced the construction of a new facility to house Brock School of Business. In 2014, the West Village residence complex opened. That December, the university purchased the adjacent headquarters of Southern Progress, a subsidiary of Time, Inc. It subsequently made two of the three buildings the home of the College of Health Sciences. It continues to lease the third to publishers.

The university ended its financial connection with the Alabama Baptist State Convention in July 2017 when the trustees announced they would no longer accept funds from the convention. Later that year Samford and the state convention agreed that Samford would no longer present its slate of trustees to the convention for affirmation and that convention officers would no longer have an ex officio position on the board. This ended key aspects of Samford's formal connection to the state convention that had existed for decades. Still, by the trustees’ own rule, all trustees must be members of Baptist churches and 75% must be from Alabama. Samford became a collaborative partner of the Council for Christian Colleges and Universities in 2010 and a governing member in 2026.

In August 2020, Westmoreland announced he would retire on June 30, 2021. On March 10, 2021, it was announced that he will be succeeded by Whitworth University president Beck A. Taylor. Taylor took office on July 1, 2021.

In May 2022, the university received a $100 million gift from the estate of alumnus Marvin Mann. This was the largest single-donor gift ever made to a higher education institution in Alabama.

==== LGBTQ+ rights ====
Samford has been involved in several well publicized incidents in which the university rejected LGBTQ+ students' requests to form student organizations or refused to work with Christian groups that were LGBTQ+ affirming. In 2017, President Westmoreland rejected Samford Together, an organization that sought to create a space for students to discuss topics related to sexual orientation and gender identity “in an open-minded and accepting environment,” even though the organization had been approved by both the Student Government Association and the faculty. SAFE Samford (Students, Alumni, & Friends for Equality) coordinated a letter writing campaign in support of Samford Together and published these letters on its website. SAFE Samford was founded in 2011.

Similar actions occurred again in 2022. In late August, Samford administration “uninvited” representatives of Episcopalian and Presbyterian campus ministries from a campus event because these ministries were affirming of LGBTQ+ individuals. In justifying the move, Vice President of Student Affairs Phil Kimrey stated, “Throughout its history, the university has consistently subscribed to and practiced biblically orthodox beliefs," and "the university has a responsibility to formally partner with ministry organizations that share our beliefs.” On-campus protests against the change included a silent vigil outside a university-wide worship service on September 20. SAFE Samford again coordinated a letter writing campaign. On September 30, President Beck Taylor stated more explicitly in a video message that "we decided to limit Samford’s formal ministry partnerships to churches and to organizations that support Samford’s traditional view of human sexuality and marriage." This ended Samford’s nearly thirty-year relationship with Birmingham Episcopal Campus Ministries. In October, Taylor declined university recognition to a chapter of OUTLaw at Samford's Cumberland School of Law. OUTLaw is a national organization supporting LGBTQ+ law students.

As of 2023, an off-campus student group, Samford Prism, had been formed to support LGBTQ+ students. SAFE Samford also continues to advocate on behalf of students.

== Academics ==
Academic rankings

National
- Forbes: 169
- U.S. News & World Report: 143
- WSJ/College Pulse: 170

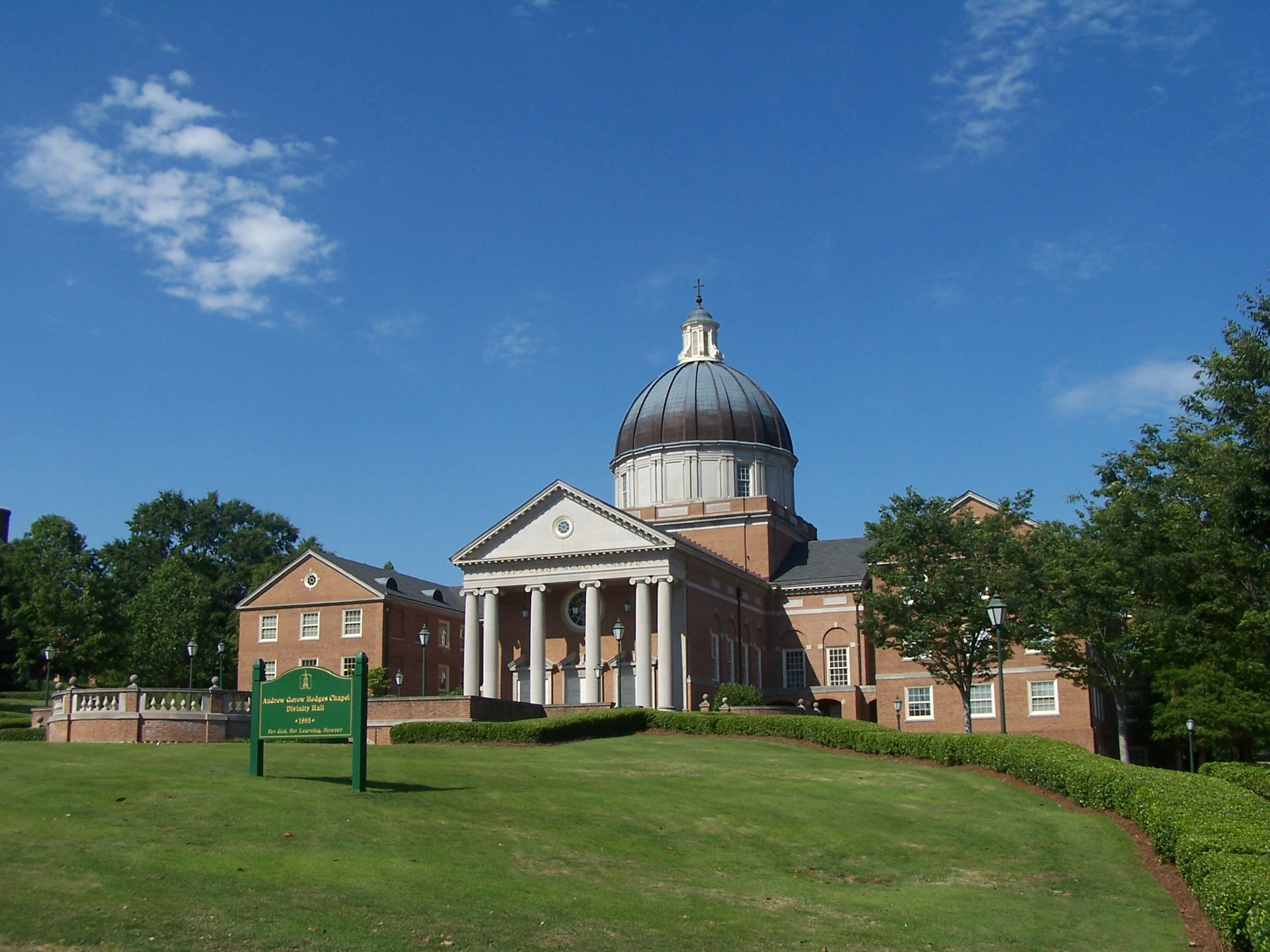
Beeson Divinity School

Samford, a Christian university, offers undergraduate and graduate degree programs, with 178 undergraduate majors, minors and concentrations. The university is divided into the School of the Arts, Howard College of Arts and Sciences, Brock School of Business, Beeson Divinity School, Orlean Beeson School of Education, Cumberland School of Law, Moffett & Sanders School of Nursing, McWhorter School of Pharmacy, School of Health Professions, and School of Public Health. The faculty-to-student ratio at Samford University is 1:14. Approximately two-thirds of the university's classes have fewer than 20 students.

In 2025, Samford ranked No. 20 on Niche's list of "Best Christian Colleges in America," the same year the university ranked 35th nationally in U.S. News & World Report's list for Best Undergraduate Teaching. Samford ranked highest among all colleges and universities in Alabama in Best Value, at No. 105 nationally, per U.S. News & World Report.

=== Admissions ===
In 2023, the college accepted 83.3% of applicants, with those admitted having an average 3.8 GPA and an average 1160 SAT score or average 26 ACT score.

== Campus ==
Samford has moved four times during its history. Originally, Howard College was located in Marion, Alabama, a black-belt town between Selma and Tuscaloosa; it was later the birthplace of Coretta Scott King. The college moved twice in the town. Its second campus is now the home of Marion Military Institute. In 1887, the college moved to the East Lake community in Birmingham across the street from Ruhama Baptist Church. The university is now located approximately 5 miles (8 km) south of downtown Birmingham in Homewood, Alabama's Shades Valley along Lakeshore Drive in Homewood, just 2 miles (3 km) from Interstate 65. It is built in the Georgian Colonial style based on Colonial Williamsburg as envisioned by Lena Vail Davis, wife of then President Harwell Davis when the campus was moved to the Shades Valley area of Jefferson County in 1953-57. The campus location was chosen in consultation with Olmsted Brothers, the famous Massachusetts-based landscape design firm. Most elements of its initial site plan, however, were not included in the final plan by the Birmingham architectural firm Van Keuren & Davis. This firm, known has Davis Architects since 1986, has designed almost all buildings on the campus.

In 1983, the university established a study center in London, England, to facilitate students studying abroad. Named the Daniel House, the center is located at 12 Ashburn Gardens in South Kensington and hosts 15-24 students each semester.

In 2014, the university purchased the campus of the Southern Progress Corporation which borders its main campus to the east. (The land had originally been part of Samford's undeveloped campus and was previously sold by Samford to Southern Progress.) The three huge buildings on the former Southern Progress campus are strikingly modern in their architecture and nestled among trees. This contrasts with the Georgian Colonial classicism of the central campus.

The president's home is located on in Vestavia Hills, on Shades Mountain, overlooking the campus. Erected earlier as a private home, it was purchased by the university in 2007 and remodeled to serve as a residence and a place for entertaining many guests. It is the only non-contiguous part of the university's Birmingham campus.

In 2021, the university was recognized as a Tree Campus USA by the Arbor Day Foundation for the first time.

When the university purchased its campus site in 1947, it was given the creek bottom south of Lakeshore Drive as a gift by a local syndicate and Jefferson County. This land had been the site of Edgewood Lake until the county drained the lake the previous year. Portions of the land were conveyed to the City of Homewood for a high school (opened 1972) and a soccer park (early 2000s). Over the decades, however, the university's plans for the development of other parts of the former lake bed often were objected to by local residents.

In the late 1990s, a large central section of the former lake bed became University Park which included an independently owned retirement community and a university-owned office building. A section west of the high school was developed as intramural athletic fields. In 2011 a track and soccer facility was added between the office building and the high school. In 2025, the university proposed a mixed-use residential, hotel, and retail complex called Creekside for the site of the track and soccer fields and adjoining lands. This would have increased the housing available to students within walking distance from campus and provided for other amenities typical of a residential university. Community concerns, however, led the university to withdraw the plan.

In 2025, the university announced the purchase of a second international study center, Finca de Samford in the countryside outside of San Jose, Costa Rica.

To keep pace with record enrollment and add campus amenities, Samford completed a $300 million phase of construction on campus in August 2025. This included a 165,000-square-foot student recreation center, two new sorority houses and two freshman residence halls, one of which was named in the memory of Audrey Lattimore Gaston Howard, the first African-American full-time student at Samford.

== Student demographics ==
In 2026, just over 62 percent of students came from outside of Alabama. In 2025, Samford welcomed 132 undergraduate transfer students. The previous year it received 245 transfer students, including 151 from Birmingham-Southern College, which closed in May 2024. In 2025, Samford University enrolled 4,575 undergraduate and 1,947 graduate and professional students. Students from 46 U.S. states and 12 other countries attend Samford, with 76 percent of undergraduate first-year students coming from outside the state of Alabama. 97 percent of all May 2019 undergraduate alumni were employed or enrolled in graduate school or in internships within six months of graduation. 81 percent of May 2015 graduates completed an internship during their time at Samford. During 2015, Samford students completed 716,902 hours of community service.

== Athletics ==
The university fields 17 varsity sports and participates in the NCAA at the Division I level as a member of the Southern Conference. Men's sports include baseball, basketball, cross country, football, golf, tennis and indoor and outdoor track and field. Women's sports include basketball, cross country, golf, soccer, softball, tennis, indoor and outdoor track and field and volleyball.

In May 2024, Samford won the Commissioner's Cup, which goes to the top all-around men's athletics program in the Southern Conference, and the Germann Cup, for the SoCon's top overall women's athletics program. The school also won the graduation success award, marking the first time a SoCon school has swept all three awards in back-to-back years. In May 2025, Samford's women athletics program won a fifth consecutive Germann Cup.

In the NCAA's 2013 report, Samford student-athletes achieved an average Academic Progress Rate of 990, the highest in Alabama. It marked the eighth consecutive year that Samford has been a leader in APR measures, beginning in 2005 when it placed 7th in the nation in the inaugural ranking. The university is one of only 61 schools to have received an NCAA Public Recognition Award for academic excellence in the past eight years.

In 2019, Samford's athletics teams were ranked first in Alabama and the Southern Conference and 18th in the country among all NCAA Division 1 schools for Graduation Success Rate by the NCAA with an average score of 97%. Nine teams posted perfect scores. Samford is first among Division I schools in Alabama and in the Southern Conference.

The Bulldogs have won 87 conference championships since joining the Southern Conference in 2008. In the last 20 years, 28 Samford baseball players have been selected in the Major League Baseball Draft, and 19 Bulldog football players have been chosen in the National Football League Draft. Past student-athletes include national-championship football coaches Bobby Bowden and Jimbo Fisher All-Pro defensive back Cortland Finnegan, NFL standouts include James Bradberry (Carolina Panthers), Michael Pierce (Baltimore Ravens) and Jaquiski Tartt (San Francisco 49ers), and baseball’s Phillip Ervin, who has had success with the Cincinnati Reds.

== Notable alumni ==
University graduates have included U.S. congressmen, seven state governors, two U.S. Supreme Court justices, four Rhodes Scholars, multiple Emmy and Grammy award-winning artists, two national championship football coaches, and recipients of the Pulitzer and Nobel Peace prizes. The university has approximately 60,000 living alumni.
