= Joseph Taylor =

Joseph or Joe Taylor may refer to:

== Missionaries ==
- Joseph Taylor (missionary) (died 1859), London Missionary Society missionary in Gujarat, India
- J. V. S. Taylor (1820–1881), his son, British missionary in India

== Politicians ==
- Joe Taylor (politician), Indiana politician
- Joseph Taylor (colonel) (1752-1815), North Carolina politician and military officer
- Joseph D. Taylor (1830–1899), U.S. representative from Ohio
- Joseph Edward Taylor (1830–1913), Utah politician and undertaker
- Joseph Walters Taylor (1820–1872), Alabama politician and newspaper editor
- Joseph Taylor (died 1746) (c. 1693–1746), British politician
- Joseph Taylor (died 1759) (c. 1679–1759), British lawyer and politician

== Sportsmen ==
- Joseph Taylor (footballer, born 1850) (1850–1888), 1870s Scottish footballer
- Joe Taylor (footballer, 1874-1938), English football centre-half
- Joseph Taylor (cricketer) (1886–1954), Australian cricketer
- Joseph Taylor (rugby league), rugby league footballer who played in the 1900s and 1910s
- Joseph Taylor (wrestler) (1907–1992), British wrestler
- Joe Taylor (infielder) (born 1913), baseball second baseman in the Negro leagues
- Joe Taylor (outfielder) (1926–1993), American professional baseball outfielder
- Joe Taylor (cornerback) (1939–2001), professional American football cornerback
- Joe Taylor (American football coach) (born 1950), retired American football coach
- Joe Taylor (rugby league, born 1975), rugby league footballer who played in the 1990s
- Joe Taylor (rugby league, born 1991), rugby league footballer who played in the 2000s and 2010s
- Joseph Taylor (footballer, born 1996), Australian footballer
- Joe Taylor (footballer, born 2002), English football forward
- Joey Taylor (born 1997), Montserratian footballer

== Academics ==
- Joseph T. Taylor (1913–2000), dean of Indiana University
- Joseph Hooton Taylor Jr. (born 1941), American astrophysicist and Nobel laureate
- Joseph L. Taylor (1941–2016), American mathematician

== Others ==
- Ojo Taylor (Joey Taylor), American bassist, vocalist and keyboardist
- Joseph Taylor (actor) (died 1652), Richard Burbage's successor with the King's Men
- Joseph Taylor (folk singer) (1833–1910), of North Lincolnshire, England
- Joseph Taylor (Medal of Honor) (1837–1912), English soldier who helped the Union army during the American Civil War
- Joseph Taylor (mining engineer) (1858–1942), English–New Zealand miner and clergyman
- Joseph Charles Taylor (died 1837), wine merchant, founder of Taylor, Fladgate, & Yeatman
- Joseph Deems Taylor (1885–1966), American composer, music critic, and promoter of classical music
- Joseph Henry Taylor (1844–1908), American author and frontiersman
- Joseph Pannell Taylor (1796–1864), brother of Zachary Taylor, American Civil War general
- Joseph W. Taylor (1810–1880), physician and Quaker

== See also ==
- Joseph Tayler (disambiguation), several people
