= Christianity in Gujarat =

Minority religion in Gujarat, India

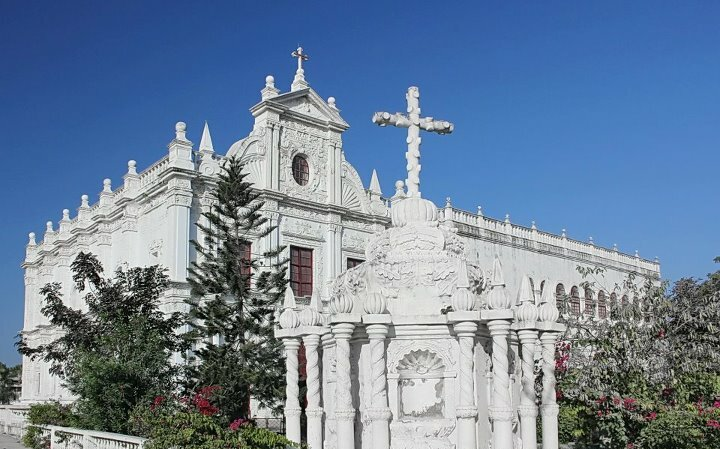
St Paul's Church, Diu

Christianity is practiced by 0.5% of the population of the state of Gujarat in India. The French or Catalan Dominican missionary; Jordan de Catalani was the first European missionary to start conversions to the Latin Church in India. He arrived at Surat in 1320 before proceeding onto the Konkan region for his mission. The Portuguese in Goa and Bombay controlled the areas of Damaon territory for more than four centuries; they brought more Catholic Christianity with them, into the neighbouring Guzerat Subah of the Moghal Empire.

Christians in Gujarat
Year	Number	Percentage
2001	284,092	0.56
2011	316,178	0.52

== History ==
The Charter Act 1813 passed by the British parliament curtailed the power of the East India Company and allowed entry of christian missionaries to areas controlled by the company. Notable early Missionaries included John Taylor M. D. (d. 1821), Joseph Taylor (d. 1852), his son J. V. S. Taylor (d. 1881) the translator of the Gujarati Bible "Old Version" (1861, rev. 1899), and his grandson George Pritchard Taylor (b. 1854) author of a Gujarati grammar. Missionaries established schools in the first half of the 20th century. Gujarati Christian and Khristie Bandhu are Gujarati Protestant monthlies published from Ahmedabad, with Khristie Bandhu being an older publication than Gujarati Christian. Doot is Gujarati Catholic monthly published from Anand, Gujarat since January 1911.

== Denominations ==
=== Roman Catholicism ===
The Catholic church in the state is governed from three ecclesiastical districts. These are the Roman Catholic Diocese of Ahmedabad, the Roman Catholic Archdiocese of Gandhinagar, the Roman Catholic Diocese of Baroda, and the Syro-Malabar Catholic Diocese of Rajkot

=== Protestant churches ===
The Protestant Church of North India has jurisdiction over Diocese of Gujarat. The Methodist Church in India, one of the largest Protestant Christian denominations, also has a Diocese of Gujarat.Assemblies of God in India, India Pentecostal Church of God, The Salvation Army and The Christian and Missionary Alliance Church churches too can be found in the state.

=== Malankara Orthodox Syrian Church ===
The Malakara Syrian Church in the state is governed by Orthodox Diocese of Ahmedabad.

=== Other denominations ===
Apart from this many free or independent churches are prominent in the state including many designated as Bible Churches. Although small in number they are very strong in their ideas adhering to The Holy Bible. Gandhinagar, the capital city of the state of Gujarat, is a home to Green City Bible Church, stationed on the prominent Sarkhej - Gandhinagar Highway.

The state has anti-conversion legislation.
