= Karighatta Hill =

Karighatta Karigiri, Karrighatta
- Hill
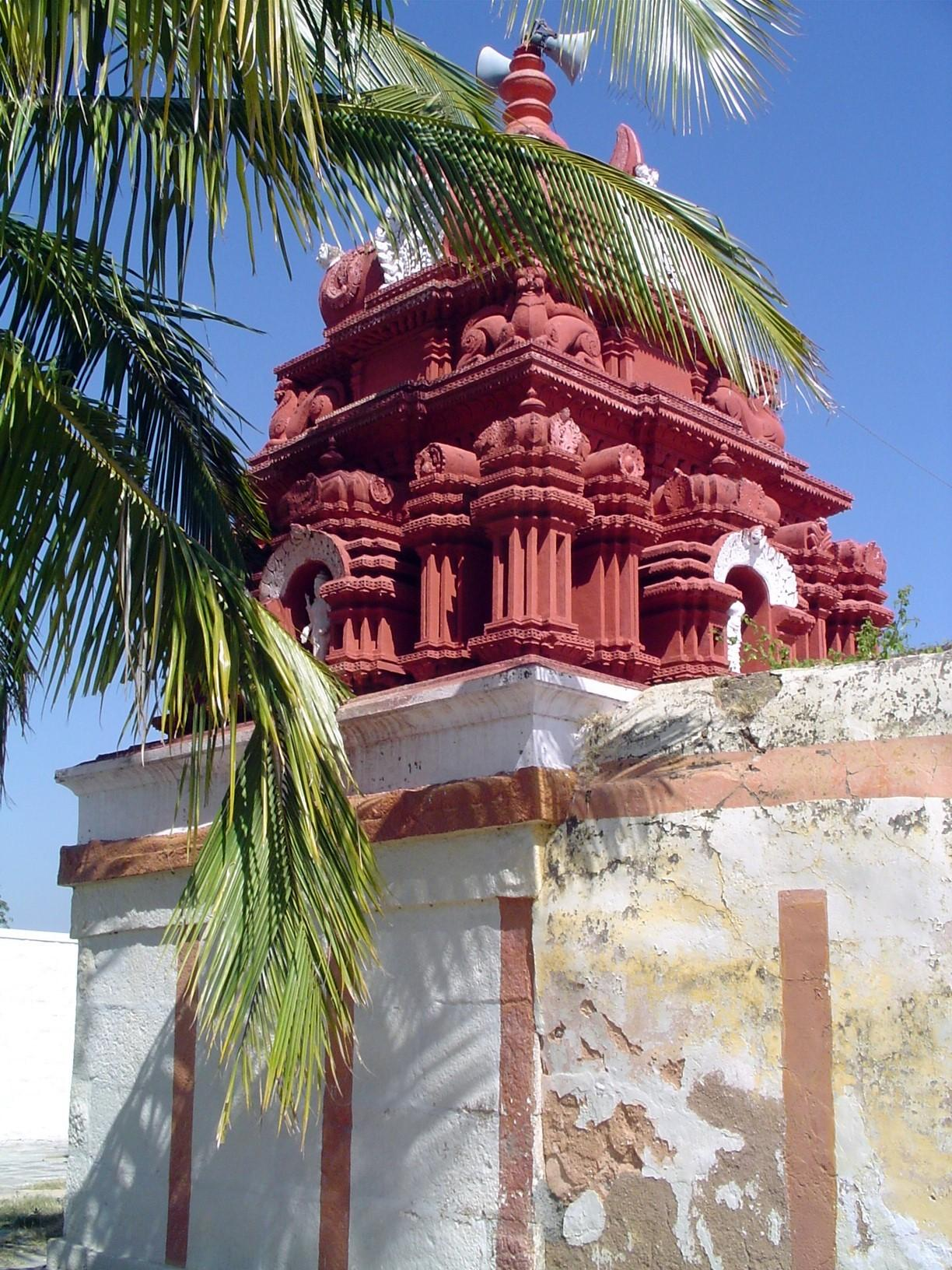
- The temple at the top of the hill

- Location in Karnataka, India
- Coordinates: 12°25′31″N 76°43′13″E
- Country: India
- State: Karnataka
- District: Mandya
- Nearest city: Mysore

Karighatta Hill is a hillock located in Srirangapatna taluk, Mandya district in Karnataka, India. It is 2,697 feet above sea level. At the top of the hill is Karighatta Temple, a temple dedicated to Srinivasa. The summit can be reached by climbing 450 steps or by the Srirangapatna–Bannur Road via auto rickshaws.

The name Karighatta derives from a historic tradition in which devotees would set fire to plants and trees at the top of the hill during Brahmotsava, a practice which was not endorsed by the temple. Since 2012, community volunteers with the support of the Forest Department have stopped the practice and have sought to reverse the environmental damage by planting saplings.

== See also ==
- Karighatta Road
- Nimishamba temple
- Polali Rajarajeshwari Temple
