= Joseph Taylor (missionary) =

Joseph Taylor (died 19 November 1859, Bombay), was a London Missionary Society missionary in Gujarat.

Joseph Taylor may have been the son of the first LMS missionary in Gujarat, John Taylor M.D., later surgeon in Bombay. He was father of J. V. S. Taylor of the Irish Presbyterian Mission, translator of the Bible into Gujarati, and grandfather of George Pritchard Taylor the grammarian of Gujarati language.

He was based in Bellary where a station had been founded by John Hands from 1812 together with Hands and William Reeve, then Belgaum from September 1820 till his retirement to Bombay in 1852, where he lived until his death in 1859.
