= Joseph Tayler =

Joseph Tayler may refer to:

- Joseph Needham Tayler (1783–1864), Vice-Admiral of the British Royal Navy
- Joseph Henry Tayler (1859–1959), American banker and Republican politician

== See also ==
- Joseph Taylor, several people
