= Edson Cemetery =

Cemetery in Middlesex County, Massachusetts

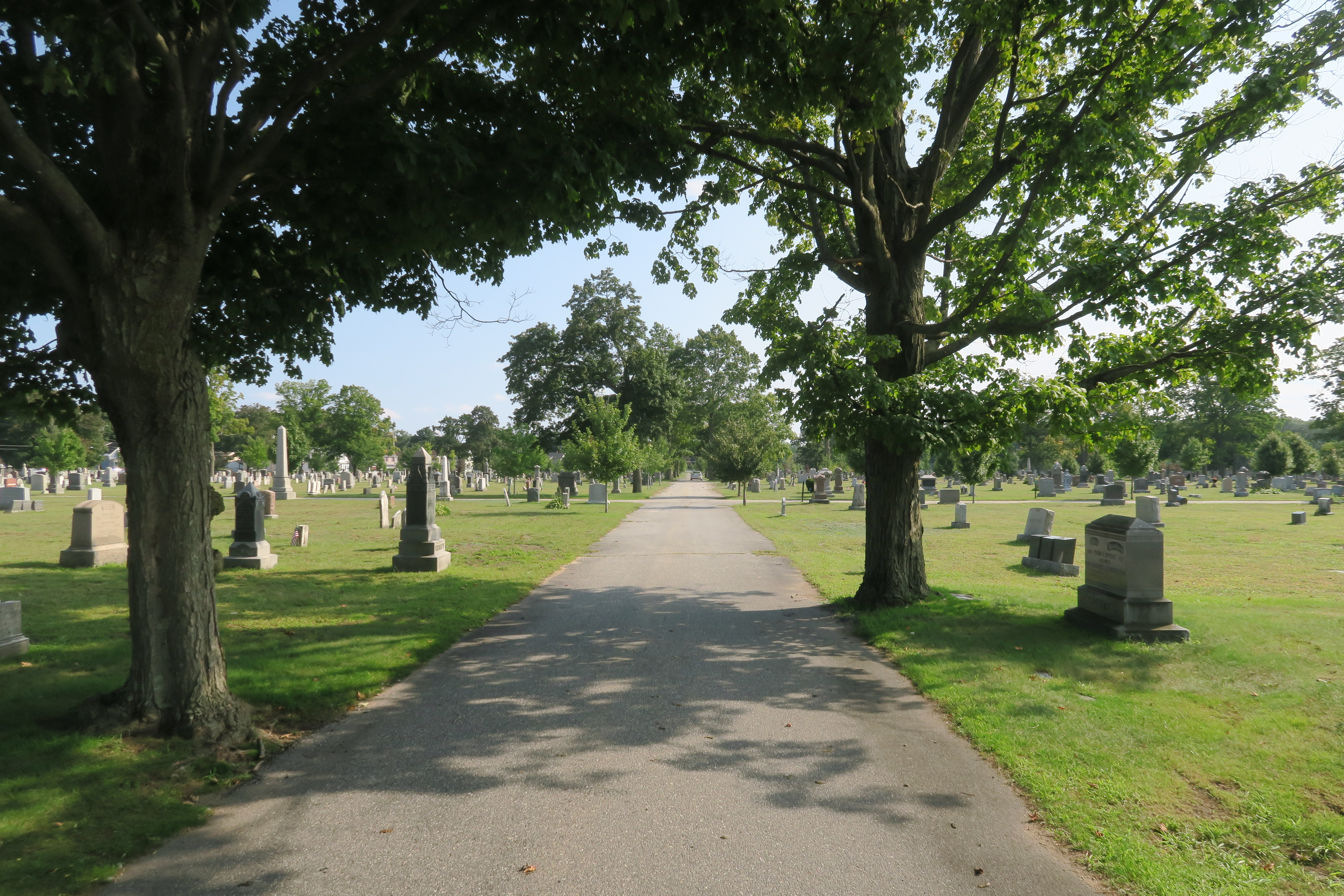
- Interactive map of Edson Cemetery

Details
- Established: 1846
- Location: Lowell, Massachusetts
- Country: United States
- Coordinates: 42°36′59″N 71°18′27″W
- Website: City of Lowell – Cemeteries
- Find a Grave: Edson Cemetery

The Edson Cemetery is a cemetery located in Lowell, Massachusetts, at 1375 Gorham Street.

== Overview ==
Edson Cemetery was opened as a public burial ground by the city of Lowell in 1846. It was named in honor of Rev. Theodore Edson, who was minister of the St. Anne's Church on Merrimack Street. It has over 10,000 lot owners, and is the largest of Lowell's cemeteries.

The grave of American author Jack Kerouac, at the center of section 94, is a frequent stop for tourists and readers who often leave mementos like candles, pens, cigarettes, and their own poetry.

== Notable burials ==
- Jack Kerouac, novelist
- John C. McFarland, Medal of Honor recipient, Civil War
- William Preston Phelps, painter
- Joseph Taylor, Medal of Honor recipient, Civil War
