= J. V. S. Taylor =

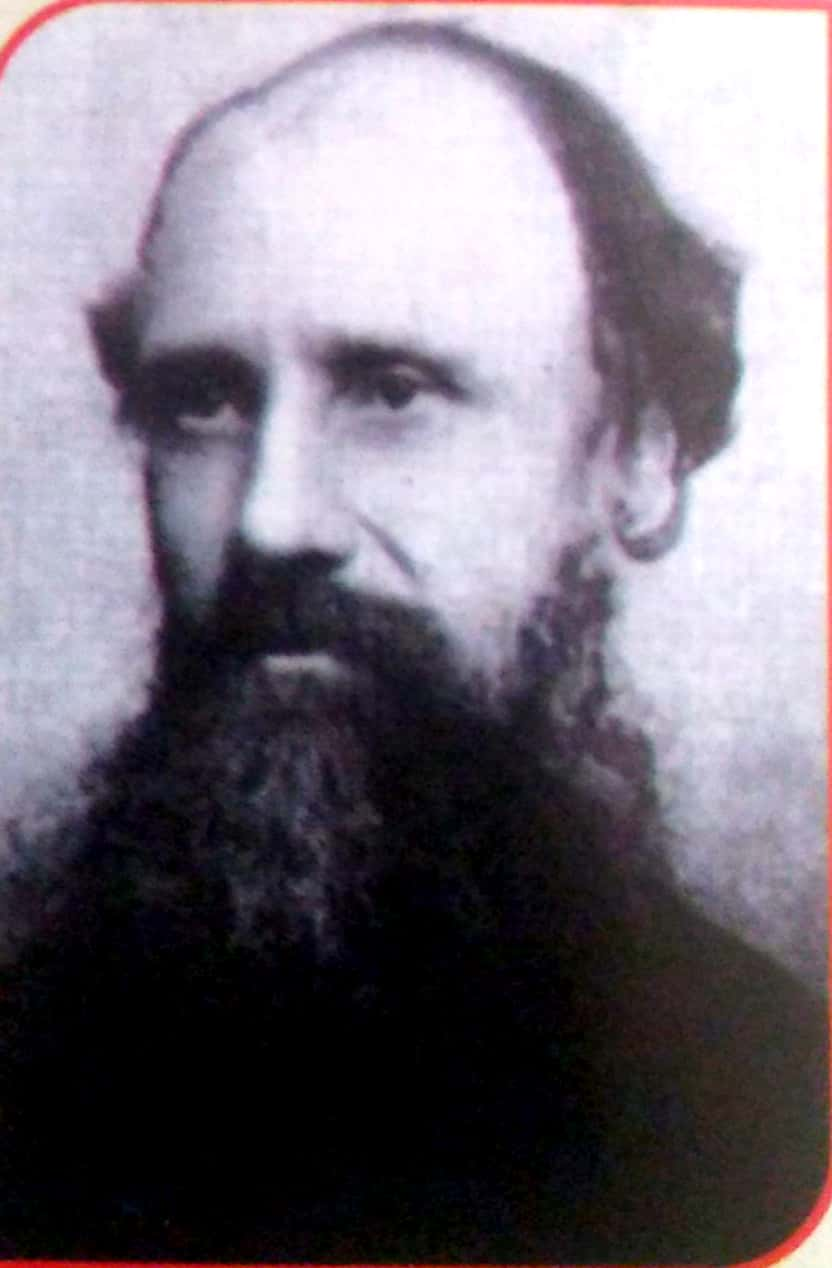
Photo of Rev. J. V. S. Taylor (Irish Presbyterian Missionary in Gujarat) from "Mati na Patr ma Daivi Khajano" written by Rev. Manasseh Bhurajibhai

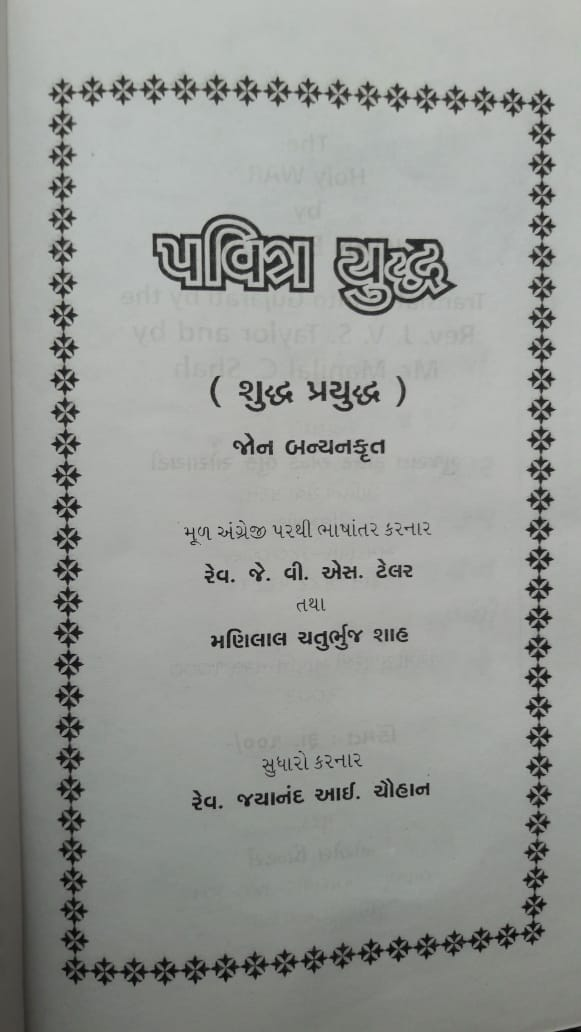
First Page of John Bunyan written "The Holy War" Gujarati Translation by Rev. J. V. S. Taylor & Mr. Manilal C. Shah.

Rev. Joseph van Someran Taylor (Bellary, 3 July 1820 – Edinburgh, 2 June 1881), known more commonly as J. V. S. Taylor, was a Scottish Christian missionary and writer of Gujarati language. He made the earliest attempt among westerners at writing a grammar of Gujarati, and also translated the Bible into Gujarati.

== Family ==
The earlier first London Missionary Society missionary to Gujarat, John Taylor M.D. had arrived in 1805 but became disheartened by the state of the mission and entered government service.

Joseph Taylor (d. Bombay, November 1852 or 1859), was missionary in Bellary since 1812, then Belgaum since September, 1820. It was this Joseph Taylor who was father of J. V. S. Taylor. Rev. J. V. S. Taylor was married twice, to Eliza Mary Pritchard (1847) and Georgina Brodie (1859): both his wives were Scottish. A son, Dr Lechmere Taylor, became Director of the Edinburgh Medical Missionary Society.

== Life ==
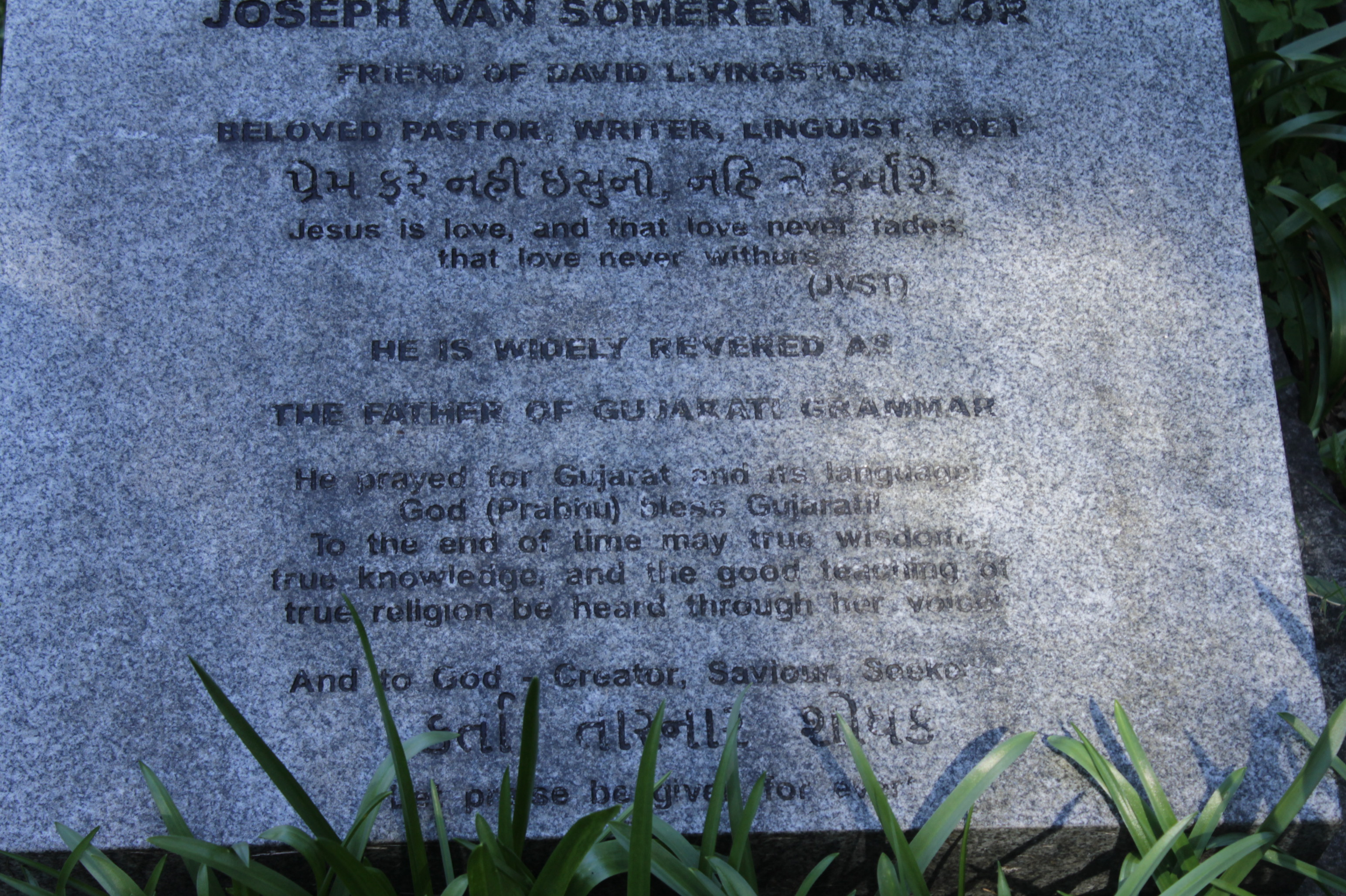
The grave of J V S Taylor, Newington Cemetery

J. V. S. Taylor was born on 3 July 1820, Bellary or Belgaon, Mysore. He studied at Bishop’s College, Calcutta until the age of 15, then he went to England in 1838 for further studies, where he developed a close relationship with the young David Livingstone (the friendship continued until Livingstone's death in Africa in 1873). In 1840, he attended Glasgow University and in 1843 he completed his B.A. The same year the London Missionary Society accepted him as missionary and sent him to India to be based in Madras.

Taylor arrived in Baroda, Gujarat, in 1846 and went with William Clarkson to Mahi Kantha. He soon learnt the local language. His articles first appeared in a missionary periodical in 1850. After Clarkson retired in 1854, the mission was transferred to the Irish Presbyterian Mission in 1858 where he continued his work in Gujarat due to his interest in the Gujarati language and people. He was founder of Church of North India (CNI) churches in Gujarat like Borsad and Shahwadi (Ranipur).

He died in Edinburgh on 2 June 1881 and was buried at Newington Cemetery, Edinburgh. His son, Dr. George Pritchard Taylor remained in India and became the first principal of Stevenson Divinity College, Ahmedabad, named after William Fleming Stevenson (1832–1886). G. P. Taylor also revised his father's first complete Gujarati grammar (1867), as well as publishing his own.

== Works ==
He published Gujarati Bhashanu Vyakaran (The Grammar of Gujarati Language) in 1867 which earned him the title of "Father of Gujarati Grammar". Though not the first, it was the earliest attempt to write Gujarati grammar in Gujarati to be used by natives. (Note: The attempts to write grammar before him include Illustration of the Grammatical Parts of Guzarattee, Mahratta, and English Languages (1808) by Robert Drummond (The earliest printed book in Gujarati discovered so far), A Grammar of Goozrattee Language, with Exercises, Dialogues and Stories (1829) by W. Forbes, The Principles of Gujarati Grammar (1842) by H. N. Ramsay, A Grammar of the Gujarati Language (1847) by W. A. Clarkson, Principle of Goojaratee Grammar (1857) by E. Lucky. These all works presented grammar of Gujarati language in English. They were meant for foreigners to study local language for administration and missionary work. Theodore Hope had published Gujarati Bhashanu Vyakaran (1858) which was in Gujarati but not exhaustive.) His work was more comprehensive and exhaustive. It was used in schools of the Bombay Presidency and went through many editions up to 1903. This was later superseded by the native-written Gujarati Bhashanu Brihad Vyakaran (1919) of Kamlashankar Trivedi.

He also compiled, with Vrajlal Shastri, Dhatusangraha (1870), an etymological dictionary of Gujarati roots. He had studied Gujarati prosody and his hymn collections Dharmagita (1851) and Kavyarpan (1863) are still popular in local churches. He is considered the father of Gujarati Christian poetry and his Bhajansangraha had 90 original and 18 translated songs. It includes some popular songs like Pita Tane Parakrame [પિતા તણે પરાક્રમે] (With the wish and might of my heavenly Father, hymn number 287), Maro Paalak Dev Chhe [મારો પાળક દેવ છે] (The Lord is my Shepherd, hymn number 18). He translated and published some works such as Christian Gottlob Barth's Church History in 1862, the Westminster Shorter Catechism as "લઘુ પ્રશ્નોતરાવળી" in 1878 and posthumously published the Westminster Confession of Faith as "Westminster Vishwasnamu" in 1888. He also translated John Bunyan's book "The Holy War" in Gujarati as "શુદ્ધ પ્રયુદ્ધ" with Mr. Manilal C. Shah which was also revised by Rev. J. I. Chauhan and published again as "પવિત્ર યુદ્ધ".

=== The Gujarati "Old Version" Bible ===
A Gujarati translation of the Bible had been issued by the Serampore Mission Press in 1820, and William Carey had contributed to it. James Skinner and William Fyvie of the London Missionary Society continued the work. These were all superseded by J. V. S. Taylor's 1861 "Old Version" which remains the standard version today.
