= George Pritchard Taylor =

George Pritchard Taylor (born Cambay, 1854; date of death unknown) was an Indian-born grammarian and numismatist of Northern Irish family origin.

He was son of J. V. S. Taylor, translator of the Bible into Gujarati, grandson of Joseph Taylor (missionary) of Belgaum, and probably great-grandson of John Taylor, M.D., assistant surgeon in Bombay.

George P. Taylor was ordained at Belfast in September 1877. Then at Surat 1878. For 28 years he was principal of the Stevenson Divinity College, named after William Fleming Stevenson (1832–1886), Ahmadabad.

Taylor participated at the observing expedition of K D Naegamvala for the total solar eclipse of 1898 January 22.

He revised and expanded the grammar of his father J. V. S. Taylor. His main numismatic work was The Coins of Tipu Sultan, Calcutta, 1914 (reprint, New Delhi, 1989).
