= Bible translations into Kannada =

The first attempt to translate Bible into Kannada was by the Serampore missionaries and they appear to have it completed by 1809. However this manuscript was lost in the 1812 fire at the Serampore press.

Some parts of the Bible were translated into Kannada in 1812. In 1823 The New Testament was published. In 1831 the complete Bible was published in Kannada. Translators included John Hands, founder of the London Missionary Society station in Bellary in 1810, and William Reeve at Bellary and Bangalore.

A revised version of the New Testament was published in 1850, and a further revised version was released in 1854. The LMS missionaries continued the work and the complete Bible was published by the year 1865. The revision of this Bible was handled by a committee and was released by 1934. This is the version still being used .

In collaboration with Church centric bible translation, Free Bibles India has published a Kannada translation online.

In 2009, the New Testament of New World Translation of the Holy Scriptures was released by Jehovah's Witnesses in Kannada. It was published online (also offline in PDF format) with mobile versions released through JW Library application in App stores.
