= Wellesley Bridge, Srirangapatna =

Wellesley Bridge, Srirangapatna Kiraguru Sethuve
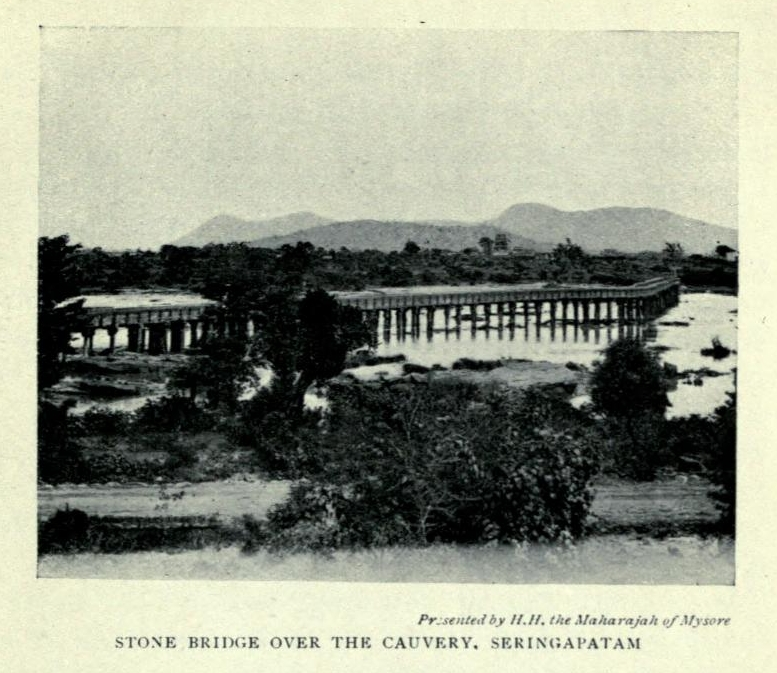
- Wellesley Bridge
- Carries: Mysore-Srirgapatna-Bengaluru Road
- Crosses: Kaveri River
- Locale: Srirangapatna
- Other name: Purnaiah Bridge
- Named for: Richard Wellesley, Governor General of India
- Owner: Archaeology Department of Karnataka
- Heritage status: Heritage bridge

Characteristics
- Material: Entirely of stone
- Total length: 512 feet (156 m)
- Width: 20 feet (6.1 m)
- Longest span: 8 feet (2.4 m) each span
- No. of spans: 64
- Clearance below: 22 feet (6.7 m)
- Design life: More than 200 years

History
- Constructed by: Dewan Purnaiah of Mysore Kingdom
- Construction start: 1802
- Construction end: 1804
- Construction cost: Rs 5.5 lakhs
- Opened: Now open to cycles, motorcycles and pedestrians only
- Inaugurated: 4 October 1804
- Rebuilt: Renovated in 2022

Wellesley Bridge, Srirangapatna is an ancient stone bridge built in 1804 on the Highway road leading to Bengaluru from Mysuru in the state of Karnataka. This stone bridge is built across the north bank of the Cauvery River (also spelled Kaveri River). When built it was the main first artery approach to the island town of Srirangapatna (also known as Seringapatam during British Raj) which was initially the capital city of the Wodeyar Dynasty of Mysore Kingdom after the death of Tipu Sultan in 1799. The bridge was dedicated to Marquis Wellesley who was the Governor-General of British India when it was completed, and it was inaugurated in October 1804. It was built under the overall supervision of Dewan, Purnaiah of the Kingdom of Mysore, as directed by the King Mummadi Krishnaraja Wodeyar.

The strong bridge is built from stone pillars and corbels, surrounded by stone girders, and survived over 200 years of heavy traffic and heavy floods in the river. It was repaired in 2018-22 and put to use by cyclists, motor cyclists, and pedestrians. It has been proposed to promote the bridge to a heritage monument.

== History ==
After this war, the Kingdom of Mysore was restored to the Wodeyar Dynasty by the British Raj with the King Mummadi Krishnaraja Wodeyar as the ruler. The then Dewan - Regent, Purnaiah of the Mysore Kingdom, was directed by the King (who was still a minor) to embark on planning and building a strong bridge across the Cauvery River on priority to open up an easy means of communication to Srirangapatna which was still the capital city of Wodeyar kingdom before it was shifted to Mysore city.

Purnaiah prepared an estimate of Rs 5.5 lakhs to build the bridge to connect to Kirigur and beyond to Mysore. The site for the bridge was selected by Arthur Wellesley, 1st Duke of Wellington, the governor of Seringapatam and Mysore, who had led the British regiment against Tipu Sultan in 1799. He was the brother of Richard Wellesley, the Governor-General after whom the bridge has been named. Purnaiah was awarded for his work on this bridge and he also received a pension.

A bilingual inscription (English and Persian) on this bridge records the naming of the bridge in honour of Marques Wellesley Bahadur referred to in the Persian text as Jisr-i-Wellesley.

== Features ==
The bridge built on the northern branch of the Kaveri River has a total of 64 spans of 8 ft each with 512 feet of linear waterway. In local Kannada language it is called as Kirangur Sethuve ('Sethuve' meaning "bridge") meaning the bridge that leads to Kirangur village. It has withstood heavy floods of the Kaveri River during the intense rains of the south-west monsoon. Following the construction of the KRS dam on the Kaveri river in upstream reaches, the bridge has withstood releases of more than 100000 cusecs of flood water.

The bridge, though rough in appearance, was built to native architectural design with monolithic stone pillars mounted with stone corbels (in two layers) that support four layers of stone girders which are topped by the stone slabs of the roadway. This bridge was the main source for the vehicular traffic between Bengaluru and Mysuru region till a new bridge was constructed in 1967, downstream.

The Heritage Committee of Mysore has urged the Government of Karnataka to declare the bridge as a heritage monument as it meets the criteria.

== Restoration ==
Over its two centuries of existence, the bridge had seen cracks, weeds and tree growth endangering its stability, and even a part of its abutment retaining wall had collapsed. Urged by the expert heritage committee, the repair and restoration works of the bridge including the piers were initiated by the Department of Archaeology, Museums and Heritage in 2018 at an estimated cost of Rs 28 lakh. Apart from the piers, the top slab at the base of the bridge has been replaced with new stones. The restoration works have since been completed in line with the original construction limestone, burnt bricks and small stones and made strong enough to withstand heavy flood discharge in the river.
