= John Hands =

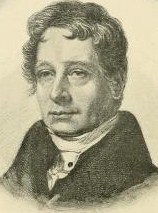
John Hands.

John Hands (5 December 1780 – 30 June 1864 in Dublin) was a missionary of the London Missionary Society in India and, with William Reeve, translator of one of the first Bible translations into Kannada (1820). Hands founded the mission station in Bellary in 1810, after having failed to establish a base at Seringapatam.
