= Joseph Taylor (cricketer) =

Australian cricketer

Personal information
- Born: 7 September 1886; Leichhardt, New South Wales, Australia
- Died: 3 September 1954 (aged 67); Newcastle, New South Wales, Australia
- Source: ESPNcricinfo, 3 February 2017

Joseph Taylor (7 September 1886 – 3 September 1954) was an Australian cricketer. He played two first-class matches for New South Wales between 1911/12 and 1913/14 and one first-class match for Wellington in 1927/28.

== See also ==
- List of New South Wales representative cricketers
