= William Reeve (missionary) =

See also William Reeve (bishop) (1844-1925), missionary to Canada

William Reeve (1794-1850) was a London Missionary Society missionary to India, author of an early dictionary of the Kannada language, and translator with John Hands of the Bible into Kannada. The dictionary was compiled from 1827 to 1834, when he was in Bangalore. His connection with the Society ceased 23 November 1835.

William Reeve was the first to compile the Canarese - English dictionary, which was published in 1858, by the Wesleyan Mission Press, financially supported by Sir. Mark Cubbon the British Resident of Mysore.

Reeve was minister of the Congregational church at Oswestry, from 1836 to 1843. He then suffered a complete loss of sight, and moved to Bristol. He died in 1850.
