= Ranipur, Bihar =

Ranipur is situated about 8 km from Benipatti in Bihar, India. The nearest railway station is Kamtaul which is about 12 km from Ranipur. The post office is Basaitha whose pin code is 847102. It is nearly 100 km from Nepal's Tarai region. The language spoken by people is Maithili.

It is a small village with population of 550. The non-veg food famous here is fish with mustard paste.

It comes under the Madhubani district.
