= Nimishamba =

Temple in Karnataka, India

Nimishamba Temple
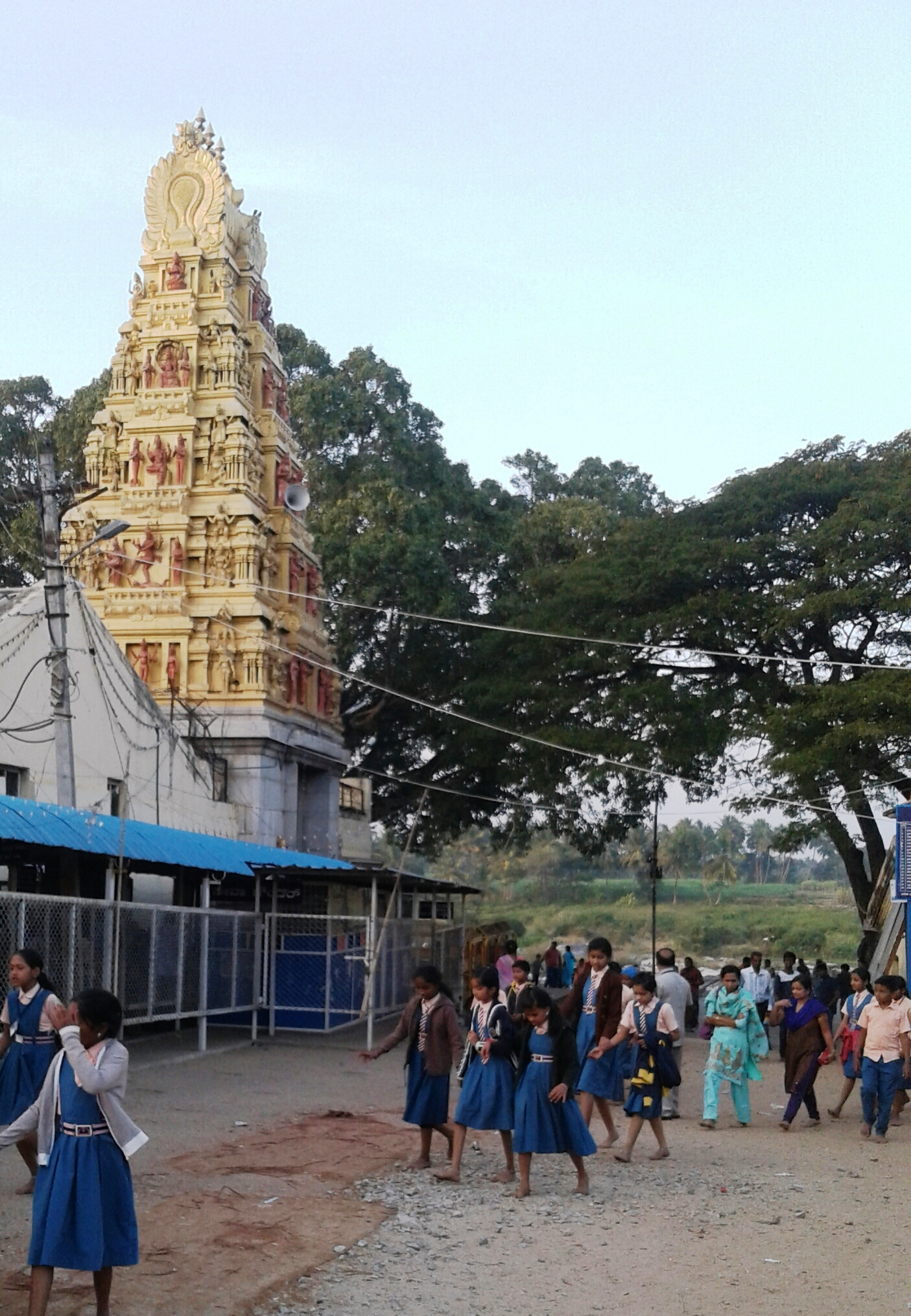
- Nimishamba Temple

Religion
- Affiliation: Hinduism
- Deity: Nimishamba
- Festival: Navratri, Varalakshmi Vratam

Location
- Location: Srirangapattana, Karnataka, India
- Interactive map of Nimishamba Temple
- Coordinates: 12°25′7.63″N 76°42′38.42″E

Nimishamba is the name of a Hindu female deity (Devi) enshrined in a temple on the banks of the Cauvery river, located about 2 km from Srirangapattana on the road leading to Sangam (confluence) in the south Indian state of Karnataka.

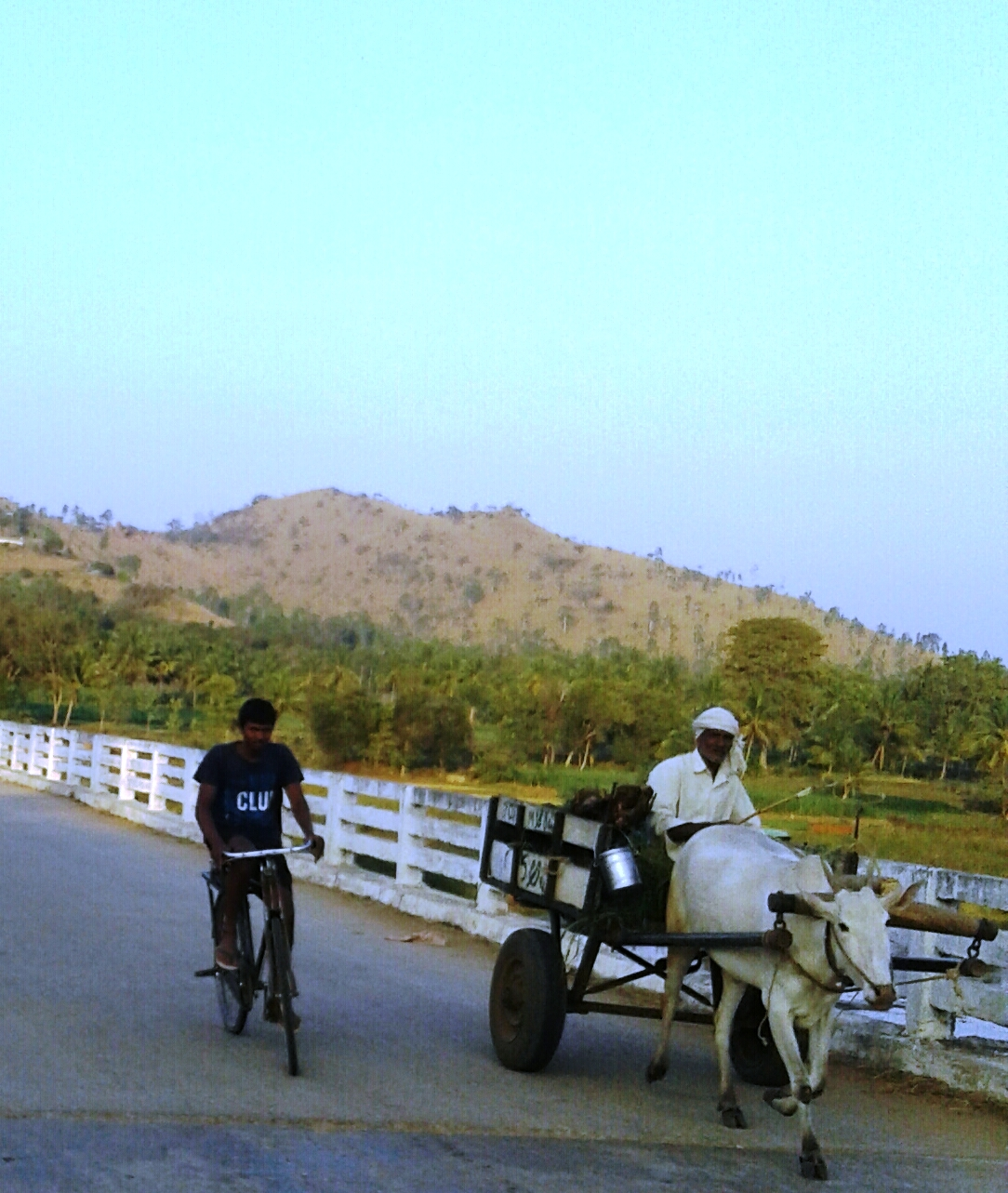
Nimishamba Bridge

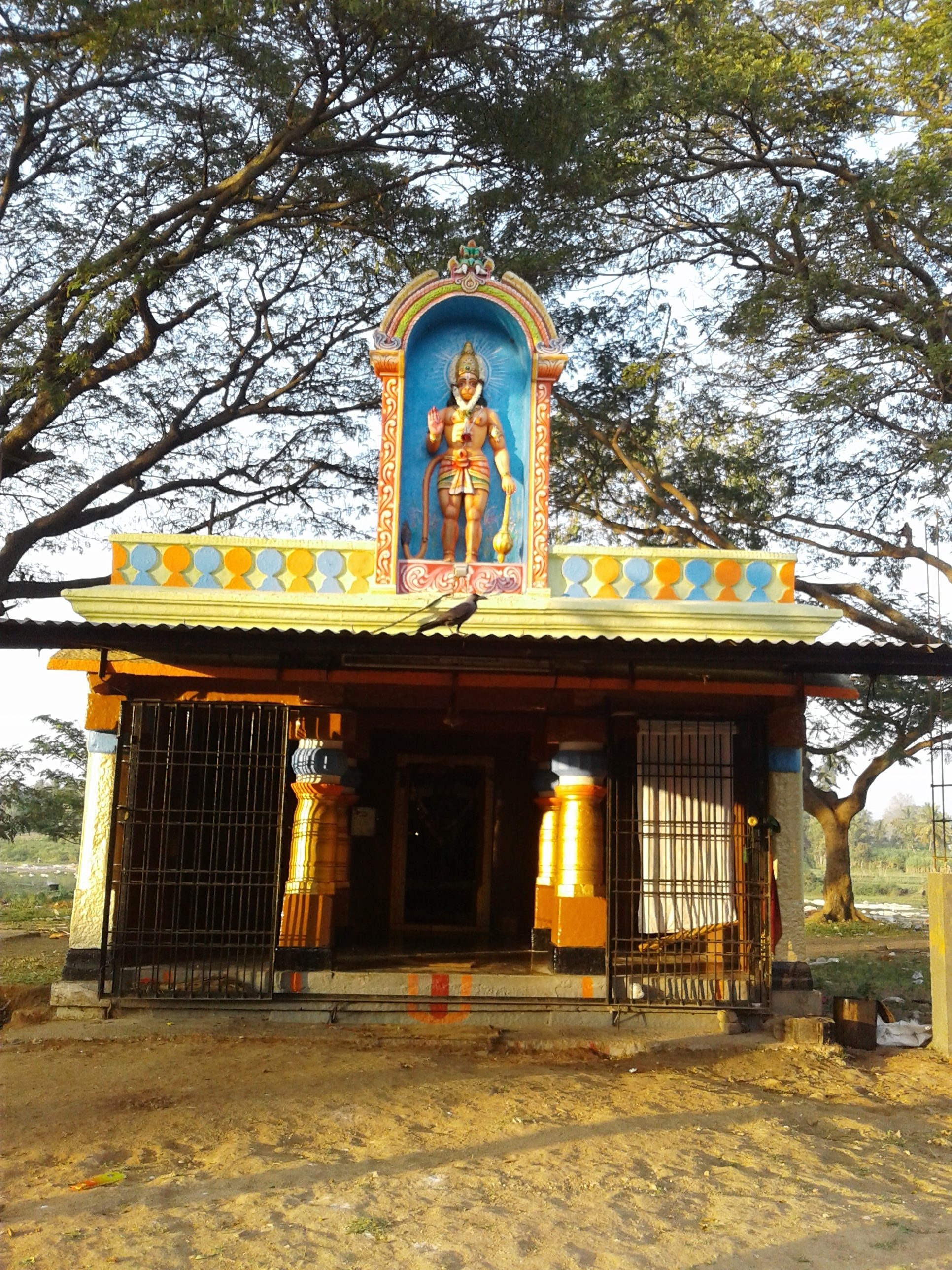
Second Temple

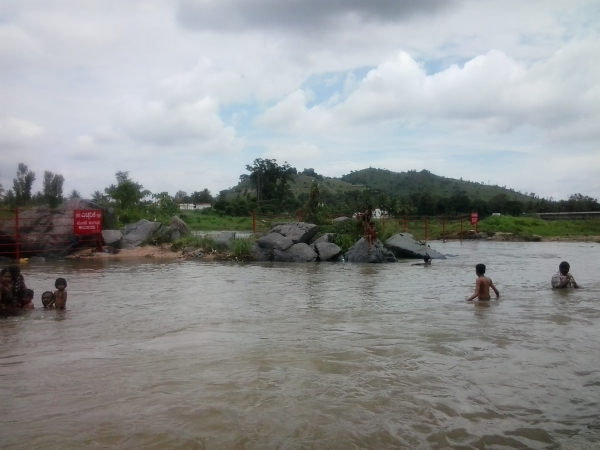
River Cauvery near Nimishamba Temple

In Chennai, Nimishamba temple is behind Broadway bus stand and resembles Nimishamba at Srirangapatna. It is considered very powerful and worries of devotees are removed in a minute as name suggests.

== History ==
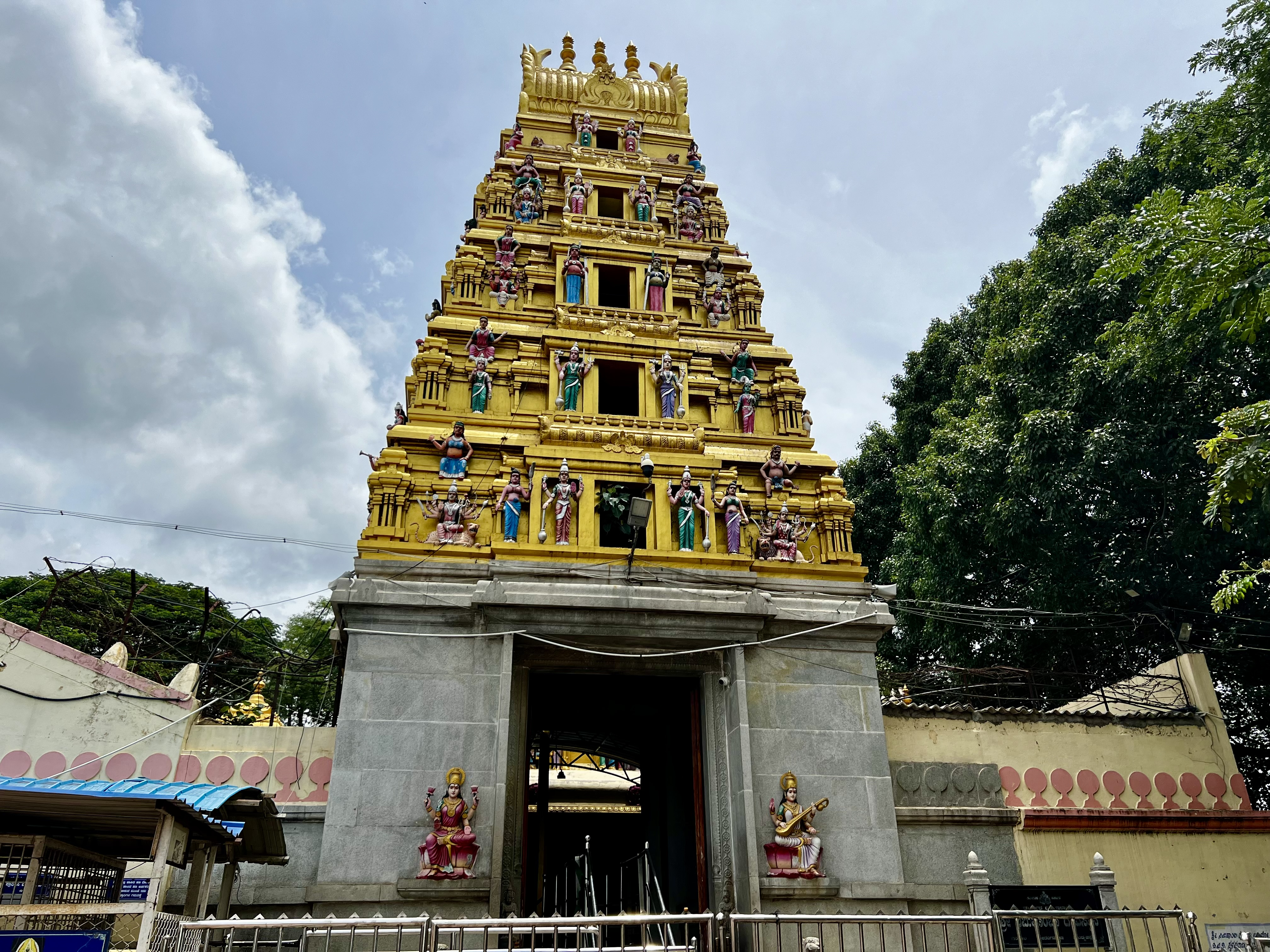
Front view

Goddess Nimishamba is considered as the incarnation of Goddess Parvathi, the consort of Lord Shiva. This place Ganjam is considered as a holy place. Muktharaja of Somavamsha Aryakshatriya performed penance at Nimishamba Temple.

Shrichakra is carved on a stone in front of Sri Nimishamba and pooja is performed. There is a belief that Goddess Nimishamba is going to remove all the problems and troubles of her devotees within a minute. That is why she is called Nimishamba. Nimisha means a minute and Amba is the name of Parvathi. Somavamsha Aryakshatriya clan sumanaska's son Mutharasa or king Muktharaja was blessed with the boon that Sri Nimishamba will come to his aid in his fight against janumandala's minister subaahu and ghatodhara the demons in a minute. That is why there is a deity Lord Shiva by the name of mukteshwar. This temple was installed at the time of Mummadi Krishnaraja Wodeyar about 300 to 400 years ago.

The temple of Nimishamba lies at a distance of two kilometers from Srirangapatna bus stand in the eastern direction beyond Tippu's summer palace on the road leading to Sangam. The temple is at a higher elevation on the bank of the Cauvery and faces east. The river flows by at a lower level, and steps have been neatly cut on stone slabs to reach it. It is a small shrine with a seven-tiered Rajagopuram. Goddess Nimishamba's sannidhi is to the right as one enters the shrine. It is a fine piece of an icon. She is beautifully bedecked with jewelry and garlands of red roses. In front of the Goddess is placed the Sri Chakra to which puja is done with kumkum by the priest. The devotees stand in rapt attention till deeparadhana is offered to the deity.

Adjoining the sannidhi of the Goddess is that of Siva, whose appellation is Aksheeswara. The icon is a small sized linga. The Nandi is proportionately small sized and is diagonally facing Siva. Only after offering 'deeparadhana' to Siva, it is offered to the Goddess. Adjoining this sannidhi is that of Lakshminarayana. All the three sannidhis are in a row. There are no suka nasi and Navaranga. There is only a mukha mantapa.

There is a big brass bell hanging from the ceiling, which is rung by the priest himself after placing the 'bali bhojanam' on the bali peetam for the crows to eat. Once the bell is rung, the crows come down to the bali peetam in an orderly way to partake it! It is indeed unique to this temple. There is a prakaram (closed precincts of a temple) for circumambulation. The Nimishamba temple has shot to fame recently for its instant granting of boons to those who pray here.

It would be of interest to note that marriage proposals which have been dragging on for years, get clicked immediately after visiting this shrine. It is probable that the temple might have been built during the reign of Raja Wadiyar I (1610–38 A.D.) who ascended the Mysore throne at Srirangapatna. Regular puja has been done for the last 50 years. The temple falls under the HR&CE of Karnataka State. One of the temples is also located at OTC Road Cottonpet (Near Majestic), Bangalore. Another temple is located near Raja Rajeshwari Nagar, Bangalore.

== Ceremonies ==
There is a festival on "Nimishamba jayanthi" by Sri Somavamsha Arya Kshtriyas, which is celebrated on Vaishaka Shuddha Dasami of every year, The festival is also celebrated as "Vasavamba jayanthi" by arya vsyas. On every full moon day there are special poojas. Every day from 6am to 8:30pm, one can have the "darshan" of goddess. There will be 'Homa' celebrations like Durga Homa, Chandika Homa during Navaratri and special poojas are done to the Goddess on Vijayadashami day. Special Pooja is offered on major festival days like Shivaratri, Ugadi, and Deepavali. The temple serves free meals to all the devotees on every full moon day.

There is river "Cauvery" with shallow waters adjoining the temple. This river attracts a lot of travellers to Mysore from Bangalore who stop by for a refreshing bath and lunch by the riverside.

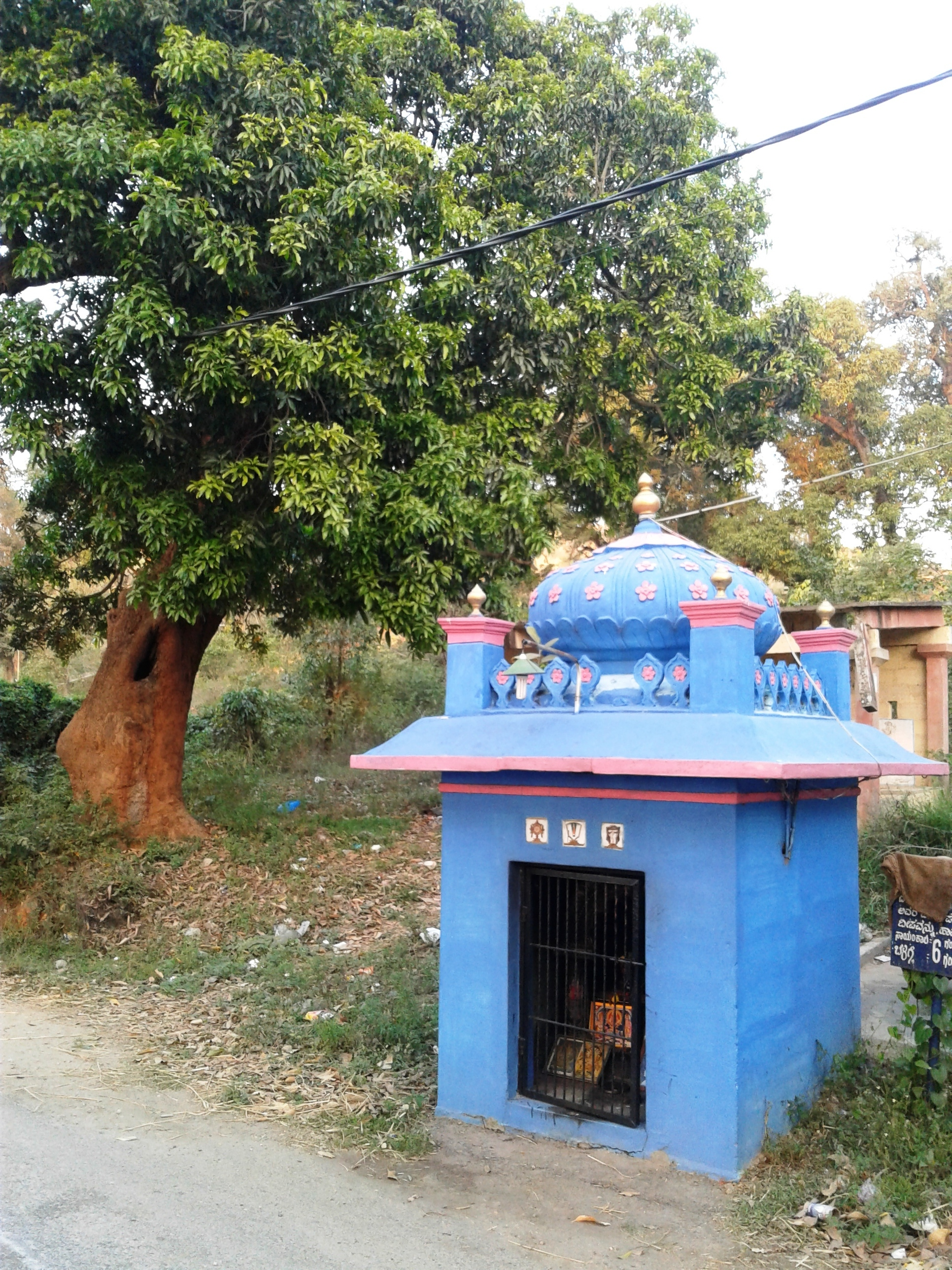
Karighatta junction

== Transportation ==
There is a bus service from the Mysore city to here. Commuters can also take an auto from Srirangapattana.

== Other Nimishamba Temples ==
*Sri nimishamba devi temple, Ganjam, near Sri ranga pattna Mysore.

- Sri Nimishamba Temple, OTC Road Cottonpet (Akkipet, Near Majestic) Bangalore, which was built by devotees and committee members of Shri Somavamsha Arya Kshatriya whose kuladevi is Shri Nimishamba Devi. The temple was built 2 decades ago in south Indian style, This temple has shrines of Nimishamba Devi, Lord Shiva, Vinayaka, Aiyyappa, Subramanya and Venkateshwara Padmavathi. Amavasya Homa is performed every month of Amavasya.
- Shri Nimishamba Sannidhi, Rajarajeshwari Nagar, Bangalore. This shrine is built in the traditional Parashurama Kshetra Architectural Style. This temple was built with the help of the devotees of Shri Nimishamba Devi. The Temple has shrines of Devi Nimishamba, Shiva, Siddhi Vinayaka, Saraswathi and Lakshmi Narayana. Chandika Homa is performed daily in a specially designed Yagna Shala. The temple has two meditation halls. The kitchen and dining hall have all the facilities required for Nitya Annadana.
- There is the Arulmigu Shi Nimishimabal Temple located in Chennai at No:36, Kasi Chetty Street, Chennai -6000079, Tamil Nadu, India: Landmark : Opposite Agarwal Bhavan. This temple is open between 8am and 11am and between 5.30 PM and 8PM. The Temple has shrines of Devi Nimishamba, Venkateswara, Siddhi Vinayaka, Shiva, Muruga, Anjaneya and the Nava Grahas.
- Shri Nimishamba Devi Temple is located at Shukravarapet Khammmam, Telangana State.
- Shri Nimishamba Devi Temple is located at " Opposite Shankar Mutt, Tank Mohalla, Shivamogga."
- Shri Nimishamba Devi Temple is located at Keerthi Nagar Colony, Warangal, Telangana State. (Sanjay: 9866135004; Prabhakar: 9966871501)
- Shri Nimishamba Devi temple is located at Nirmal, Adilabad, Telangana State.
- Shri nimishamba Devi temple is located at Balkonda, Nizamabad, Telangana State.
- Shri nimishamba Devi temple is located at Boduppal, Pentareddy Colony, Hyderabad. Telangana State, Cell : 9247755136.
- Shri nimishamba Devi Temple is located at Chittari street, Kurnool, Andhra Pradesh
- Shri nimishamba Devi Temple is located at Cheruvukatta, Ananthapuram, Andhra Pradesh
- Shri Nimishamba Devi Temple is located at Park road Nandyal.(Kurnool District) Andhra Pradesh.
- Shri Nimishamba Devi Temple is located at Bhagyanagar, Koppal Dist, Karnataka.
- Shri Nimishamba Devi Temple is located at KURADI road, NAGPUR.
- Shri Nimishamba Devi Temple is located at s.p.m.road, Shahapur, Belgaum.
- Shri Nimishamba Devi Temple is located at Mandoli road, Guruprasad Colony, Belgaum
- Shri Nimishamba Devi Temple is located at 4th main road, Jayanagar, Bangalore
- Shri Nimishamba Devi Temple is located at Chitradurga Chellakere Main road(around 2 km from main road, located on right side of the road) Chitradurga.Karnataka State.Which was built by devotees and Trust members of Shri Somavamsha Arya Kshatriya whose kuladevi is Shri Nimishamba Devi. The temple was built on 18 May 2012 in South Indian style.

In Chennai Nimishamba temple is behind Broadway bus stand.It resembles Nimishamba at Srirangapatna and as name suggests it is considered that worries of devotees are removed in a minute and it is very powerful and serene.

== See also ==
- Karighatta temple
- Srirangapatna
