= Joe Taylor (infielder) =

Professional baseball player

- Second baseman
- Born: 1913; Mississippi, U.S.
- Batted: Both Threw: Right

Negro league baseball debut
- 1937, for the St. Louis Stars

Last appearance
- 1937, for the St. Louis Stars

Teams
- St. Louis Stars (1937)

Joseph Taylor (1913 - death date unknown) was an American professional baseball second baseman in the Negro leagues. He played with the St. Louis Stars in 1937.
