= Srirangapatna =

Srirangapattana ಶ್ರೀರಂಗಪಟ್ಟಣ (Shreerangapattana) Seringapatam
- Town
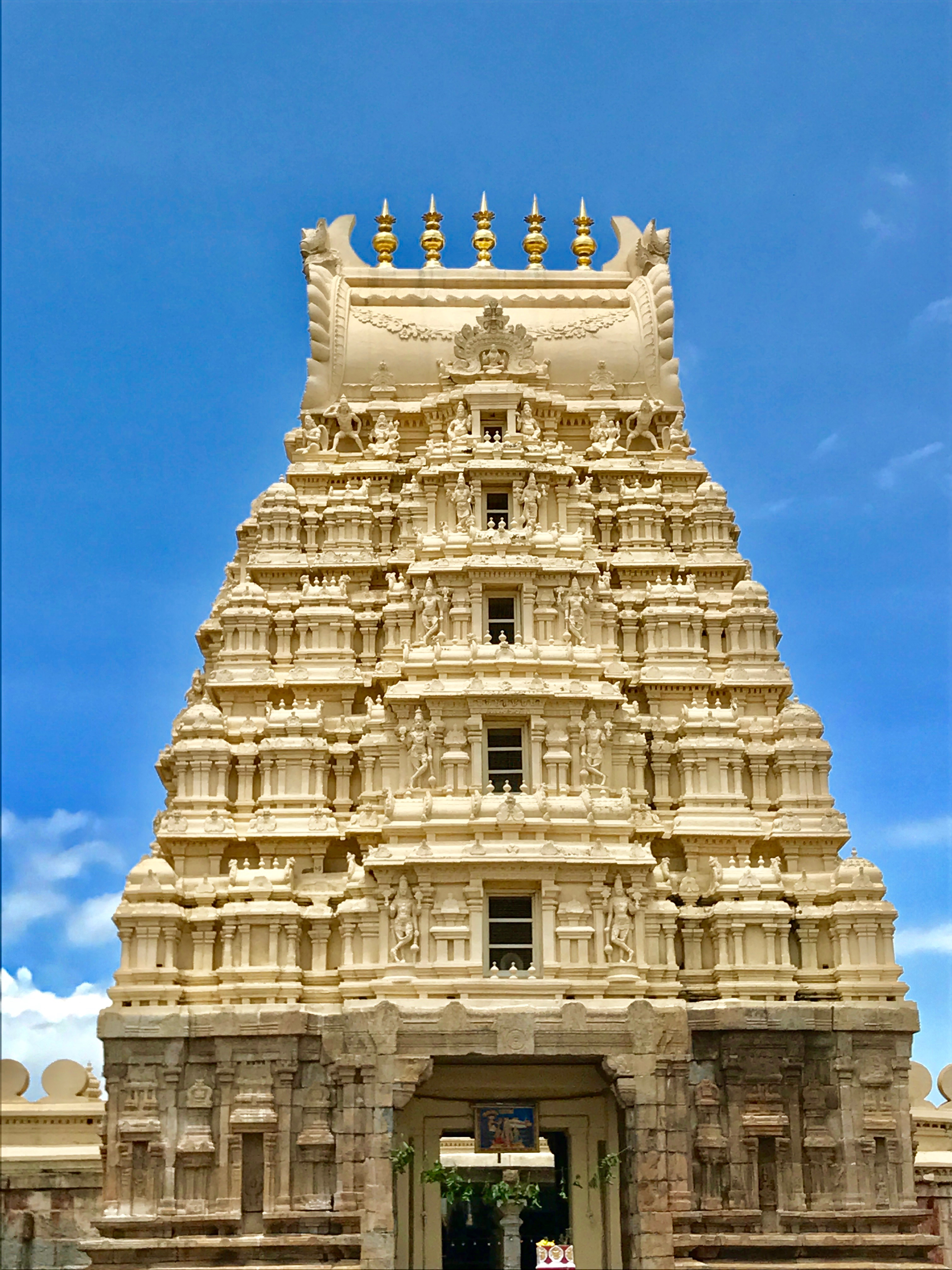
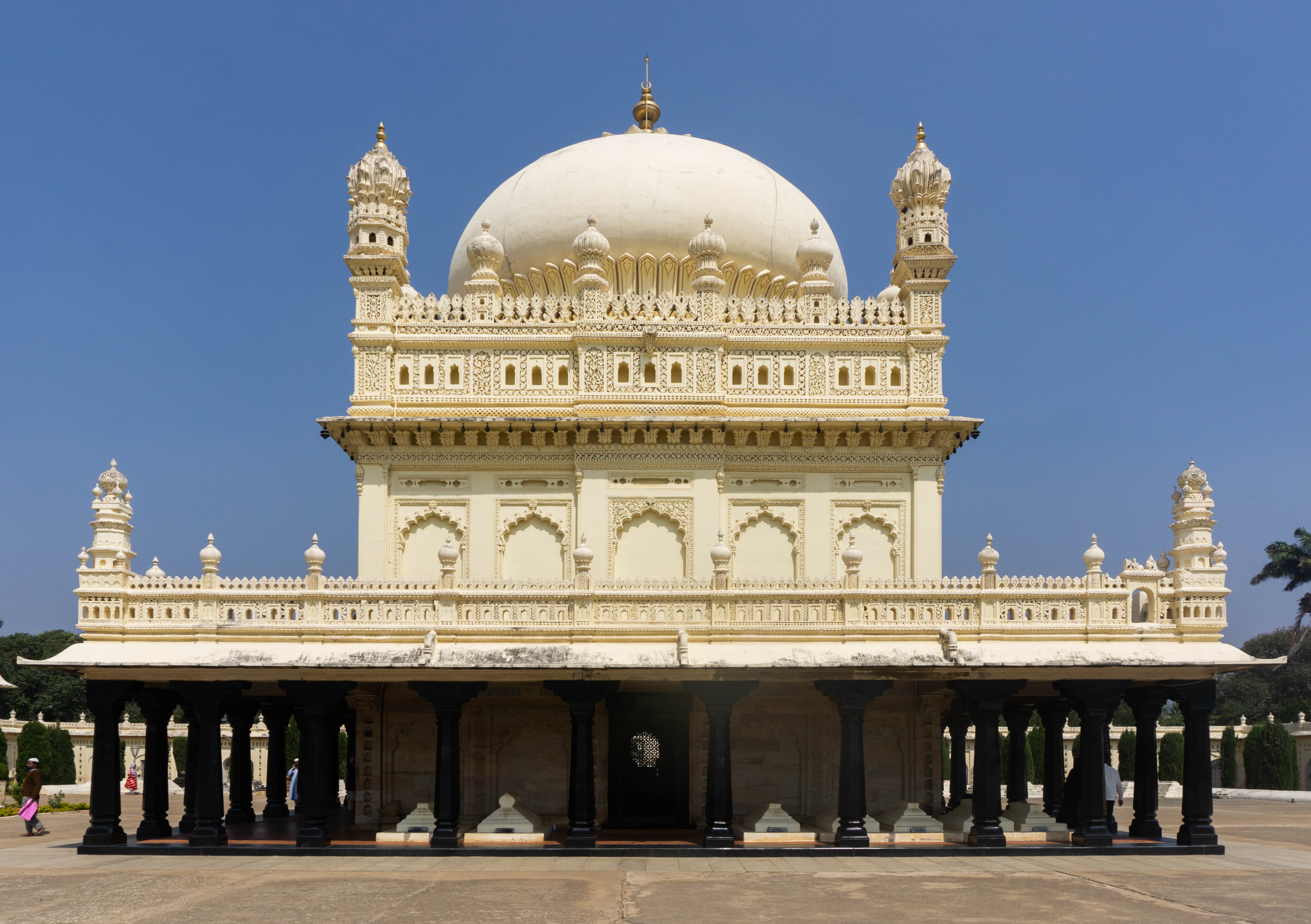
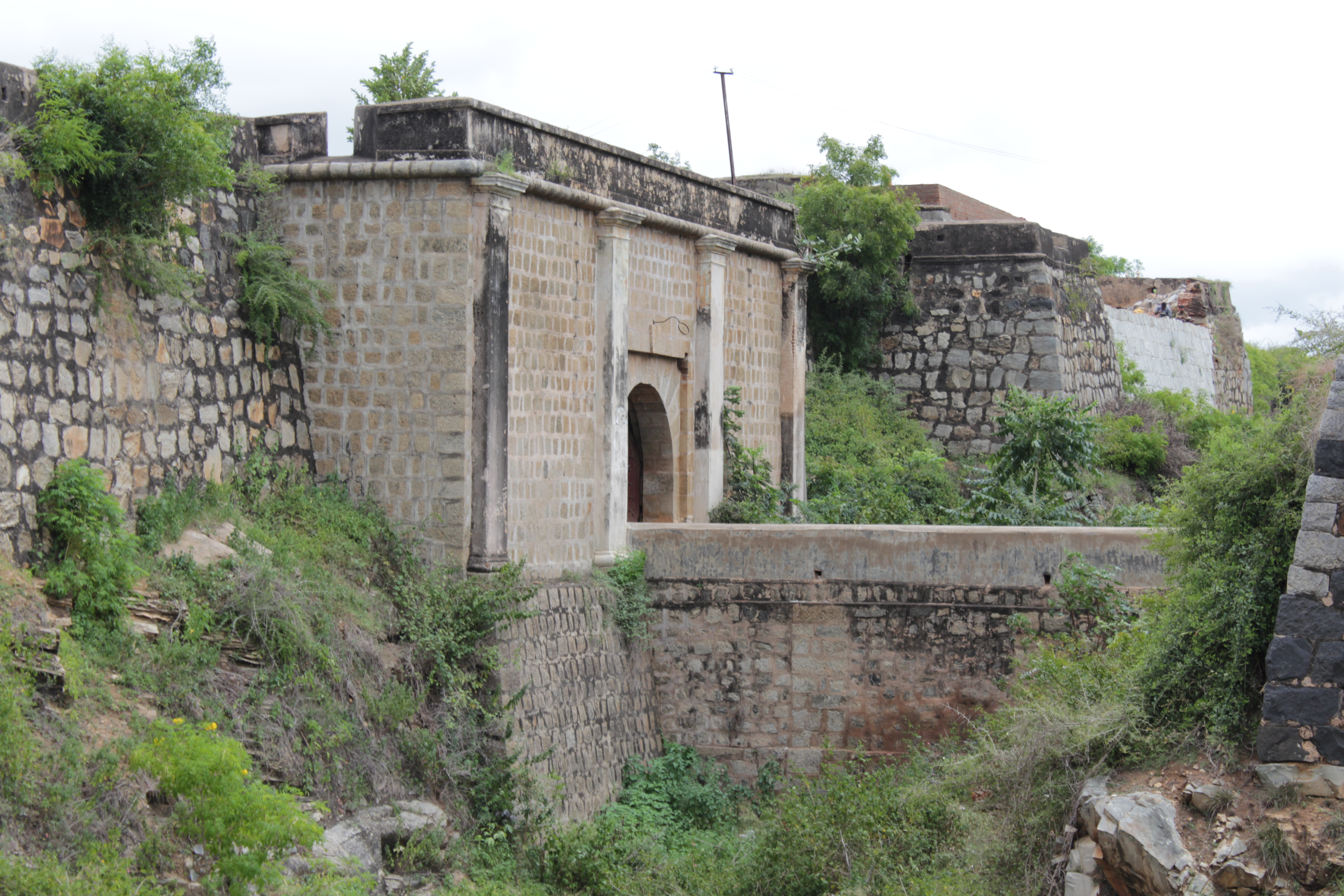
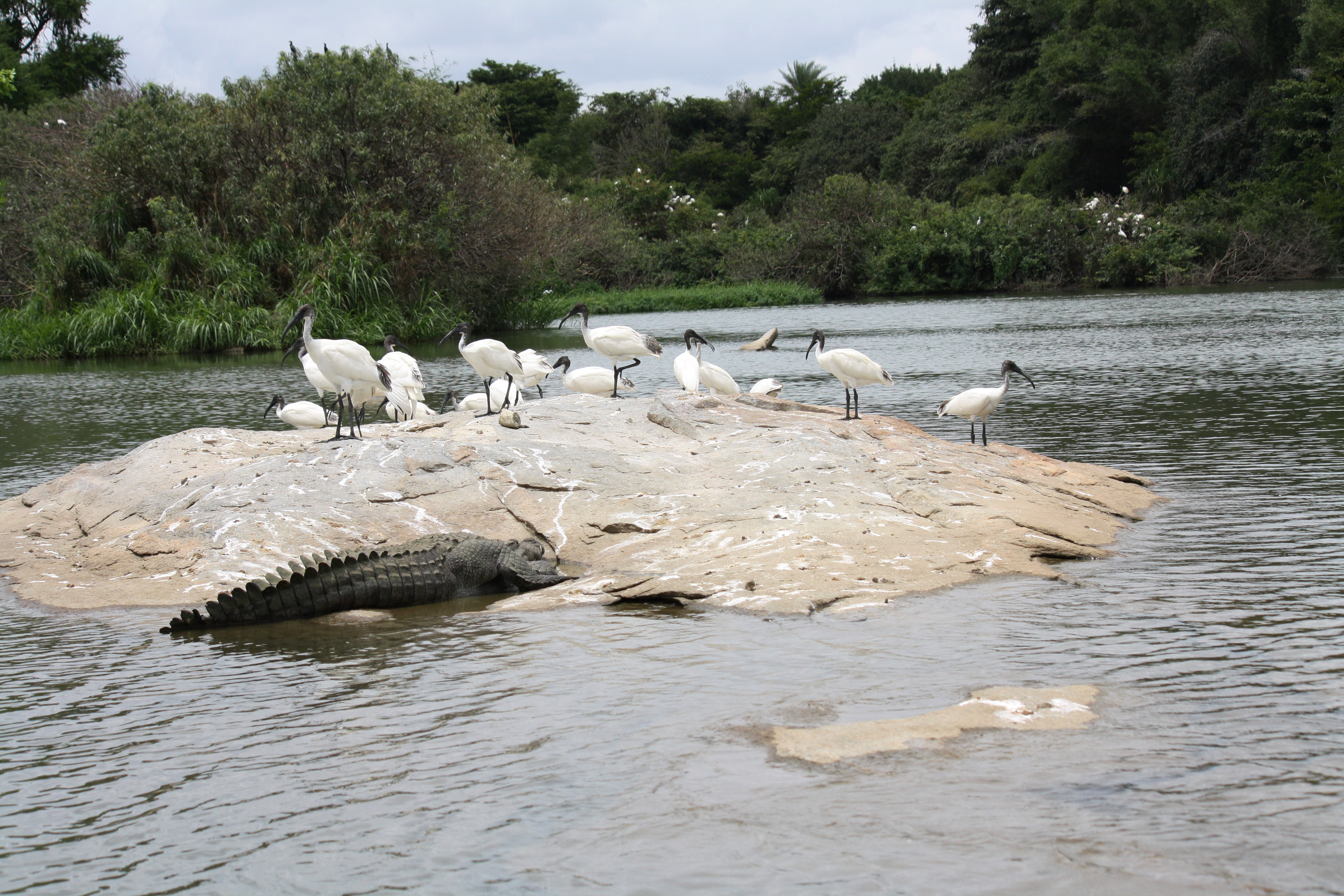
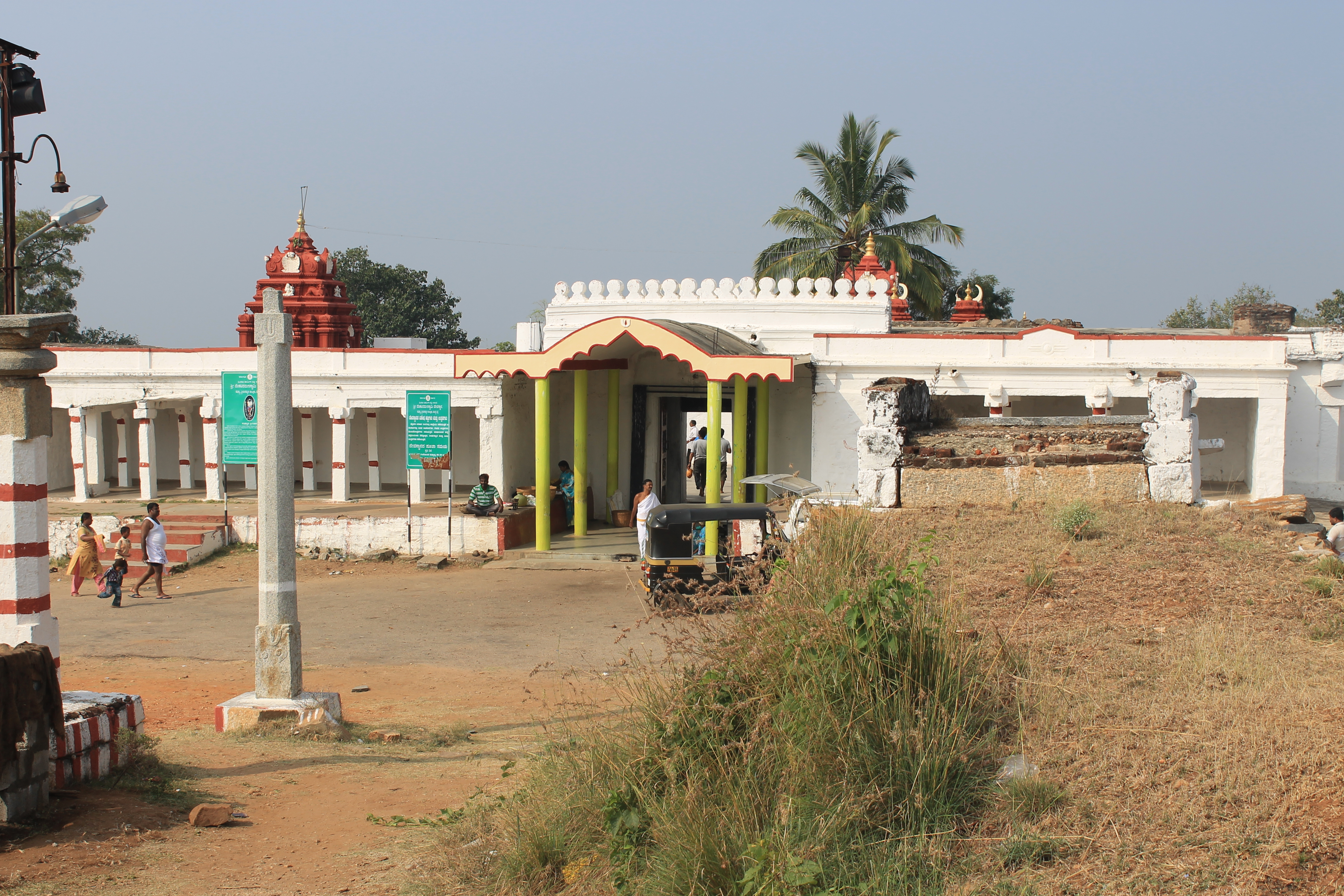
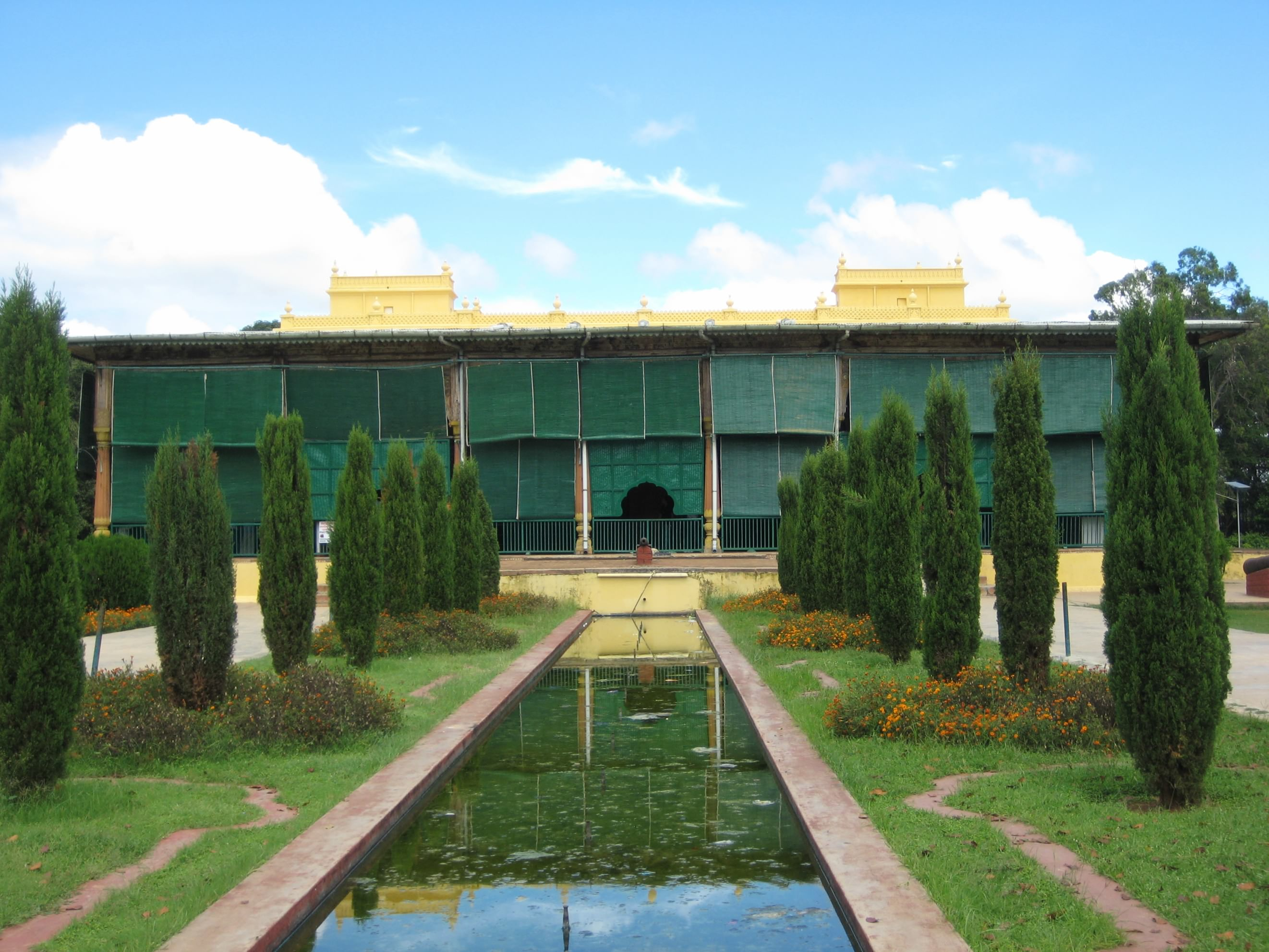
- Ranganathaswamy Temple, Srirangapatna Gumbaz Srirangapatna Fort Ranganathittu Bird Sanctuary Karighatta Temple Daria Daulat Bagh
- Nickname: Srirangapatna
- Location within Karnataka
- Coordinates: 12.414°N 76.704°E
- Country: India
- State: Karnataka
- District: Mandya

Government
  - Type: Town Municipal Council
  - Body: Srirangapatna Town Municipal Council

Area
  - Town: 11.62 km^{2} (4.49 sq mi)
  - Rural: 345 km^{2} (133 sq mi)
- Elevation: 679 m (2,228 ft)

Population (2011)
  - Town: 25,061
  - Density: 2,157/km^{2} (5,586/sq mi)
  - Rural: 155,130

Languages
  - Official: Kannada
- Time zone: UTC+5:30 (IST)
- PIN: 571 438
- Telephone code: 08236
- Vehicle registration: KA-11
- Website: www.srirangapatnatown.mrc.gov.in

Srirangapatna or Srirangapattana is a town and headquarters of one of the seven Taluks of Mandya district, in the Indian state of Karnataka. It gets its name from the Ranganathaswamy Temple consecrated around 984 CE. Later, under British rule, the city was renamed to Seringapatam. Located near the city of Mandya, it is of religious, cultural and historic importance.

The monuments on the island town of Srirangapatna have been nominated as a UNESCO World Heritage Site, and the application is pending on the tentative list of UNESCO.

== History ==
=== Hyder and Tipu ===
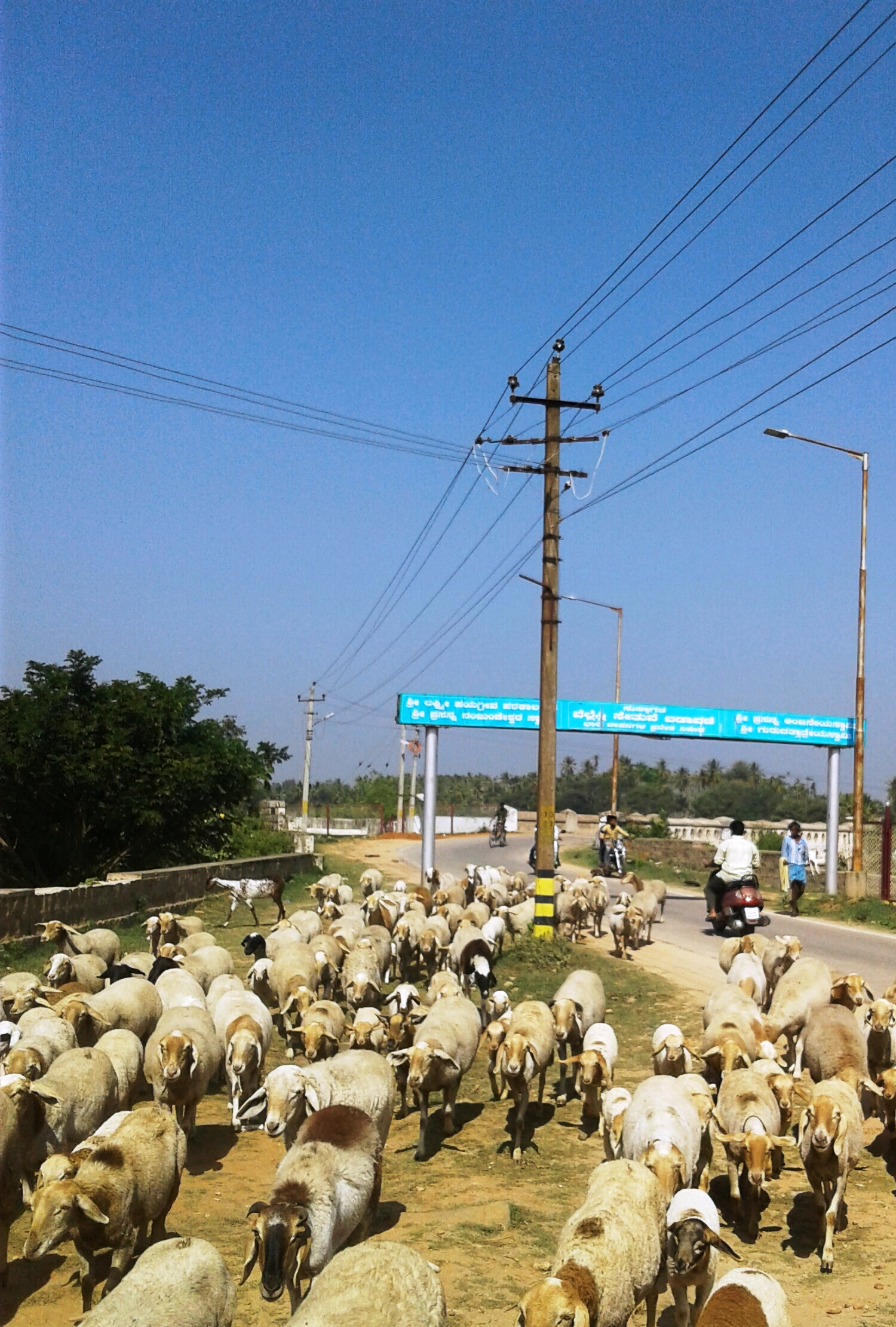
Hale Sethuway Street

Srirangapatna became the capital of Mysore under Hyder Ali and Tipu Sultan. When Tipu finally dispensed with the charade of deference to the Wodeyar Maharaja who was actually his captive, and proclaimed the "Khudadad State" under his own kingship, though the then incumbent Wodeyar scion Chamaraja Wodeyar IX was still officially the king of Mysore.

During Tipu Sultan's wars against the British, Kodavas, and Malabar rajas, he rounded up entire communities of Nairs, Kodavas, and Mangalorean Catholics in the conquered regions and deported them to Srirangapatna, where they were held in bondage until they received freedom from captivity as a result of Tipu's defeat by the British in 1799.

=== Treaty of Seringapatam, 1792 ===
The Treaty of Seringapatam (also called Srirangapatna), signed 18 March 1792, ended the Third Anglo-Mysore War. Its signatories included Lord Cornwallis on behalf of the British East India Company, representatives of the Nizam of Hyderabad and the Maratha Empire, and Tipu Sultan, the ruler of Mysore.

=== Battle of Seringapatam, 1799 ===
Srirangapatna was the scene of the last and decisive battle of the Fourth Anglo-Mysore War, fought in 1799 between Tipu Sultan, ruler of Mysore, and a combined force of 50,000 men provided equally by the Nizam of Hyderabad and the East India Company, under the overall command of General George Harris.

At the battle's climax, Tipu Sultan was killed within the fort of Seringapatam, betrayed by one of his own confidants. The spot where he fell is today marked by a memorial. Although the joint forces of the victorious army plundered Seringapatam and ransacked Tipu's palace, much of the site of the battle is still intact, including the ramparts, the Water Gate, the area where British prisoners were held, and the site of the destroyed palace.

== Demographics ==
According to the 2011 India Census Data, Srirangapatna had a population of 155,130 persons. Males constitute 50.06% and females constitute 49.93% of the total population. 9.80% of the population are under 6 years of age.

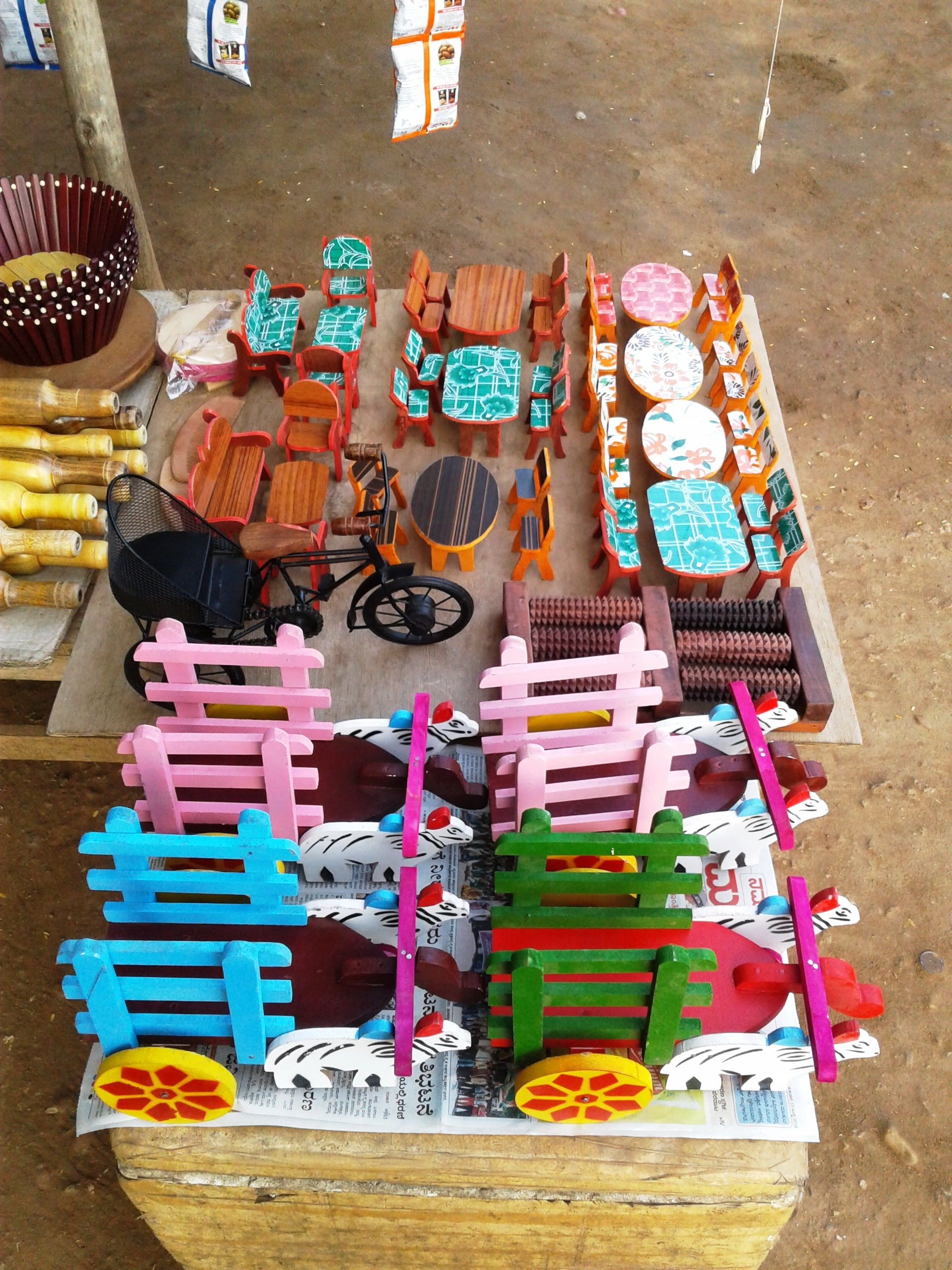
Srirangapatna town scene

Religion in Srirangapatna Urban (2011)
1. Hinduism (85.2%)
2. Islam (10.7%)
3. Others (4.06%)

== Geography ==
Srirangapatna is at 12.41°N 76.7°E. It has an average elevation of 679 metres (2,228 ft) above mean sea-level.

=== Wellesley Bridge ===
Wellesley Bridge was erected by Kingdom of Mysore's Dewan, Purnaiah on the Kaveri river in 1804. It was named after the then Governor General Marquis of Wellesley. The bridge is built of stone pillars and stone corbels and surrounded by stone girders. The bridge is very strong and has survived the heavy traffic of many years.

=== Karighatta viewpoint ===
The Karighatta viewpoint gives good panorama of Mysore and Srirangapatna cities from a height of 3,000 feet. Karighatta is a hill a few kilometres outside the 'island' town of Srirangapatna. The name Karighatta translates to "Black Hill" in Kannada. The hill supports the dry scrub jungle and many tamarind and gooseberry trees are found around the temple. A small river, Lokapavani, a tributary of Kaveri flows by the hill. The main entrance to the temple, with huge wooden doors opens into a large quadrangle, which is the main shrine for Vaikunta Srinivasa in black stone, flanked by Yoga Srinivasa (without his consort) and Bhoga Srinivasa idols. The hill may be climbed by stone steps (450 in number). A winding paved road is used for vehicular transport. The stone steps lead to a flat hilltop where the temple stands. The hillock has a superb panoramic view of Srirangapatna and Mysore. The beautiful landscape around the hill and the confluence of the Kaveri and Lokapavani rivers can be seen from atop the hill.

=== Nimishamba Temple ===
The famous Nimishamba (the incarnation of Parvathi, the wife of Shiva) temple is on the bank of the Lokapavani river. This temple too can be clearly seen from the top of the Karighatta hill. It is a belief that Parvathi will clear all the problems and troubles of her devotees within a minute (nimisha in Sanskrit), and hence the name.

=== Garrison Cemetery, Srirangapatna ===
The Garrison Cemetery is located in Srirangapatna, on the banks of the river Cauvery, about 300m from the Bangalore Mysore Highway. It has about 307 graves of the European officers killed in the final assault on Tippu Sultan in 1799, and their family members. Among the graves, there are 80 graves of the officers of the Swiss Regiment de Meuron, and the rest of the graves are their family members.

=== Scott’s Bungalow, Seringapatam ===
The Scott’s Bungalow is located in Seringapatam on the banks of the river Cauvery, at about half a mile from the Mysore Gate of the Seringapatam gate. The bungalow was the residence of Col. Scott, an officer of the Madras Army who took part in the siege of Seringapatam in 1799. The bungalow is associated with the legend and tragedy of Col. Scott. The story of Scott’s Bungalow is lamented in a poem by Walter Yeldham called The Deserted Bungalow, published in 1875.

=== Lord Harris's House ===
Between the Garrison Cemetery and Scott’s Bungalow a path leads to Lord Harris's House on the river banks. This house is known as Lord Harris's House or The Doctor's Bungalow or Puraniah's Bungalow. This house was the residence of General Harris, for a short time after the siege of Seringapatam in 1799, and went on to become headquarters of the commanding officer of Seringapatam. In 1809, the house was the scene of a mutiny by officers of the Madras Army, led by Col. Bell, against Sir. George Barlow, the Governor of Madras. Purnaiah, lived in this house after his retirement from service in 1811, and died there on 28 March 1812. A tablet on the wall records the connection of Lord Harris and Puraniah to the house.

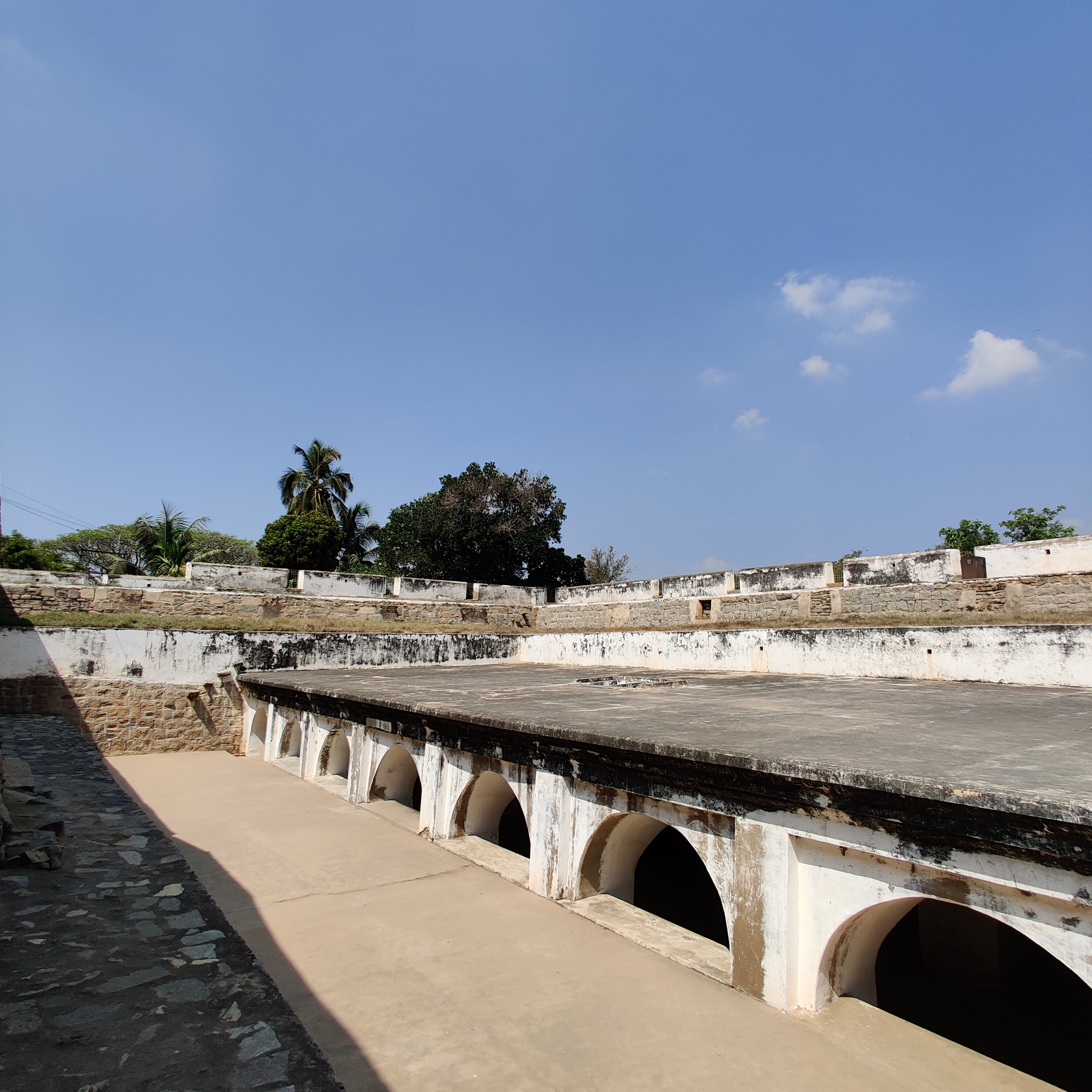
Colonel Bailey's Dungeon - ground view

=== Srirangapatna Fort ===
The fortress is in the west of the island, and is surrounded by double walls. The point at which the British broke through the walls, and thus Tipu Sultan's troops surprised, is marked by an obelisk. Also highlighted is the place where Tipu Sultan was killed by the British forces. In addition, the dungeon in which the Mysore rulers had imprisoned British soldiers.

=== Colonel Bailey's Dungeon ===
Colonel Bailey's Dungeon was the place where Tipu Sultan used to imprison all the British officers. It is near the death place memorial of Tipu Sultan and is surrounded by gardens on all four sides. Bailey was the only British officer who died in that place and could not make it through the tough conditions and so it was later named after him.

=== Ranganathittu Bird Sanctuary ===
Near the town is the Ranganathittu Bird Sanctuary, where several bird species breed, including the painted stork, open-billed stork, black-headed ibis, river tern, great stone plover and Indian shag.

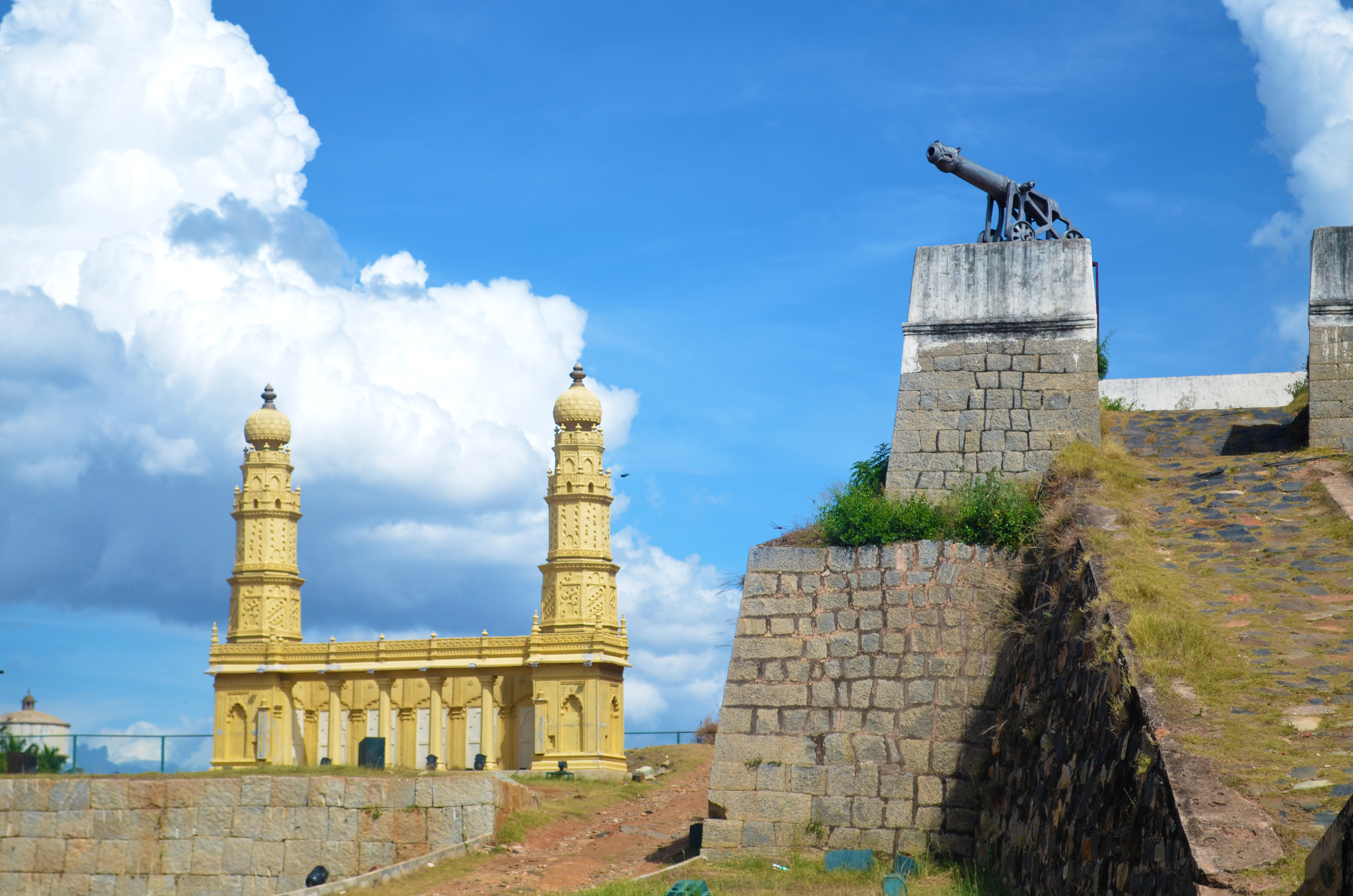
Sound and light show

== In literature ==
- Bernard Cornwell's Sharpe's Tiger is a fictionalised account of the Battle of Seringapatam. It concentrates on the exploits of the fictional character of Richard Sharpe, and the historic Arthur Wellesley, later the Duke of Wellington.
- Wilkie Collins' The Moonstone includes a prologue that takes place during the Battle of Srirangapatna, entitled "The Storming of Seringapatam (1799)", during which a British officer steals a sacred Hindu diamond that becomes the mystery at the centre of the novel.
- John Forster mentions in The Life of Charles Dickens that in a childhood playground of C.D., "he had been... delivered from the dungeons of Seringapatam, an immense pile ('of haycock'), by the victorious British ('boy next door and his two cousins')...". See p. 10 of the Everyman edition published in 1969. First published: London; Chapman and Hall, 1872–1874, in 3 volumes.

== Image gallery ==
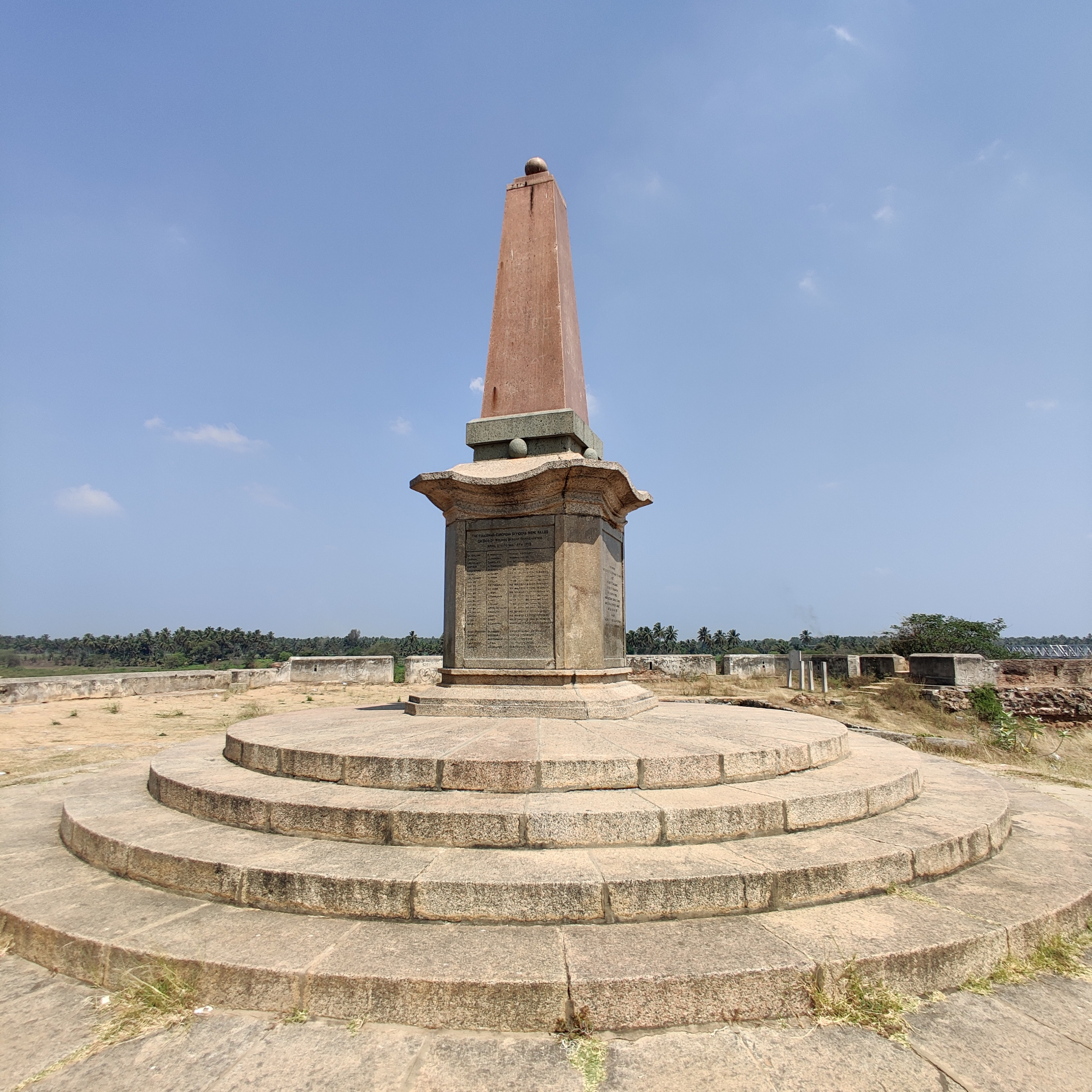
Obelisk Monument

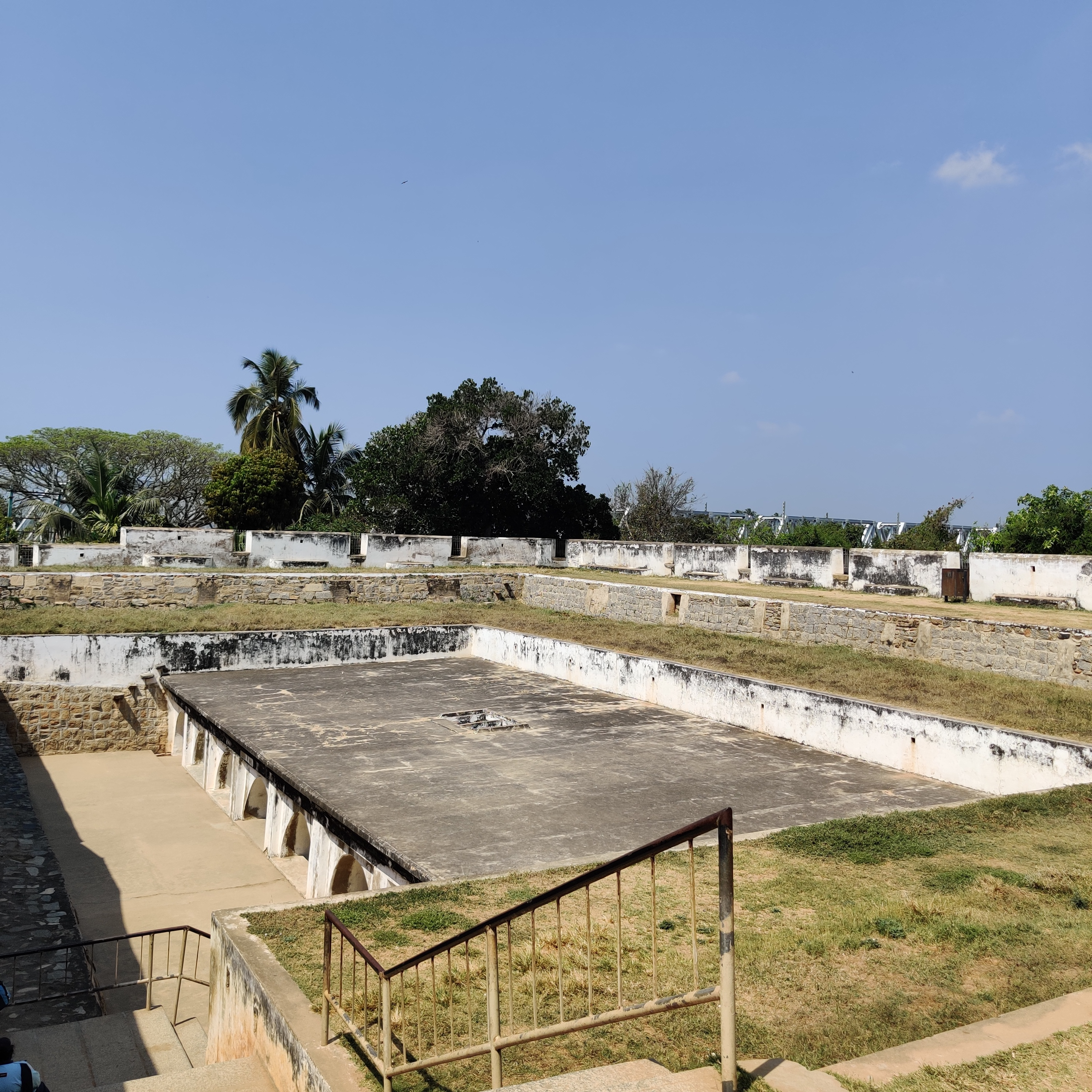
Colonel Bailey's Dungeon, Srirangapatna

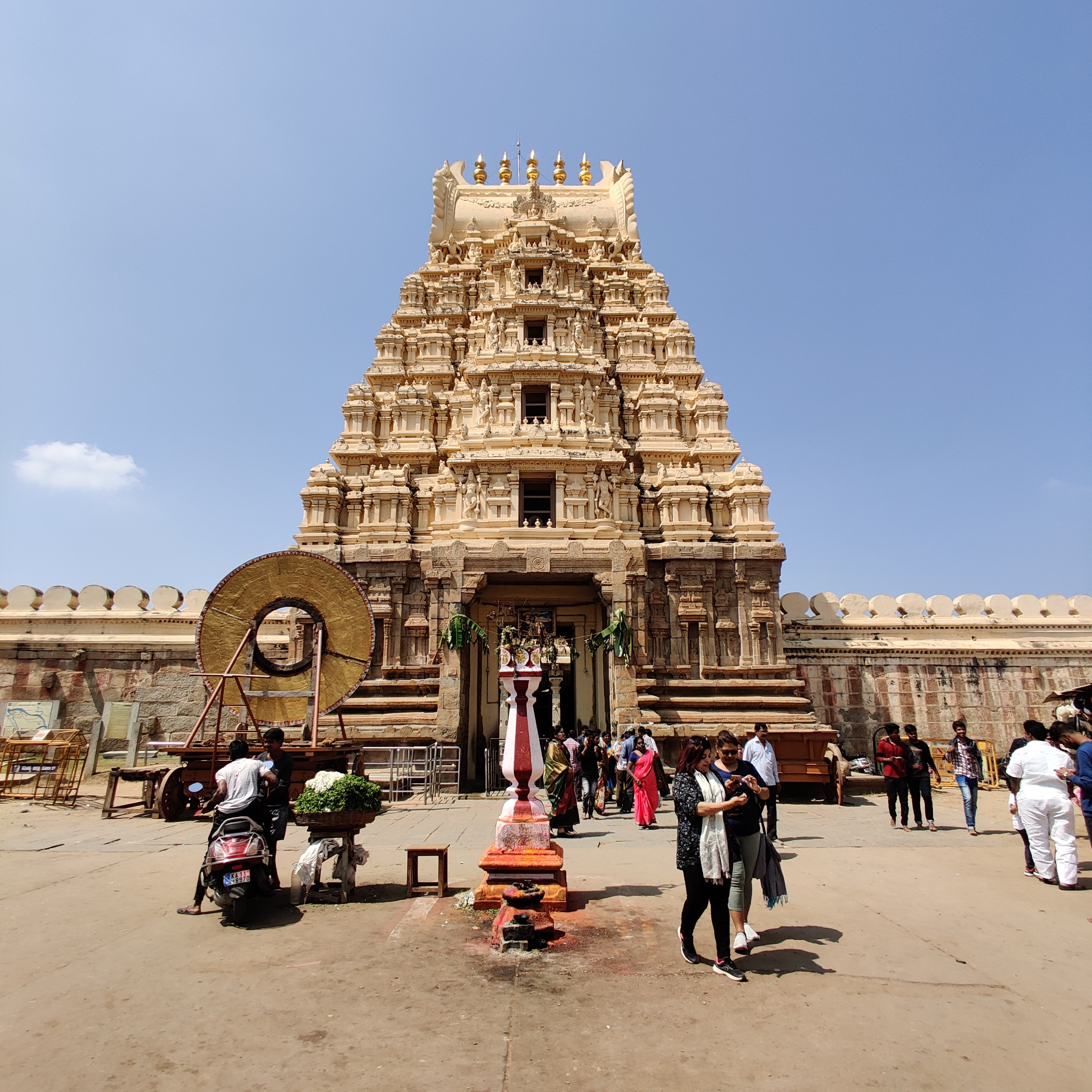
Ranganathaswamy Temple, Srirangapatna

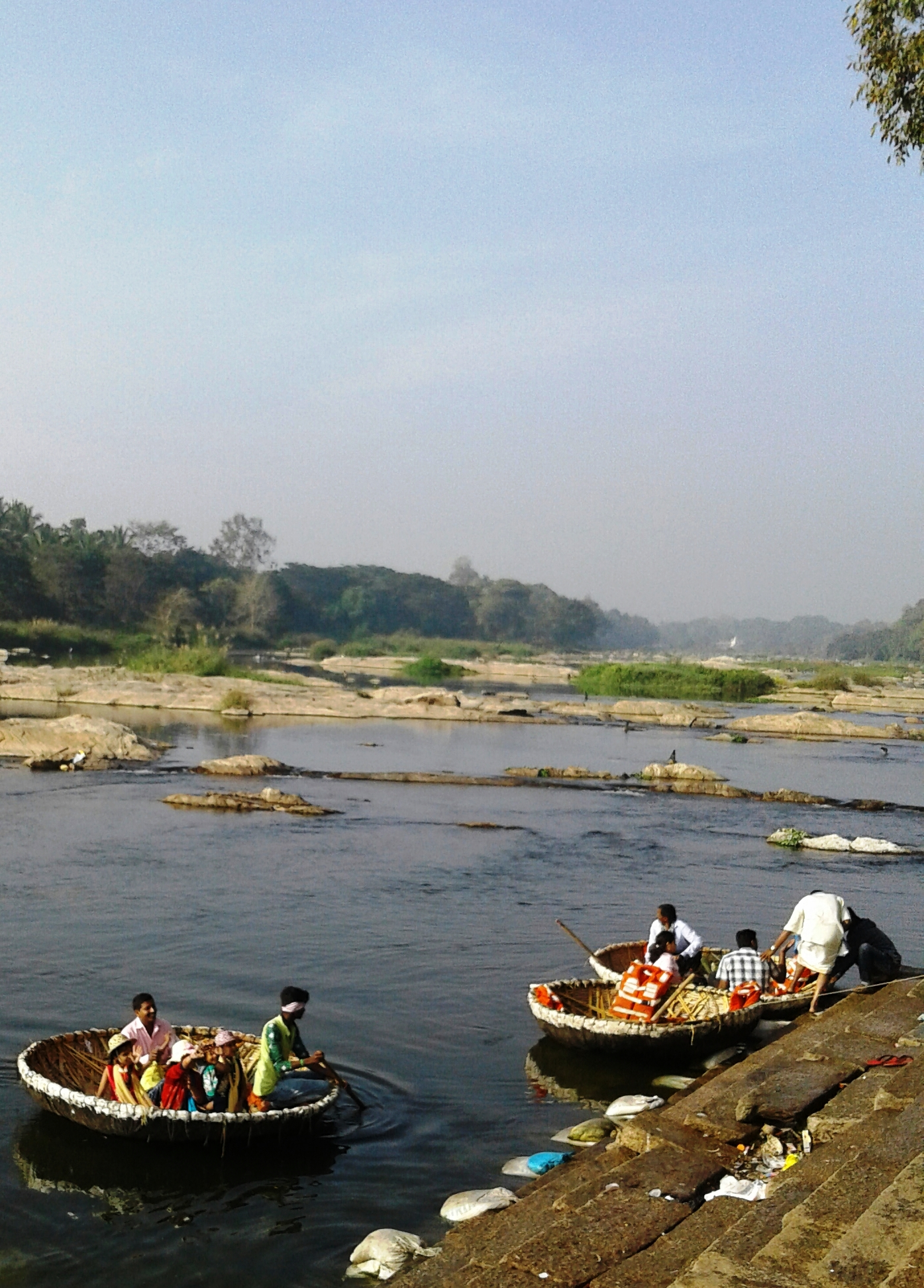
Sangama

Old Bridge

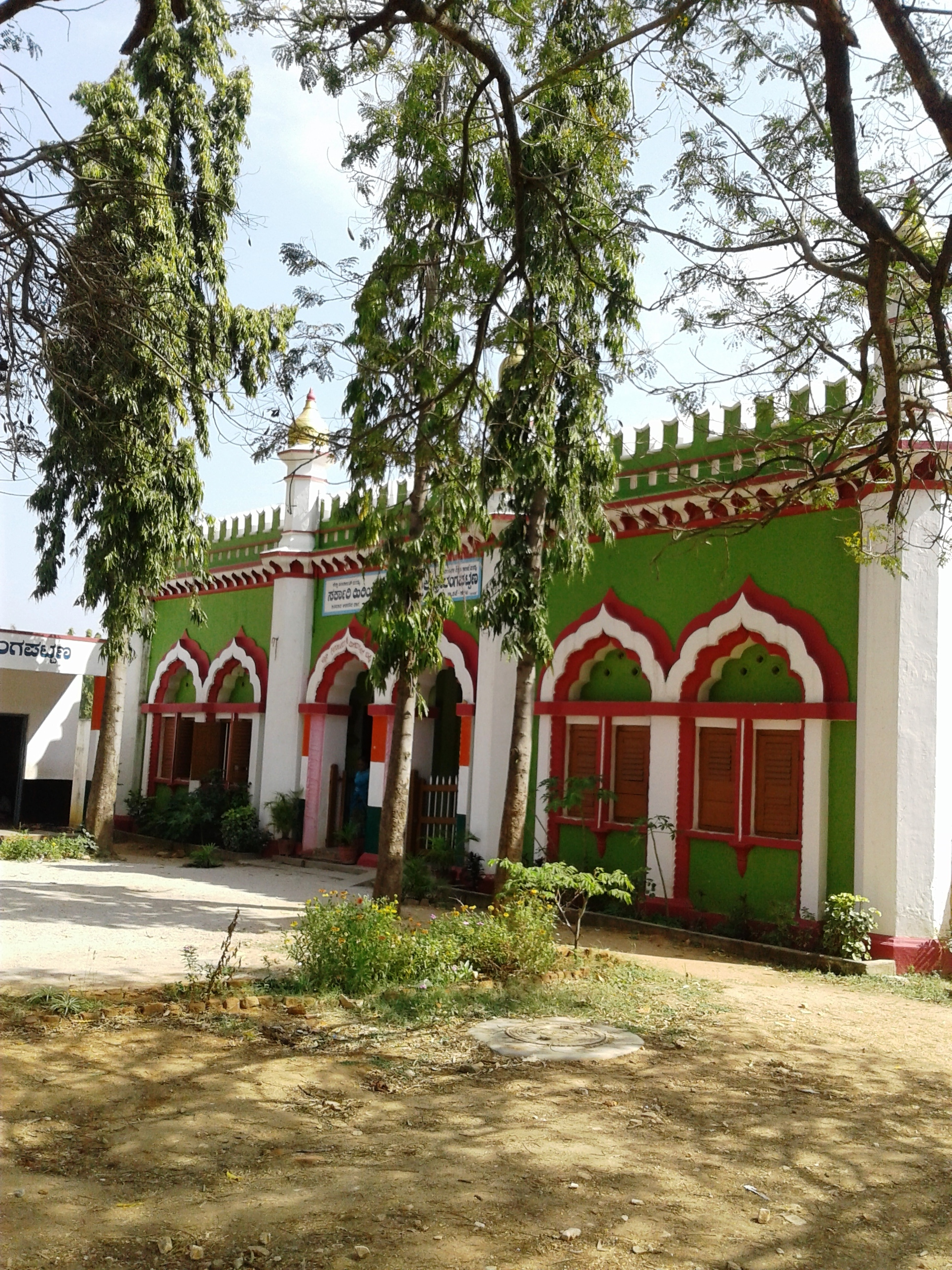
Tippu School

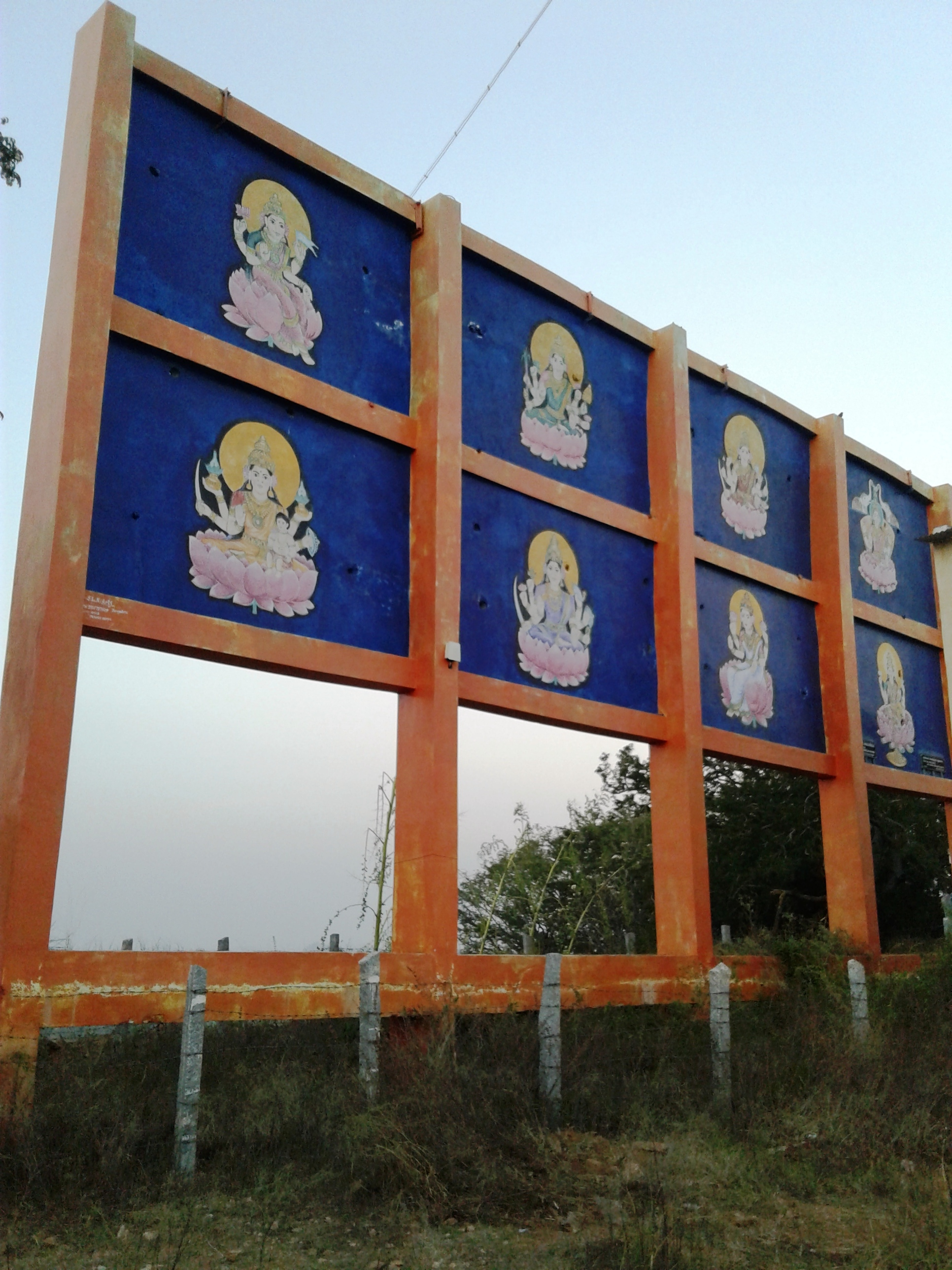
Karigatta viewpoint

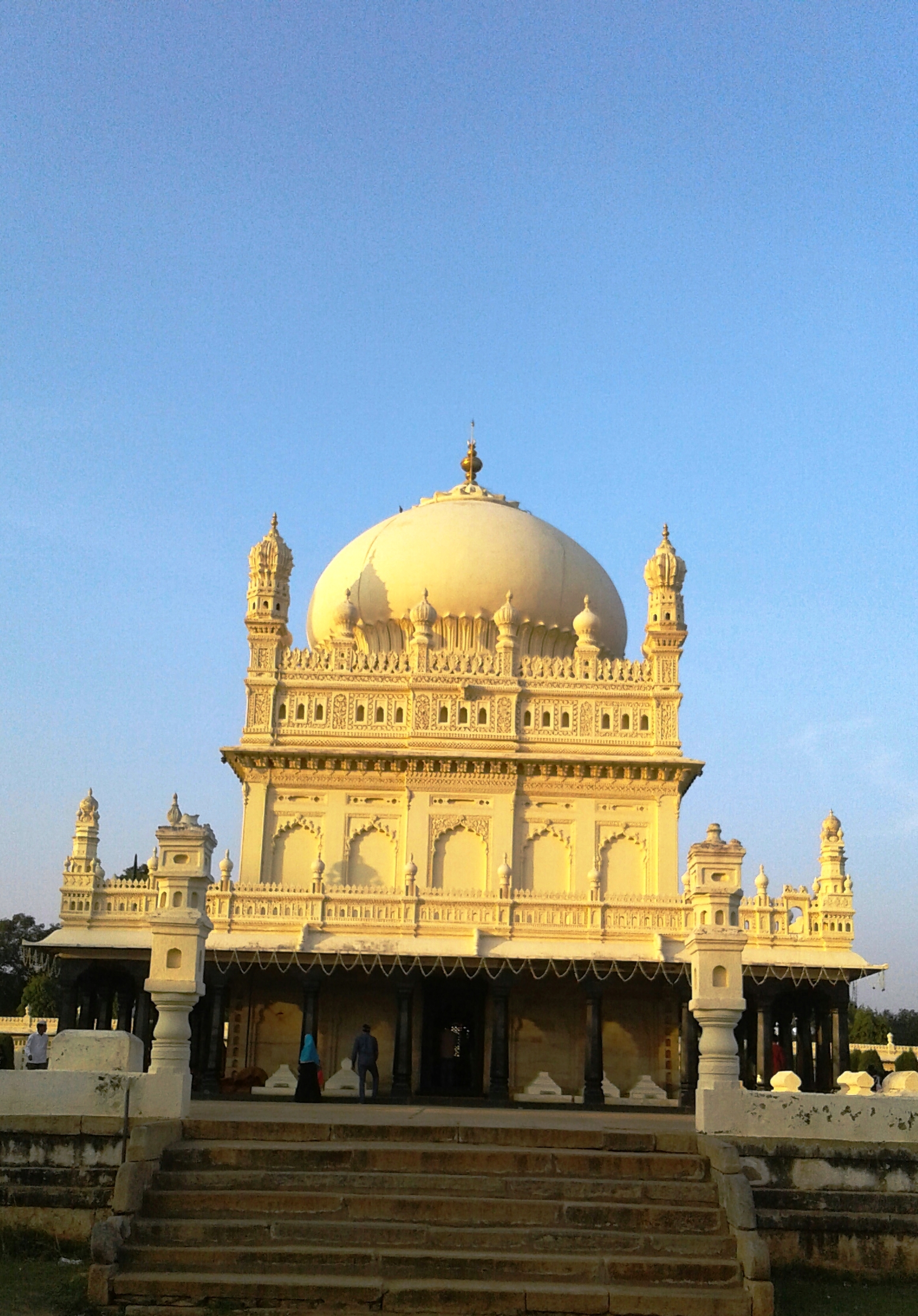
Tippu Tomb

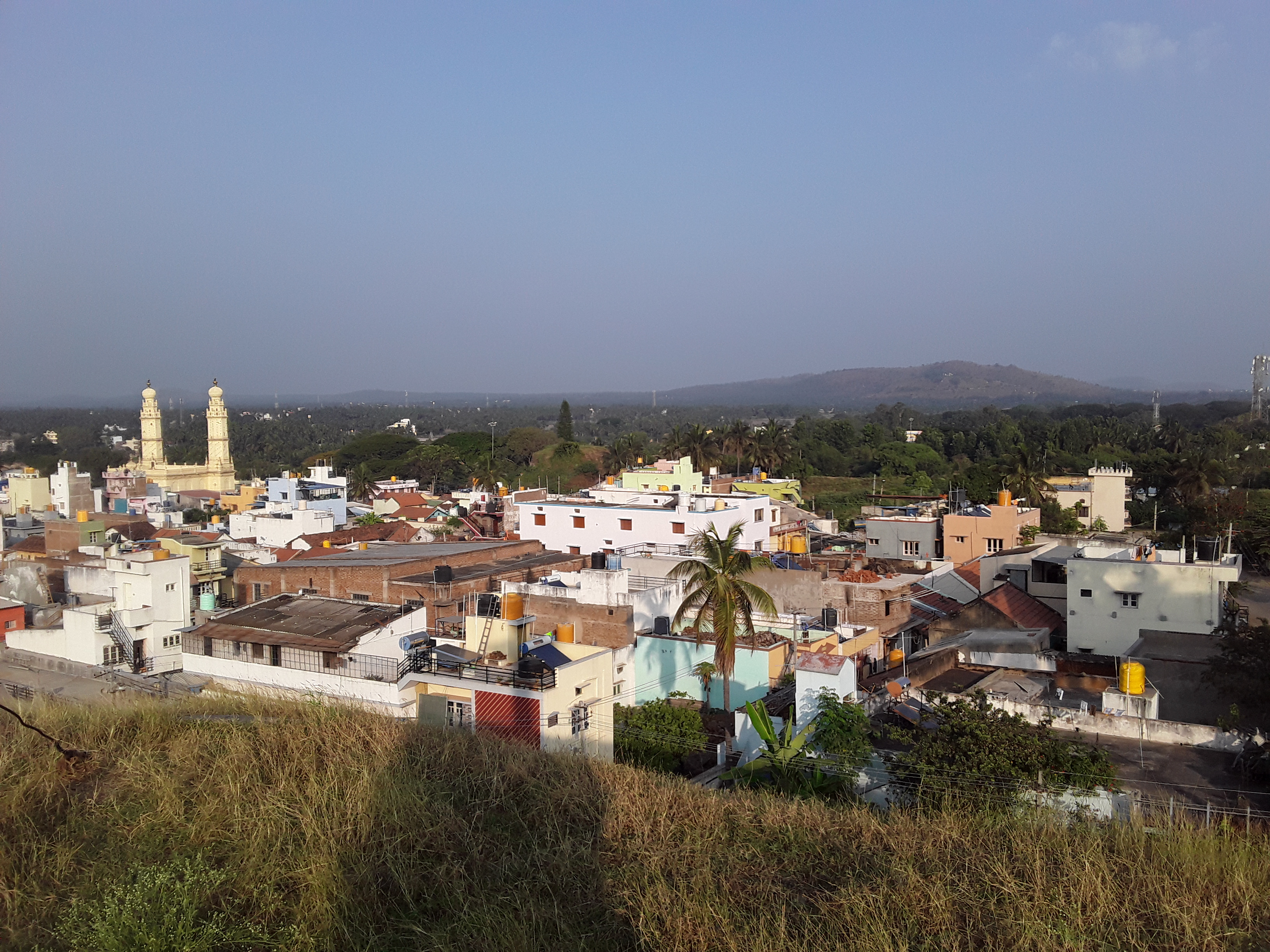
Srirangapatna

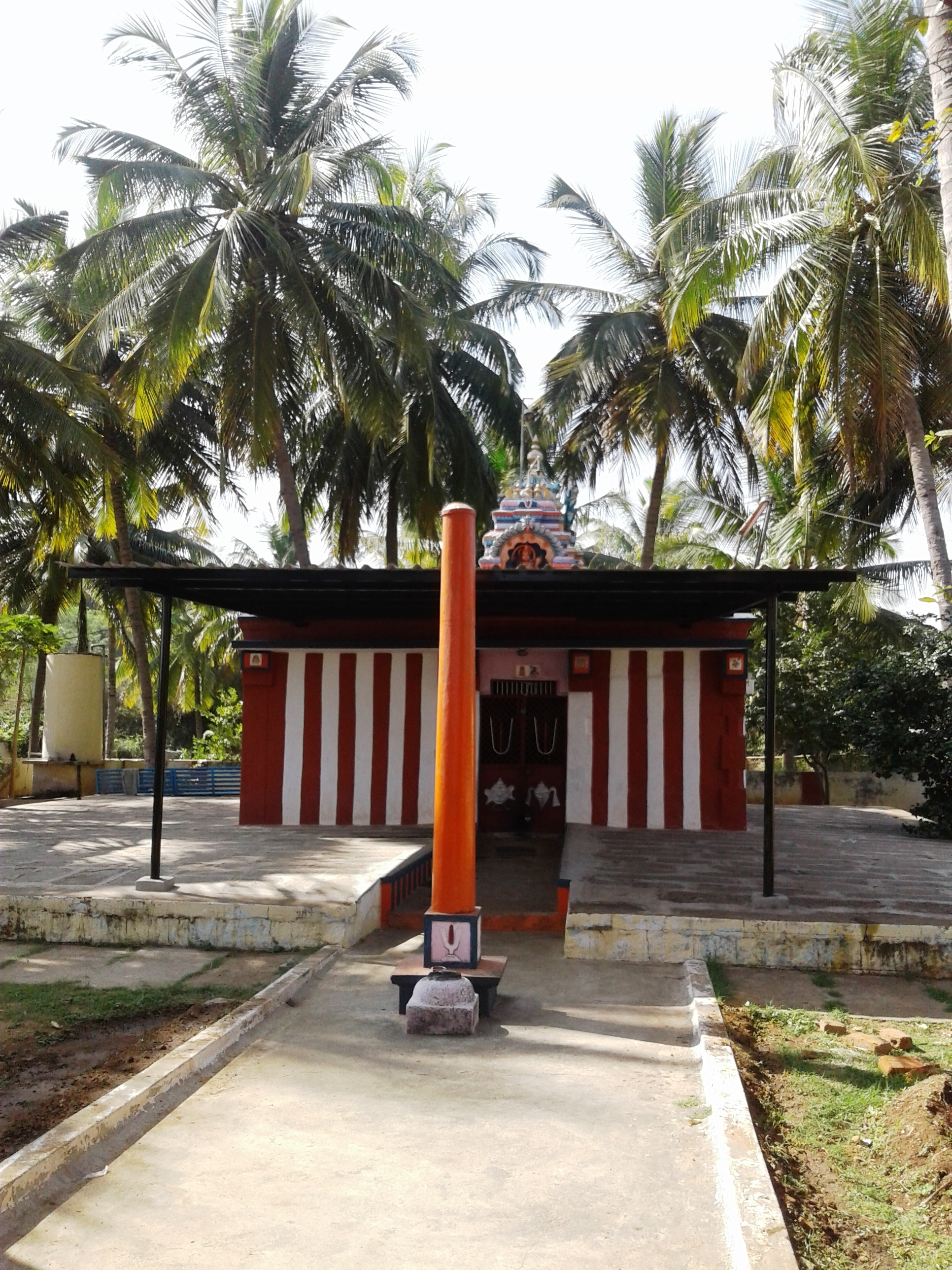
Wellesley Bridge Temple

== See also ==
- Karighatta Road
- Bannur
- Arakere
- Kodagahalli
- Tipu Sultan
