= Joseph Taylor (Medal of Honor) =

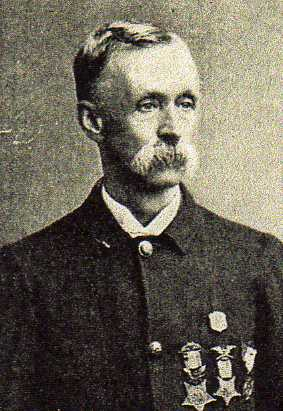
- Born: September 22, 1837; England
- Died: February 16, 1912 (aged 74)
- Burial place: Edson Cemetery, Lowell, Massachusetts
- Military career
- Allegiance: United States of America
- Branch: United States Army; Union Army
- Rank: Private
- Unit: 7th Rhode Island Infantry
- Conflicts: Battle of Globe Tavern
- Awards: Medal of Honor

Joseph Taylor (September 22, 1837 – February 16, 1912) was an English soldier who fought for the Union Army in the United States during the American Civil War. He received the Medal of Honor for valor.

== Biography ==
Taylor served in the American Civil War in the 7th Rhode Island Infantry. He received the Medal of Honor on July 20, 1897 for his actions at the Battle of Globe Tavern on August 18, 1864.

He is buried at Edson Cemetery in Lowell, Massachusetts

== Medal of Honor citation ==
Rank and organization: Private, Company E, 7th Rhode Island Infantry. Place and date: At Weldon Railroad, VA., 18 August 1865. Entered service at: Burrillville, RI. Birth: England. Date of Issue: 20 July 1897.

Citation:

While acting as an orderly to a general officer on the field and alone, encountered a picket of 3 of the enemy and compelled their surrender.

== See also ==
- List of American Civil War Medal of Honor recipients: T-Z
