= Joseph Walters Taylor =

American politician

Joseph Walters Taylor (July 12, 1820 – 1872), also sometimes mis-identified as Joseph Wright Taylor, was an Alabama politician, newspaper editor, and lawyer.

== Early life ==
Joseph Walters Taylor was born on July 12, 1820, in Kentucky. He was educated at Cumberland College (Princeton, Kentucky), graduating in 1838).

== Career ==
Taylor served in the Alabama legislature from Greene County from around 1845 to 1849. In addition to serving in the Alabama legislature, Taylor also edited the Eutaw Whig newspaper and delivered a series of addresses on political and educational topics in both Alabama and Virginia.

His addresses included A Plea for the University of Alabama in 1847, The Young American: His Education, Duties, and Rewards: An Address Delivered Before The Adelphi and Franklin Societies of Howard College in 1849, Henry Clay: His Life, Character, and Services in 1852, The Southern University: Its Origin, Present Condition, Wants, and Claims: An Address Delivered before the Belles Lettres and Clariosophic Societies of the Southern University, on Their Anniversary Occasion, July 2, 1861, and An Address Before the Literary Societies of Washington and Lee University in 1871.

After the Civil War, Taylor purchased the Tuscaloosa Independent Monitor newspaper and renamed it the Tuscaloosa Times. In the 1870s, Taylor also worked to raise money for Washington and Lee University.

== Death ==
Taylor died in 1872.
