= John Taylor (doctor) =

John Taylor M.D. (d. 6 December 1821, Shiraz) was a Scottish missionary in Gujarat, then a government surgeon in Bombay. He translated Bhaskaracharya's Lilavati into English (Bombay, 1816). He died in 1821 at Shiraz, Persia where he had gone for the benefit of his health.
