= Mandyakoppalu =

Settlement in India

Coordinates: 12.394581°N 76.800878°E

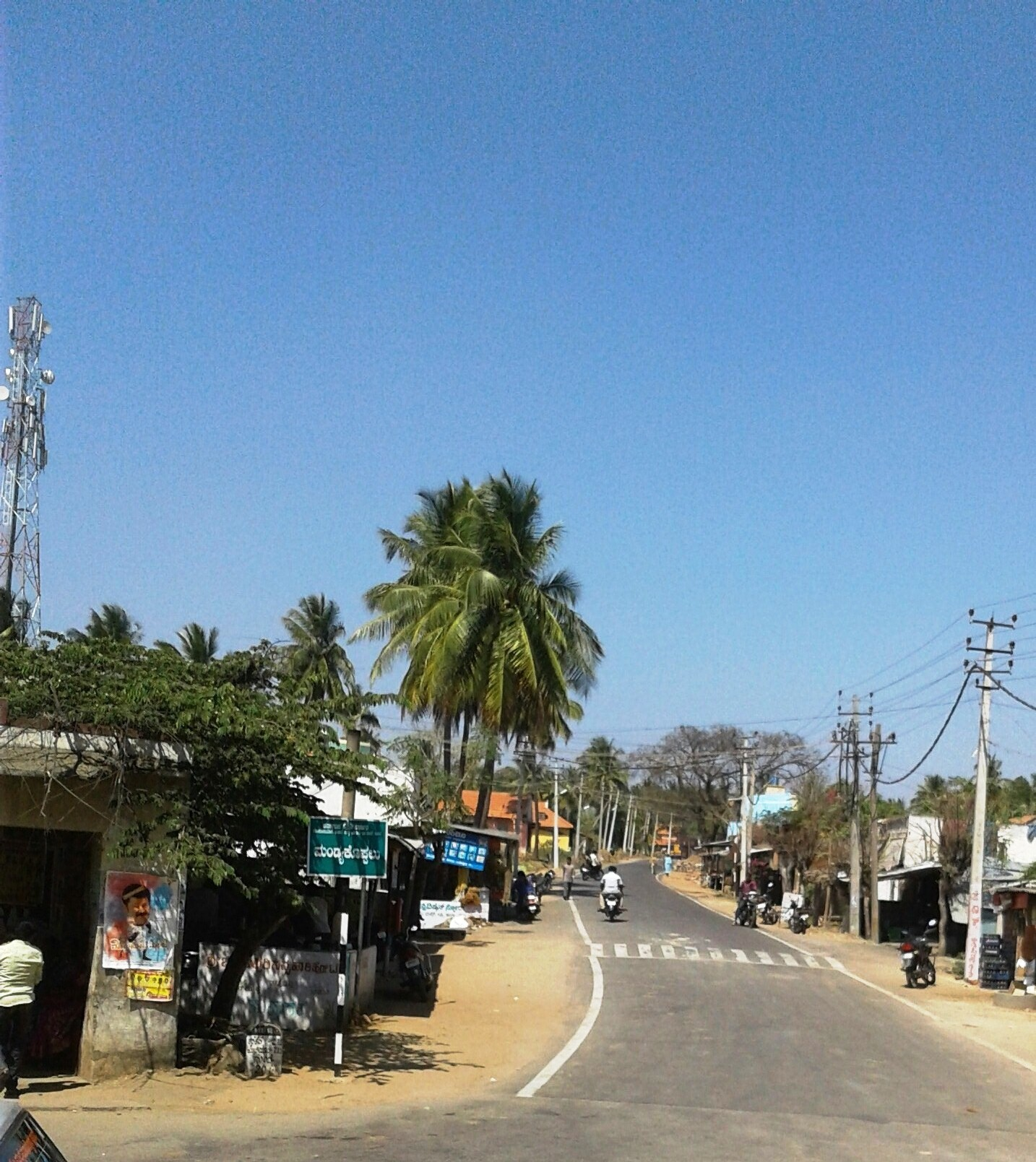
Mandyakoppalu Junction

Mandyakoppalu is a small village and road intersection in Mandya district of Karnataka state, India.

== Location ==
Mandyakoppalu is located between Srirangapatna and Bannur on the Srirangapatna - Bannur road. This road goes on the northern side of the Cauvery river.

The village is 21 km from Mandya town.

== Postal code ==
There is a post office at Mandyakoppalu and the pin code is 571415 (Arakere).

== Nearby villages ==
Vadiyandahalli (2 km), Mahadevapura (3 km), Arakere (3 km), Hangarahalli (4 km), Paramandahalli (4 km).

== See also ==
- Karighatta Road
- Kodagahalli
