= B. S. Sannaiah =

Indian writer (1928–2021)

Shri B.S Sannaiah
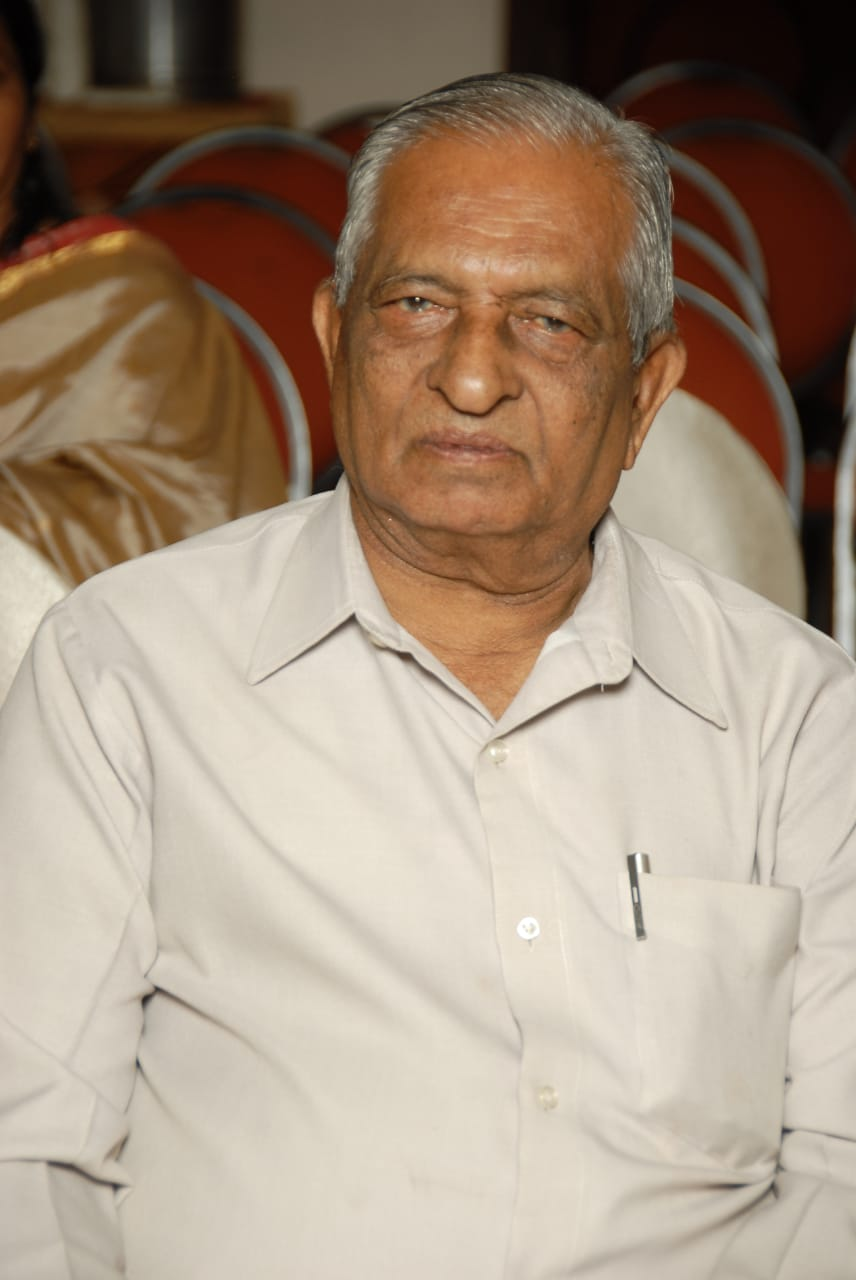
- B.S Sannaiah in 2013
- Born: 18 June 1928; Bhoganahalli, Piriyapatna, Mysore, Kingdom of Mysore, British India
- Died: 12 May 2021; Paduvaralli, Mysore, Karnataka, India
- Education: University of Mysore
- Occupations: Writer, Editor, Textual critic of kannada & jain manuscripts
- Spouse: Jayalakshmamma (1951)
- Children: 1 Son,6 daughters.
- Writing career
- Pen name: B.S Sannaiah
- Language: Kannada
- Genres: Textual criticism Translator; Editor ಗ್ರಂಥ ಸಂಪಾದಕ
- Notable works: Vardhamana Purana by Nagavarma(ವರ್ಧಮಾನ ಪುರಾಣ), Neminatha Purana by Nemichandra(ನೇಮಿನಾಥ ಪುರಾಣ), Thorave ramayana by kumara valmiki(ತೊರವೆ ರಾಮಾಯಣ),Rajaavali kathasaara by Devachandra(ರಾಜಾವಳೀ ಕಥಾಸಾರ)
- Notable awards: Sahitya Akademi Award; Chavundaraya Prashasti; Suvarna gowrava prashasthi

B.S Sannaiah (18 June 1928 - 12 May 2021) was an Indian writer in Kannada language. He was born in Bhoganahalli, Piriyapatna talluk, Mysore, Karnataka. He worked as a Editor, Textual critic and a follower and protector of ancient Archaic works & manuscripts. He had undertaken study and research in various manuscript works in Kannada & jain literature and made some of the major contributions in the field.

== Early life ==
B.S Sannaiah was born on June 18, 1928, in Bhoganahalli Piriyapatna Mysore, Karnataka to C. Sannegowda and Boramma couple. Sannaiah's elementary schooling started in Koolimata Bhoganahalli Piriyapatna, Mysore, Karnataka and continued his schooling in Ravandhur.In 1949, He completed his SSLC at krishnarajanagara. He continued his college studies in Yuvaraja college Mysore. From University of Mysore He obtained a B.A degree in 1954 and M.A degree in the Kannada language (1955). he had also obtained Bachelor of Library Science from University of Mysore in 1966. He had perceived a Diploma Course in Archives keeping from National archives of India, Delhi.

== Career ==
In 1956, B.S Sannaiah had started the profession as assistant editor and later as assistant director(1958) in Oriental Research Institute Mysore.From 1966-1967, He worked as Assistant Librarian at University of Mysore .He also worked as assistant director in ಕುವೆಂಪು ಕನ್ನಡ ಅಧ್ಯಯನ ಸಂಸ್ಥೆ editing section (1972). Later he worked as deputy director(in charge) for editing section of ಕುವೆಂಪು ಕನ್ನಡ ಅಧ್ಯಯನ ಸಂಸ್ಥೆ, Manasa Gangotri, Mysore in 1986. He retired from the university of Mysore in 1988.

Upon his retirement from the University of Mysore, From 1993 to 2020 he had worked as Head of department(Manuscript division) National Institute of Prakrit Studies and Research, Shravanabelagola, Hassan, Karnataka

== Personal life ==
B.S Sannaiah was married to JayaLakshmamma. The couple had six daughters and a son.

== Literary works ==
B.S Sannaiah's areas of work include ancient Kannada literature, Jainology and textual criticism.Sannaiah had published more than ninety five books in various genres of literature such as literary criticism, Textual criticism, Travel literature, Translation.

B.S Sannaiah's important publications are noted below : Most of the books of B S Sannaiah can be found with sapna book house

=== Swarachita (ಸ್ವರಚಿತ) ===
- Grantha samrakshane (ಗ್ರಂಥ ಸಂರಕ್ಷಣೆ)
- Hasthaprathishasthra parichaya( ಹಸ್ತಪ್ರತಿಶಾಸ್ತ್ರ ಪರಿಚಯ)
- Bhanduvarma (ಬಂಧುವರ್ಮ)
- Praacheena kannada grantha sampadane(ಪ್ರಾಚೀನ ಕನ್ನಡ ಗ್ರಂಥ ಸಂಪಾದನೆ)
- Pampa Mahakavi (ಪಂಪ ಮಹಾಕವಿ)
- Vachana sahithyadalli marithandegalu (ವಚನ ಸಾಹಿತ್ಯದಲ್ಲಿ ಮಾರಿತಂದೆಗಳು)
- Shakthi kavi ranna (ಶಕ್ತಿ ಕವಿ ರನ್ನ)
- Kannadadhalli theerthankara kavyagalu (ಕನ್ನಡದಲ್ಲಿ ತೀರ್ಥಂಕರ ಕಾವ್ಯಗಳು)
- Praacheena kannada kavyagalu (ಪ್ರಾಚೀನ ಕನ್ನಡ ಕಾವ್ಯಗಳು)

=== Champoo (ಚಂಪೂ) ===
- Vardhamana Purana - Nagavarma (ವರ್ಧಮಾನ ಪುರಾಣ)
- Neminatha Purana - Nemichandra (ನೇಮಿನಾಥ ಪುರಾಣ)
- Harivamshabhyudayam - Bandhuvarma (ಹರಿವಂಶಾಭ್ಯುದಯಂ)
- Jeevasambodhanam - Bandhuvarma (ಜೀವಸಂಬೋಧನಂ)
- SaahasaBhimavijayam - Ranna (ಸಾಹಸಭೀಮವಿಜಯಂ) - ರಾಗೌ ಜೊತೆ
- Ajitanaathapuraanatilakam - Ranna (ಅಜಿತನಾಥಪುರಾಣತಿಲಕಂ)- ರಾಗೌ ಜೊತೆ
- Ratnakarandaka -aayathavarma (ರತ್ನಕರಂಡಕ)
- pushpanjali mattu jeevadayaashtami nompigalu - chandana varni
- theerthankara vardhamaana kannada kavya samputa - Nagavarma (ತೀರ್ಥಂಕರ ವರ್ಧಮಾನ ಕನ್ನಡ ಕಾವ್ಯ ಸಂಪುಟ)

=== Shatpadi (ಷಟ್ಪದಿ) ===
- Thorave ramayana - kumara valmiki (ತೊರವೆ ರಾಮಾಯಣ)
- Jaimini bharata - Lakshmeesha (ಜೈಮಿನಿ ಭಾರತ) - ರಾಗೌ ಜೊತೆ
- Dronaparva sangraha - kumaravyasa (ದ್ರೋಣಪರ್ವ ಸಂಗ್ರಹ) - ಹೆಚ್ ನರಸಣ್ಣ ಜೊತೆ

=== Saangathya (ಸಾಂಗತ್ಯ) ===
- Sobagina Sone - Deparaja (ಸೊಬಗಿನ ಸೋನೆ)
- Madanamohiniya kathe - narasimha(ಮದನಮೋಹಿನಿಯ ಕಥೆ)
- Basava shikhamani - jeenasena dheshavrati (ಬಸವ ಶಿಖಾಮಣಿ)
- bhujabali charithe - Padma rasa (ಭುಜಬಲಿ ಚರಿತೆ)
- Madanachakreshwara charite - Devarasa (ಮದನಚಕ್ರೇಶ್ವರ ಚರಿತೆ)
- Mohana tharangini sangraha - kanakadasa (ಮೋಹನ ತರಂಗಿಣೀ ಸಂಗ್ರಹ)
- Parshvanatha charite - Shantikeertimuni (ಪಾರ್ಶ್ವನಾಥ ಚರಿತೆ)
- Purudeva charite - Shantikeertimuni (ಪುರುದೇವ ಚರಿತೆ)
- Mruthyunjaya charite - doddanaanka (ಮೃತ್ಯುಂಜಯ ಚರಿತೆ)
- Soori panditha charite - kamalahvaya (ಸೂರಿ ಪಂಡಿತ ಚರಿತೆ)

=== Vachanagalu (ವಚನಗಳು) ===
- Molige marayyana vachanagalu (ಮೋಳಿಗೆ ಮಾರಯ್ಯನ ವಚನಗಳು)
- Kolashantayya mattu madhuvayyagala vachanagalu (ಕೋಲಶಾಂತಯ್ಯ ಮತ್ತು ಮಧುವಯ್ಯಗಳ ವಚನಗಳು)
- Shivalenka manchanna mattu dakkeya bommannagala vachanagalu (ಶಿವಲೆಂಕ ಮಂಚಣ್ಣ ಮತ್ತು ಢಕ್ಕೆಯ ಬೊಮ್ಮಣ್ಣಗಳ ವಚನಗಳು)
- Arivina maritandhegala vachanagalu (ಅರಿವಿನ ಮಾರಿತಂದೆಗಳ ವಚನಗಳು)
- Babbi bachayya mattu meremindayyagala vachanagalu (ಬಬ್ಬಿ ಬಾಚಯ್ಯ ಮತ್ತು ಮೆರೆಮಿಂಡಯ್ಯಗಳ ವಚನಗಳು)
- Urilingayya mattu gajeshamasanayyana vachanagalu (ಉರಿಲಿಂಗಯ್ಯ ಮತ್ತು ಗಜೇಶಮಸಣಯ್ಯನ ವಚನಗಳು)
- Devara dasimayyana vachanagalu (ದೇವರ ದಾಸಿಮಯ್ಯನ ವಚನಗಳು)
- Yakshagaana sahithya - Aliya lingaraja (ಯಕ್ಷಗಾನ ಸಾಹಿತ್ಯ)

=== Others (ಇತರೆ ಗ್ರಂಥಗಳು) ===
- Rajaavali kathasaara - Devachandra (ರಾಜಾವಳೀ ಕಥಾಸಾರ)
- Sathidharmasaara - Bandhuvarma (ಸತಿಧರ್ಮಸಾರ)
- Neethi saarodaya (ನೀತಿಸಾರೋದಯ)
- Sahithya sourabha (ಸಾಹಿತ್ಯ ಸೌರಭ)
- Kavyavalokana (ಕಾವ್ಯಾವಲೋಕನ)
- Sakalavaidhya samhithaasaararnava(ಸಕಲವೈದ್ಯ ಸಂಹಿತಾಸಾರಾರ್ಣವ)
- Vaidhyakanda -Bhommayya (ವೈದ್ಯಕಂದ)
- OshadhiKosha (ಓಷಧಿಕೊಶ)

=== Travel story (ಪ್ರವಾಸಕಥನ ) ===
- Naanu hogidde amerikege(ನಾನು ಹೋಗಿದ್ದೆ ಅಮೆರಿಕೆಗೆ)

=== Descriptive indexes (ಸೂಚಿಗಳು) ===
- Kannada hastha pratigala varnanathmaka soochigalu (Descriptive Catalogue ofKannada Manuscripts) (ಕನ್ನಡ ಹಸ್ತಪ್ರತಿಗಳ ವರ್ಣನಾತ್ಮಕ ಸೂಚಿಗಳು)
- Kannada hastha pratigala microfilm soochi(ಕನ್ನಡ ಹಸ್ತಪ್ರತಿಗಳ ಮೈಕ್ರೋಫಿಲ್ಮ್ ಸೂಚಿ)
- Prakruth hastha pratigala varnanathmaka soochigalu(Descriptive Catalogue of prakruth Manuscripts)(ಪ್ರಾಕೃತ ಹಸ್ತಪ್ರತಿಗಳ ವರ್ಣನಾತ್ಮಕ ಸೂಚಿಗಳು)
- sanskrit hastha pratigala varnanathmaka soochigalu(Descriptive Catalogue of Sanskrit Manuscripts)(ಸಂಸ್ಕೃತ ಹಸ್ತಪ್ರತಿಗಳ ವರ್ಣನಾತ್ಮಕ ಸೂಚಿಗಳು)

=== Translation (ಅನುವಾದ ) ===
- Vastu sangrahalayadha moola thathvagalu(ವಸ್ತು ಸಂಗ್ರಹಾಲಯದ ಮೂಲ ತತ್ವಗಳು) - Fundamentals of museum by Dr M.L Nigam in english
- Amarukaviya premageethegalu(ಅಮರುಕವಿಯ ಪ್ರೇಮಗೀತೆಗಳು) - Amaruka in sanskrit by Amarukavi
- Jeevasambodhane(ಜೀವಸಂಬೋಧನೆ) - Original by Banduvarma
- khagendramanidarpanam(ಖಗೇಂದ್ರಮಣಿದರ್ಪಣಂ) - Original by Mangaraja

=== Thathva grantahgalu (ತತ್ವಗ್ರಂಥಗಳು) ===
- Gommatasaara(ಗೊಮ್ಮಟಸಾರ (ಕೇಶವಣ್ಣನ ಕನ್ನಡ ಟೀಕು ಸಹಿತ) ಮೊದಲಬಾರಿಗೆ ಕನ್ನಡದಲ್ಲಿ)
- Anubhavamrutha - Mahalingaranga(ಅನುಭವಾಮೃತ)

=== Congratulatory book (ಅಭಿನಂದನಾ ಗ್ರಂಥ) ===
- ಸಣ್ಣಯ್ಯನವರ ಅಭಿನಂದನಾ ಗ್ರಂಥ "ಪರಿಣತ" from ಡಾ. ರಾಗೌ & ಡಾ. ಬೋರೇಗೌಡ ಚಿಕ್ಕಮರಳಿ.

== Awards and recognitions ==
- B.S Sannaiah was President of the 13th Kannada Sahitya Sammelana (Mysore district Kannada Literary Conference) held at Bannur in July, 2014.
- Karnataka Sahitya Academy Award for "ನೇಮಿನಾಥ ಪುರಾಣ" (1961)
- B.S Sannaiah was President of the ಅಖಿಲ ಕರ್ನಾಟಕ ನಾಲ್ಕನೆಯ ಹಸ್ತಪ್ರತಿ ಶಾಸ್ತ್ರದ ಸಮ್ಮೇಳನಾಧ್ಯಕ್ಷರಾಗಿ ಗೌರವ ಸಂದಿದೆ.
- Karnataka Sahitya Academy Award for "ನೇಮಿನಾಥ ಪುರಾಣ" (1961)
- Karnataka Sahitya Academy Award for "ವರ್ಧಮಾನ ಪುರಾಣ" (1974)
- Devaraja bahaddur award for "ವರ್ಧಮಾನ ಪುರಾಣ" (1974)
- ತೀ ನಂ ಶ್ರೀಕಂಠಯ್ಯ award for "ವರ್ಧಮಾನ ಪುರಾಣ" (1974)
- Karnataka Sahitya Academy Award for "ಸಾಹಸಭೀಮ ವಿಜಯ" (1985)
- Karnataka Sahitya Academy Award for "ಅಜಿತತೀರ್ಥಂಕರ ಪುರಾಣ" (1988)
- Karnataka Sahitya Academy Award for "ಜೈಮಿನಿ ಭಾರತ" (1993)
- ತೀ ನಂ ಶ್ರೀಕಂಠಯ್ಯ award for "ಜೈಮಿನಿ ಭಾರತ" (1993)
- Swasti Sri Deevendrakeerthi Bhattraka award for "ಪಾರ್ಶ್ವನಾಥ ಚರಿತ" (1995)
- Shri Gommatesha vidhyapeeta award, Shravanabelagola
- Shri Chavundaraya award from kannada sahitya parishat(1999)
- P. Shanthilal award for "ಜೀವ ಸಂಬೋಧನಂ" (2001)
- P. Shanthilal award for "ರತ್ನ ಕರಂಡಕಂ" (2002)
- B.S Sannaiah was President of the 4th Jain sahithya sammelana (2004)
- Sediyapu award ,ರಾಷ್ಟ್ರಕವಿ ಮಂಜೇಶ್ವರ ಗೋವಿಂದ ಪೈ ಸಂಶೋಧನಾ ಕೇಂದ್ರ, Udupi ( 2004)
- Dakshina Kesari Kannada Sahitya Award, Lion's club, Mysore
- Manuscript expert award from Kannada University (2006)
- P. Shanthilal award for "ಪಂಪಮಹಾಕವಿ" (2007)
- Swasti Sri Deevendrakeerthi award for "ತೀರ್ಥಂಕರ ವರ್ಧಮಾನ ಕಾವ್ಯಾ ಸಂಪುಟ" (2011)
- Kumarashri award Bagalkot (2012)
- Shri Sahithya award from BM Sri Memorial Foundation Bangalore (2015)
- Shamba Joshi award (2015)
- Suvarna gowrava prashasthi from Karnataka Sahitya Academy (ಕರ್ನಾಟಕ ಸಾಹಿತ್ಯ ಅಕಾಡೆಮಿ)(2017)
- Siddhantha Keerthi award" from Hombuja Shivamogga, Karnataka

== External References ==
B.S Sannaiah Books at Sapna books
