= Adagoor =

Adagoor may refer to places in India:

- Adagoor, Mysore, Karnataka
- Adagoor, Tumkur, Karnataka
