= Kodagahalli =

Village in Karnataka, India

Coordinates: 12.376966°N 76.824045°E

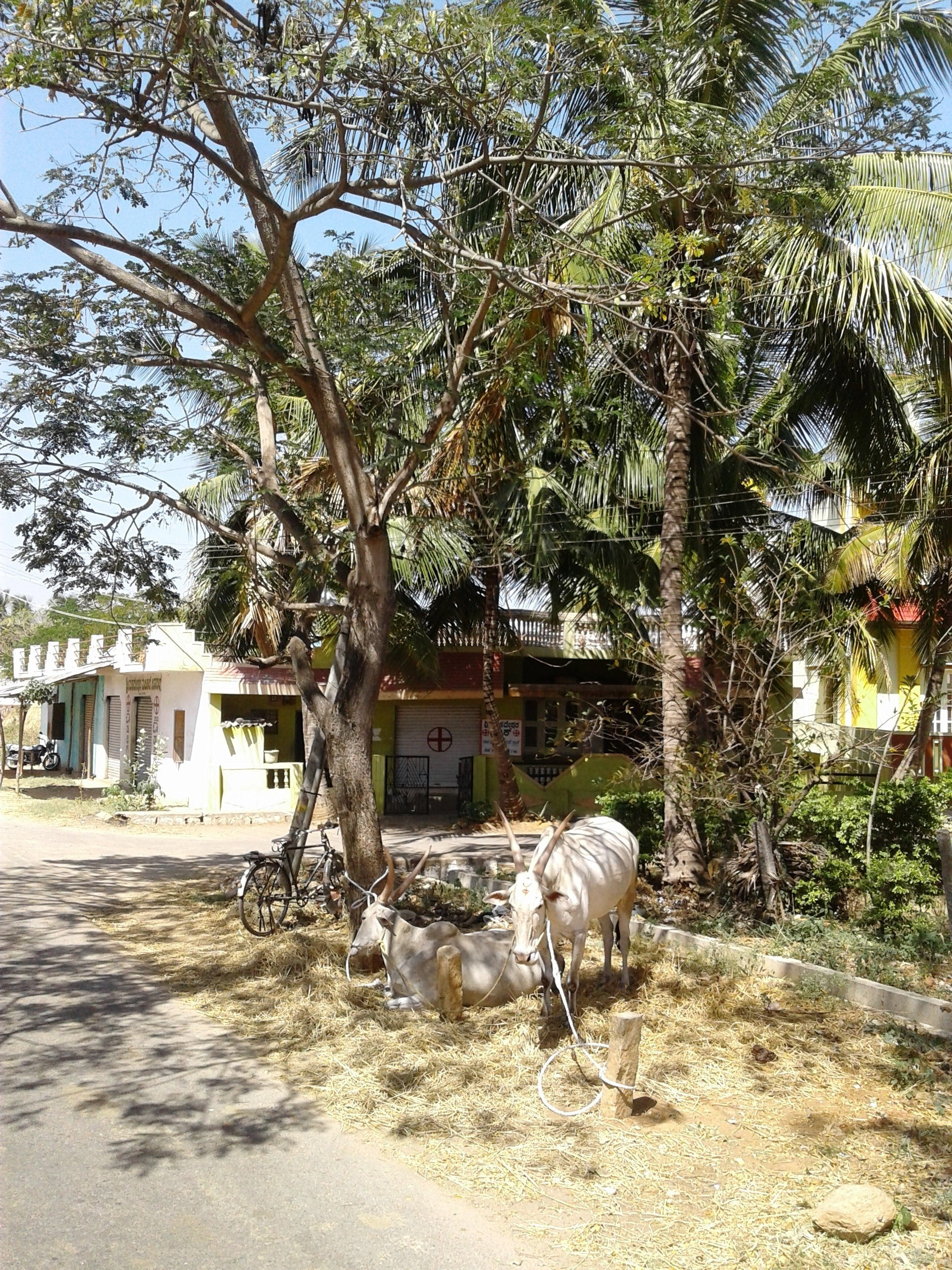
Kodagahalli Village, Bannur

Kodagahalli is a small village in Mysore district of Karnataka state, India.

== Location ==
Kodagahalli is located between Bannur and Srirangapatna on Karighatta road.

== See also ==
- Mandyakoppalu
- Arakere
- Karighatta Road
- Bannur

== Image gallery ==
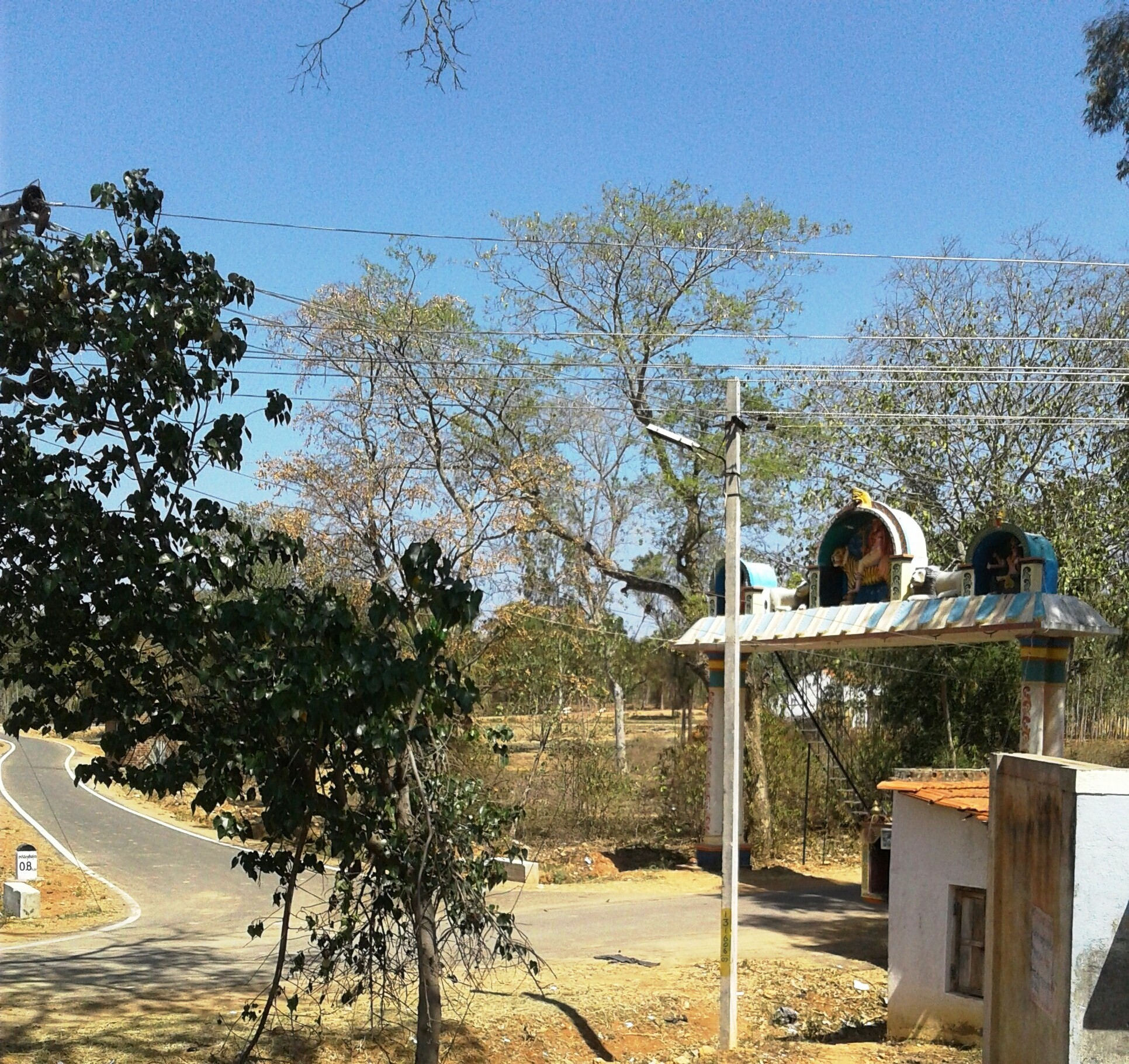
Aravattikoppal

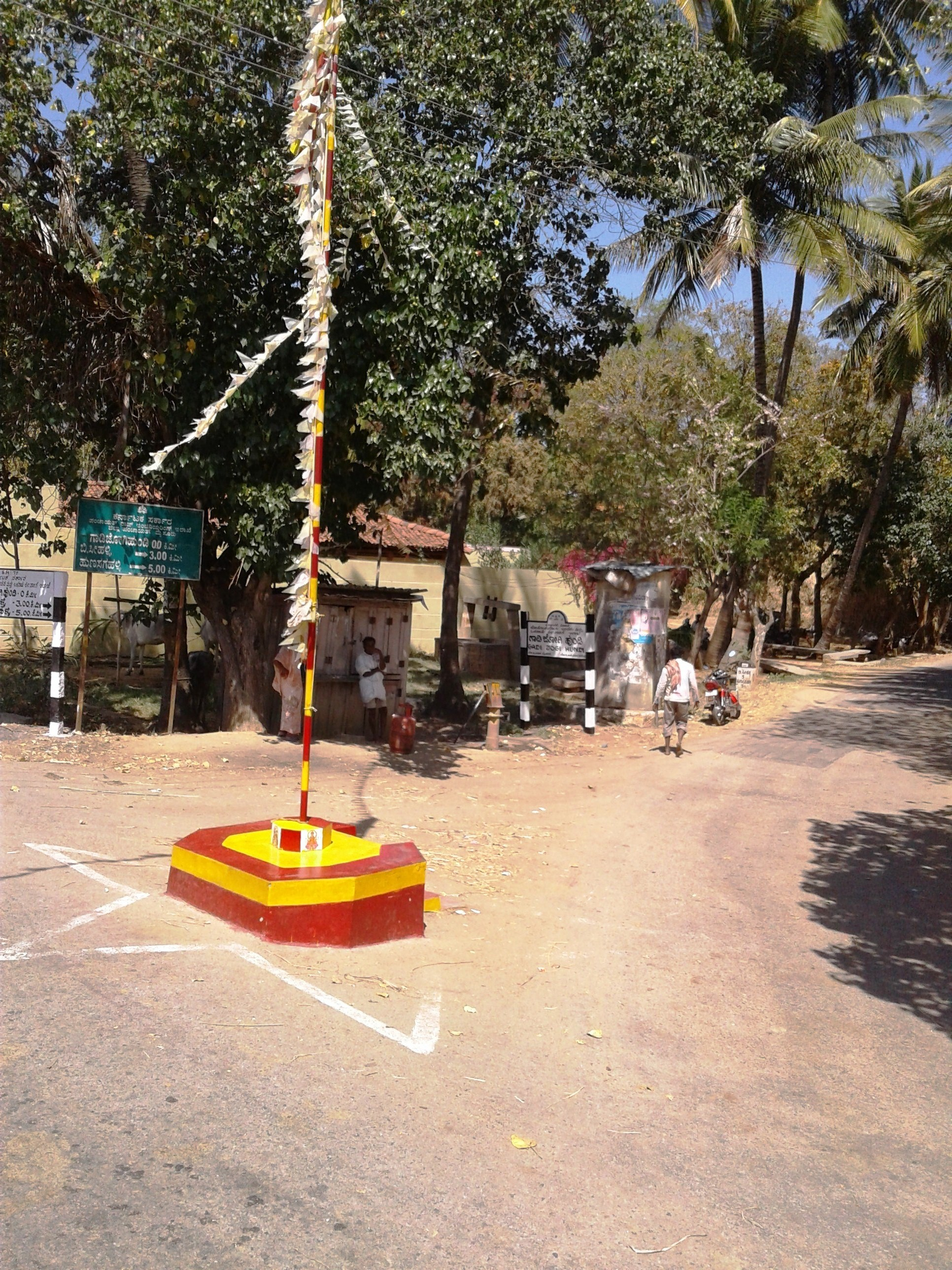
Cheehalli
