= Saji Varghese =

Indian academic and social entrepreneur

Dr. Saji Varghese
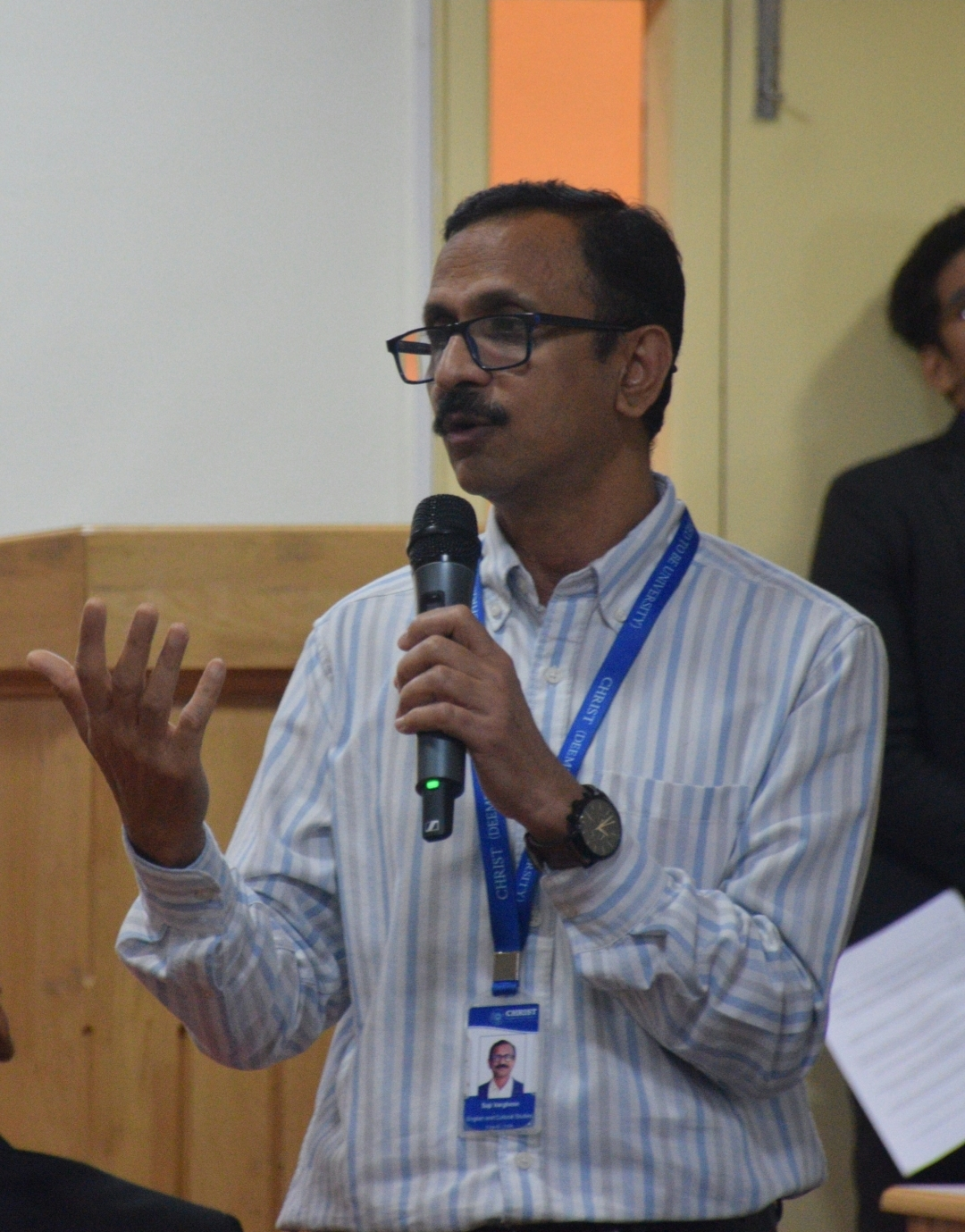
- Varghese in 2025
- Born: Maharashtra, India
- Occupations: Academic, social entrepreneur
- Known for: Founder of Brown Reed Agri-Waste Innovations (Sunbird Straws)

Academic background
- Education: Mount Carmel Convent School, Chandrapur; Dr. Ambedkar College, Nagpur
- Alma mater: Nagpur University, PhD

Academic work
- Discipline: English studies
- Institutions: Christ University, Bengaluru

Saji Kurungatil Varghese is an Indian academic and social entrepreneur. He is an Associate Professor of English at Christ University, Bengaluru, and the founder of Sunbird Straws, a Bengaluru-based startup that makes biodegradable drinking straws and pens using naturally dried, fallen coconut leaves.

== Early life ==
Saji Kurungatil Varghese was born and raised in Nagpur division, Maharashtra. He did his schooling from Mount Carmel Convent School, Chandrapur, and holds an M.A. from Dr. Ambedkar College, Nagpur. He earned his Ph.D. in English from Nagpur University.

== Career ==
Varghese started his career teaching English in Nagpur. He then moved to Bengaluru, where he joined Christ University; as of 2025, he has been teaching for over 25 years and is currently an associate professor of English. He also leads the centre for Design and Innovation for Social Entrepreneurship (DAISE) at the university.

=== Sunbird Straws ===
In October 2017, during a walk on the Christ University campus grounds, Varghese came across a fallen coconut leaf. According to him, one of its leaflets was pointing upwards, appearing to be curled like a straw. After a closer look, he discovered that coconut leaves have their own epicuticular wax, making them water-resistant and antimycotic, causing them to be perfect for straws. Upon further inspection, he also found that the leaves could be softened without losing their structural integrity. In 2019, Varghese co-authored an article on the same in the Asian Journal of Plant Sciences. This ultimately inspired the creation of Sunbird Straws, which he founded in 2020 alongside students Chirag MG and Sandeep U after two years of research and experimentation. In the same year, Varghese was granted a patent for his innovation.

The company aims to replace non-biodegradable, single-use plastic straws and reduce pollution and CO_{2} emissions. It employs about 200 rural women across coastal India, and makes around 700,000 straws a month. It was initially funded by Christ University, and incubated by IIM Bangalore's incubation centre, NSRCEL. Most leaves for the purpose are sourced from Karnataka, Kerala and Tamil Nadu, and the company has production centres in Kasargod and Palakkad in Kerala, Thoothukudi in Tamil Nadu and Bannur in Karnataka. While the straw-making process initially was time- and labour-intensive, the company has now developed technologically advanced machines and conveyor systems to rapidly increase output, reduce costs, and increase profits. As of 2020, Sunbird Straws has exported to over 25 countries.

== Awards and honours ==
In 2019, Varghese was invited to be a part of the President of India's business delegation to the Philippines. He also won the Swadeshi Startup Award from the Indian Institute of Technology, Delhi in 2018. His startup was also the only Indian startup to be shortlisted for the Youth Ecopreneur Award in Mongolia in 2023. He is also a recipient of the Honey Bee Network Creativity and Inclusivity Award, and the Swiss Re Shine Entrepreneur Award.
