= Yachenahalli =

Yachenahalli ಯಾಚೇನಹಳ್ಳಿ
- Village(Grama Panchayathi)
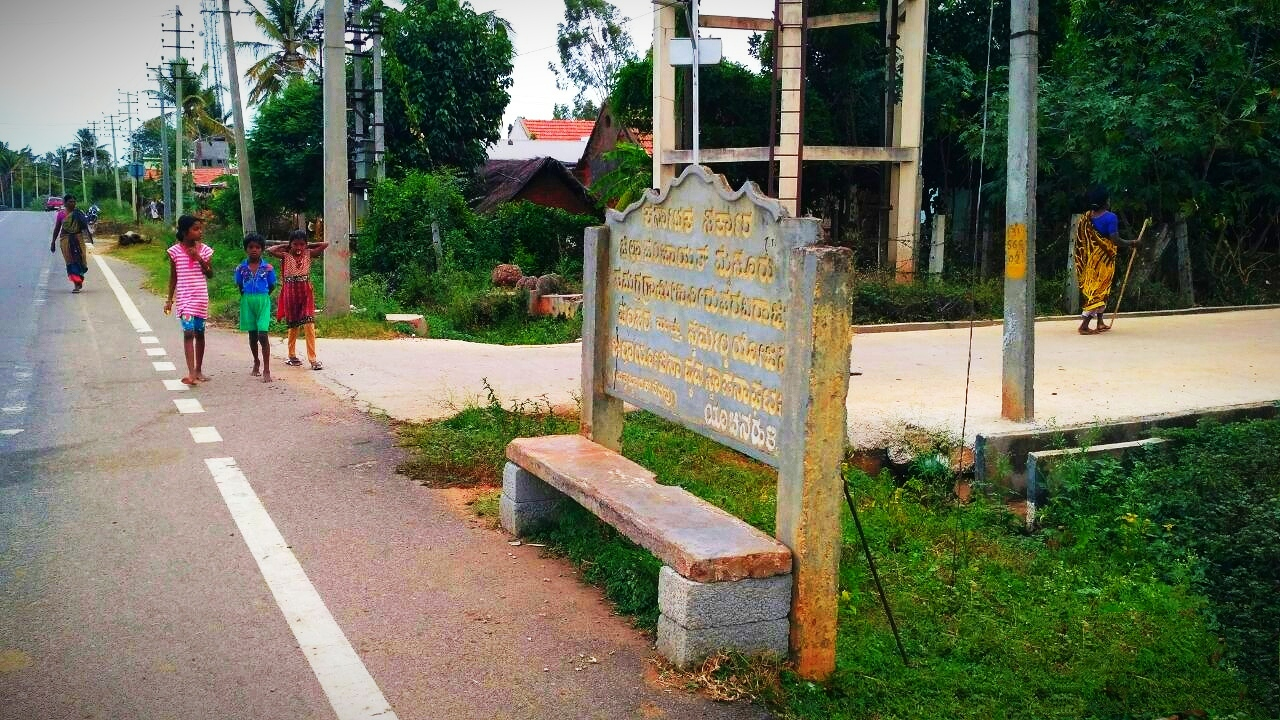
- Name board of Yachenahalli

- Location in Karnataka, India
- Coordinates: 12.400781°N 76.898536°E
- Country: India
- State: Karnataka
- District: Mysore

Government
  - Type: Panchayati raj (India)
  - Body: Gram panchayat
- Elevation: 654 m (2,146 ft)

Population (2011)
  - Total: 3,168

Languages
  - Official: Kannada, English
- Time zone: UTC+5:30 (IST)
- PIN: 571101
- ISO 3166 code: IN-KA
- Vehicle registration: KA-55
- Website: karnataka.gov.in

Yachenahalli (Kannada: ಯಾಚೇನಹಳ್ಳಿ) is a panchayat town in Mysore district in the state of Karnataka, India. It is located 35 km from Mysore and 17 km from Mandya. The nearest city is Bannur with 10 km distance.

== History ==
=== Dwapara Yuga History ===
The name of the village Yachenahalli is derived from "Yachaka Na Halli," meaning "Beduva Halli" in Kannada. According to history, Lord Krishna, during the Dwapara Yuga, visited this area to beg (beduva) for food. The village name reflects its historical significance, and it is said that his horse was tied in a nearby village, which became known as Turuganoor.

=== Tippu Sultan ===
Tippu Sultan is also known to have traveled from Srirangapatna to Malavalli via Yachenahalli, which is why we have the famous road named Sultan Road.

== Geography ==
Yachenahalli is located at 12.400781°N 76.898536°E. It has an average elevation of 654 metres (2145 feet).

== Transport ==
=== By Road ===
Bannur, Tirumakudal - Narsipur, Malavalli, Kollegal, Mandya are the nearby by towns, having road connectivity to Yachenahalli which is located on Bannur - Mandya Main Road.

== Demographics ==
2001 Census Details

As of 2001 India census, Yachenahalli had a population of 3,190. Males constitute 51% of the population and females 49%. Yachenahalli has an average literacy rate of 59%, lower than the national average of 59.5%; with 54% of the males and 46% of females literate. 11% of the population is under 6 years of age.

=== 2011 Census Details ===
Yachenahalli Local Language is Kannada. Yachenahalli Village Total population is 3168 and number of houses are 749. Female Population is 49.6%. Village literacy rate is 57.1% and the Female Literacy rate is 24.4%.

=== Population ===
| Census Parameter | Census Data |
|---|---|
| Total Population | 3168 |
| Total No of Houses | 749 |
| Female Population % | 49.6 % (1571) |
| Total Literacy rate % | 57.1 % (1809) |
| Female Literacy rate | 24.4 % (774) |
| Scheduled Tribes Population % | 0.0 % (0) |
| Scheduled Caste Population % | 17.7 % (560) |
| Working Population % | 43.2 % |
| Child(0 -6) Population by 2011 | 294 |
| Girl Child(0 -6) Population % by 2011 | 46.6 % (137) |

== See also ==
- Bannur
- Mandya
- Aarakere
- Somanathapura
- T. Narasipura
- Talakadu
