= Hemadryamba =

Tutelary deity of Bannur

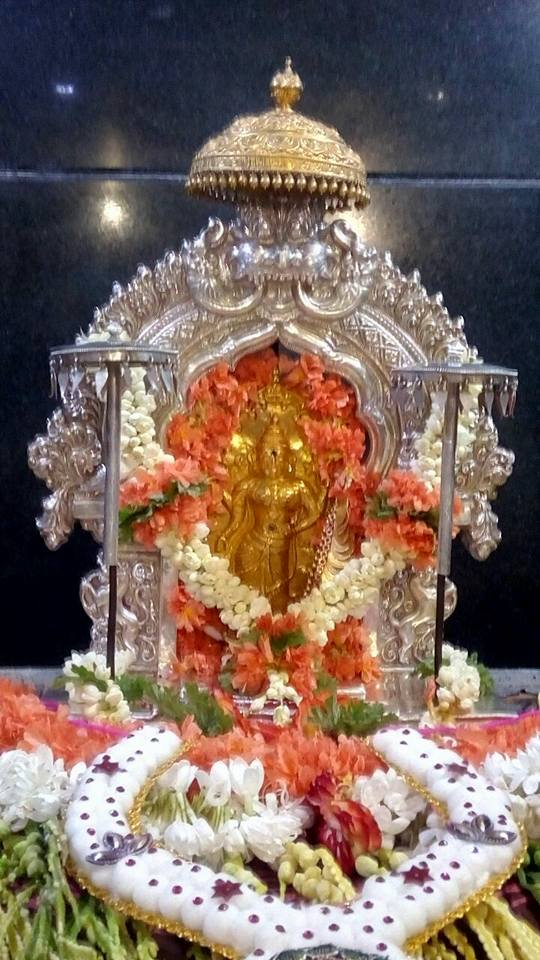
- Gender: Female

Hemadryambha ("hemadri" meaning gold and "amba" meaning mother) is the golden goddess regarded as the grāmadevatā of the Bannur municipal town region located next to the Kodanda Rama Deva temple. She is regarded as one of the Saptha Matrukas where the other forms of the goddess are associated with nearby districts.

== Description ==
The devi is regarded as the sri lalitha maha tripura sundari. The complete vision of the image of devi is a figure with four hands, where she has chakra in her upper left hand, a conch shell in her right hand, her lower right hand on the abhaya mudra, and lower left hand on the kati sthala. She has the sri chakra on her navel. She is standing in the natya bhangi.

== History ==
The goddess was worshipped by Sri vidyaranya, the twelfth jagadguru of the sringeri sharadha peetam during the time of the Vijayanagara empire. They performed rituals upon which the goddess was pleased by the devotion of the saints. There people witnessed golden rain; hence, she is also referred to as swarna vrushti pradayini. Later, on stages, the goddess was brought and worshipped in bannur. Previously this practice was called vahnipura, done at the time of magha masa (month of February), as well as jatramohotsava celebrated every year.
