= Adagoor, Tumkur =

Adagoor
- village
- Interactive map of Adagoor
- Coordinates: 13.3075°N 76.9837°E
- Country: India
- State: Karnataka
- District: Tumkur
- Talukas: Gubbi

Government
  - Body: Village Panchayat

Languages
  - Official: Kannada
- Time zone: UTC+5:30 (IST)
- Nearest city: Tumkur
- Civic agency: Village Panchayat

Adagoor (Gubbi) is a village in the southern state of Karnataka, India. It is located in the Gubbi taluk of Tumkur district.

== See also ==
- Tumkur
- Districts of Karnataka
