= Karighatta Road =

Coordinates: 12.421547°N 76.710829°E

Karighatta Road is the road connecting Srirangapatna town in Mandya district with the Bannur town in Mysore district, Karnataka state, India.

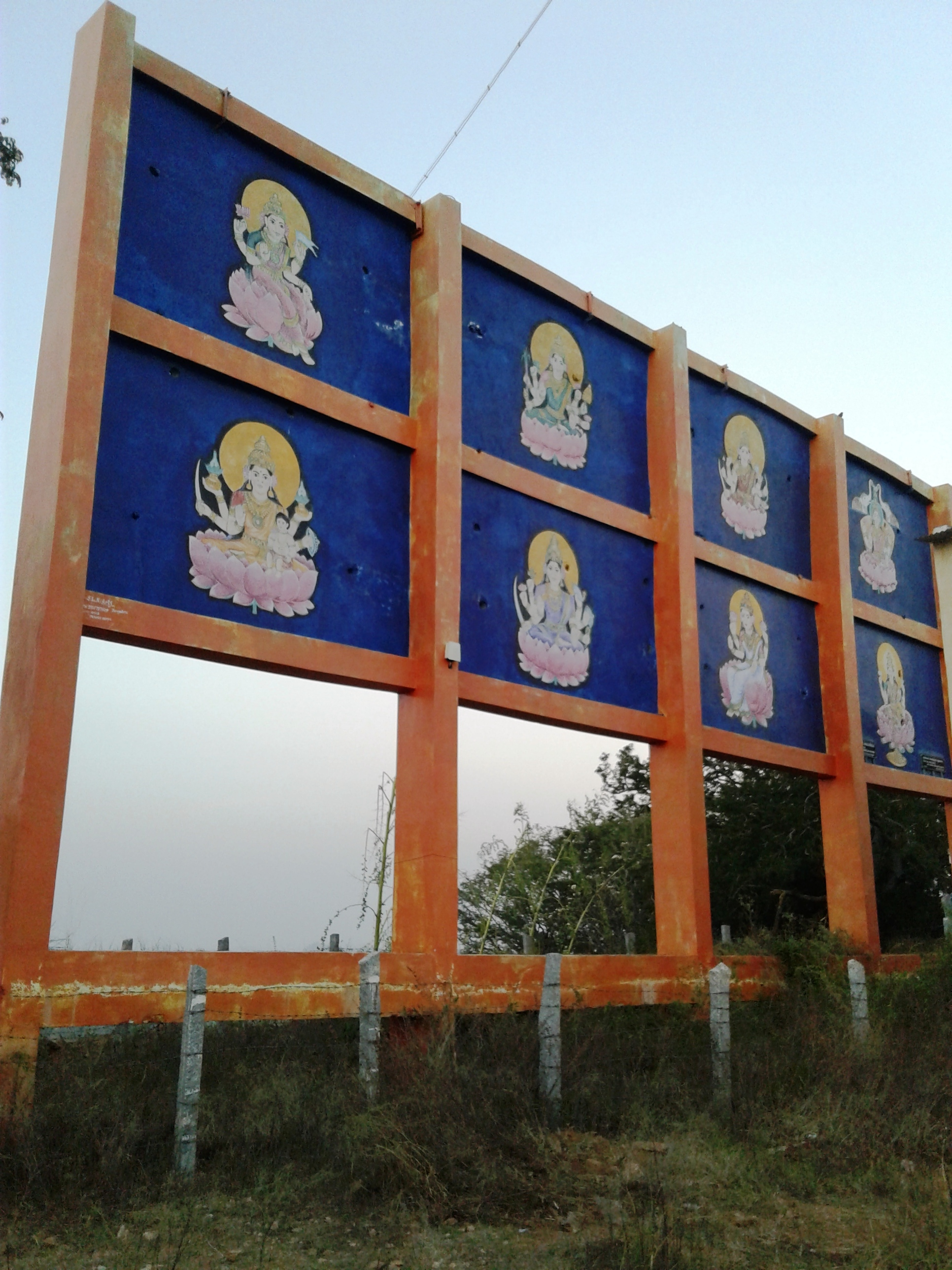
On top of Karighatta Hill

== Highlights ==
The Karighatta Road is also called Srirangapatna-Bannur Road. In Bannur, this road is called S.R.P.Road. The entire stretch of the road goes by the northern side of the Cauvery River.

== Image gallery ==
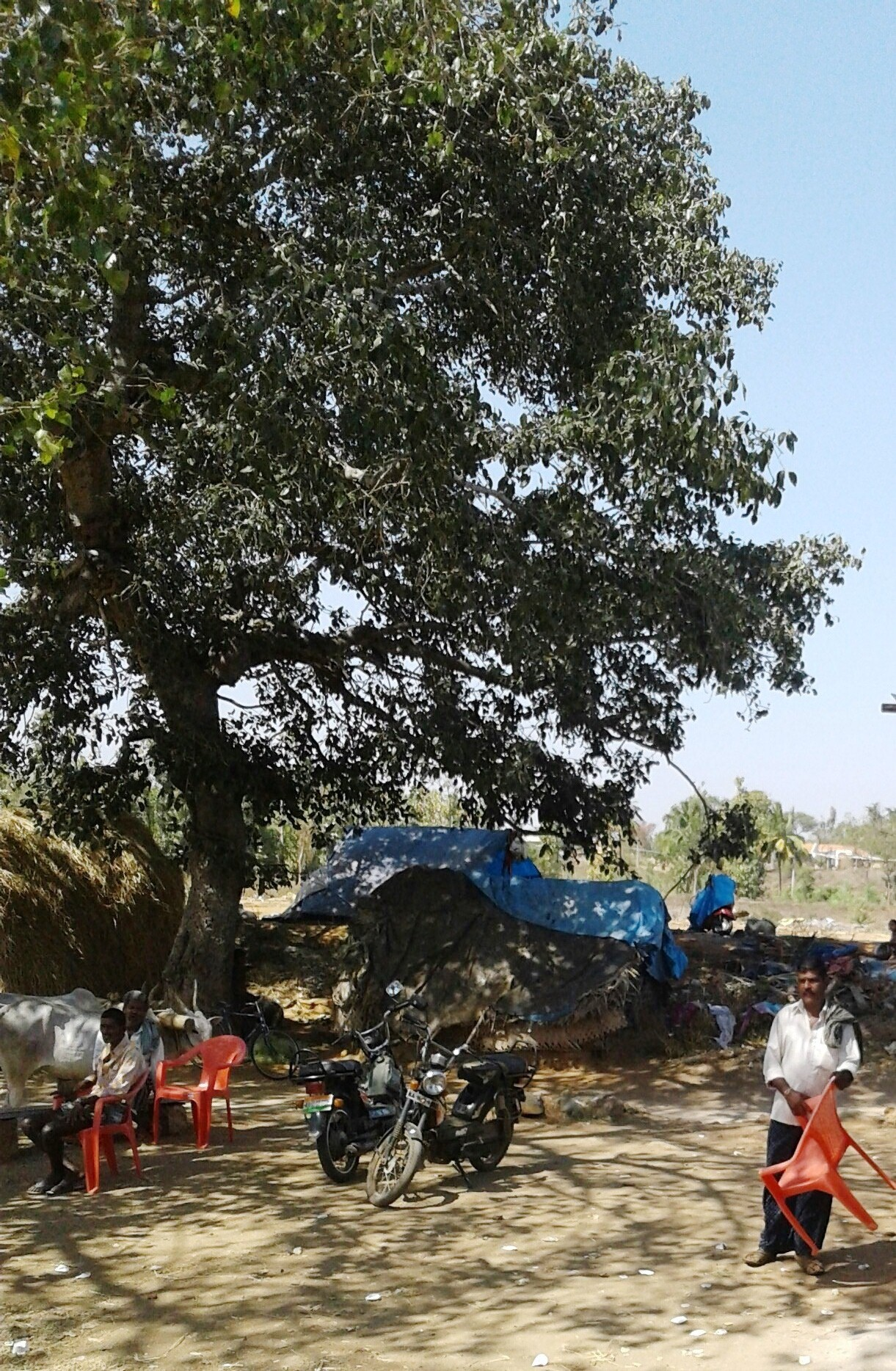
Mellagala

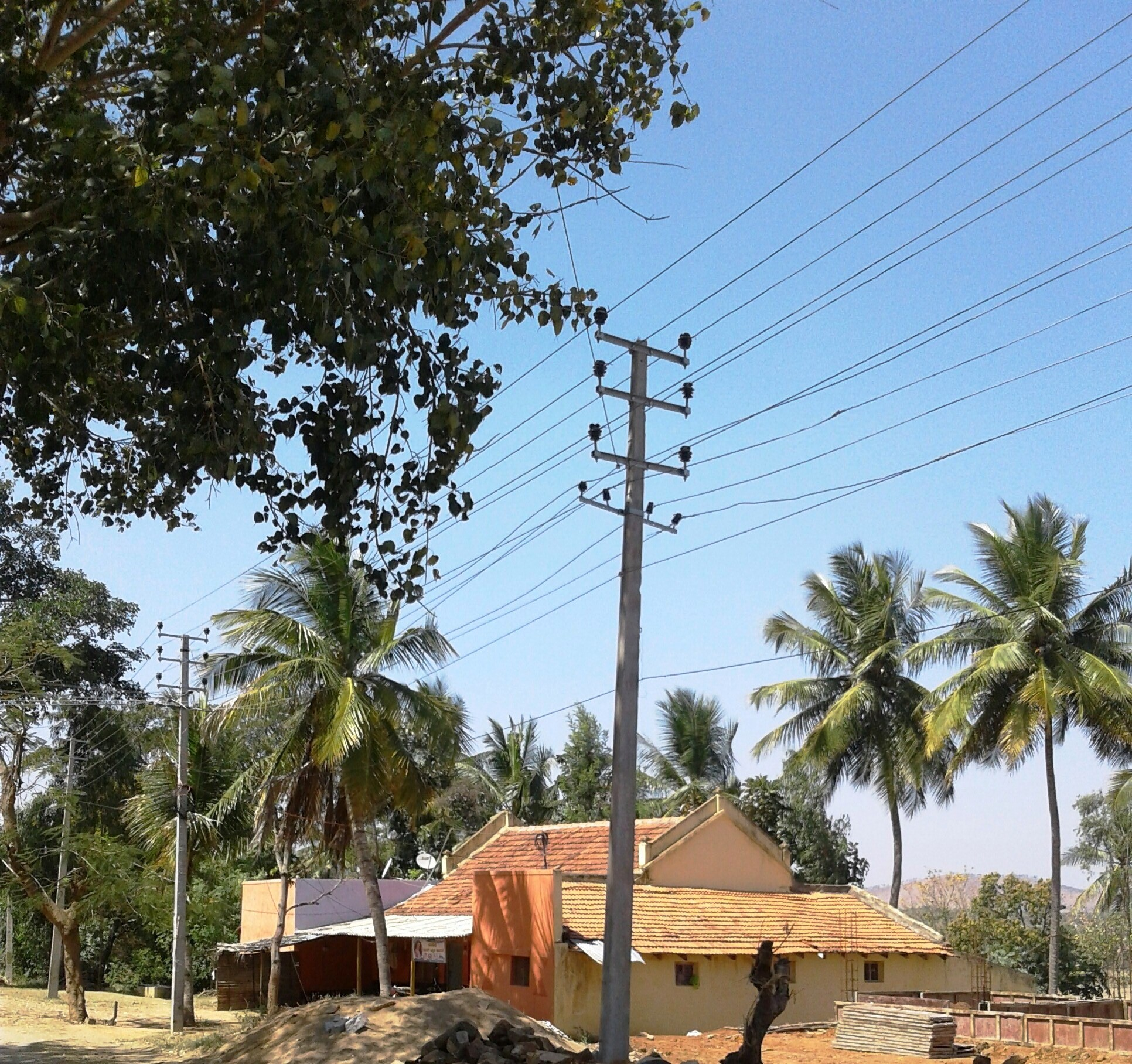
Hosalli

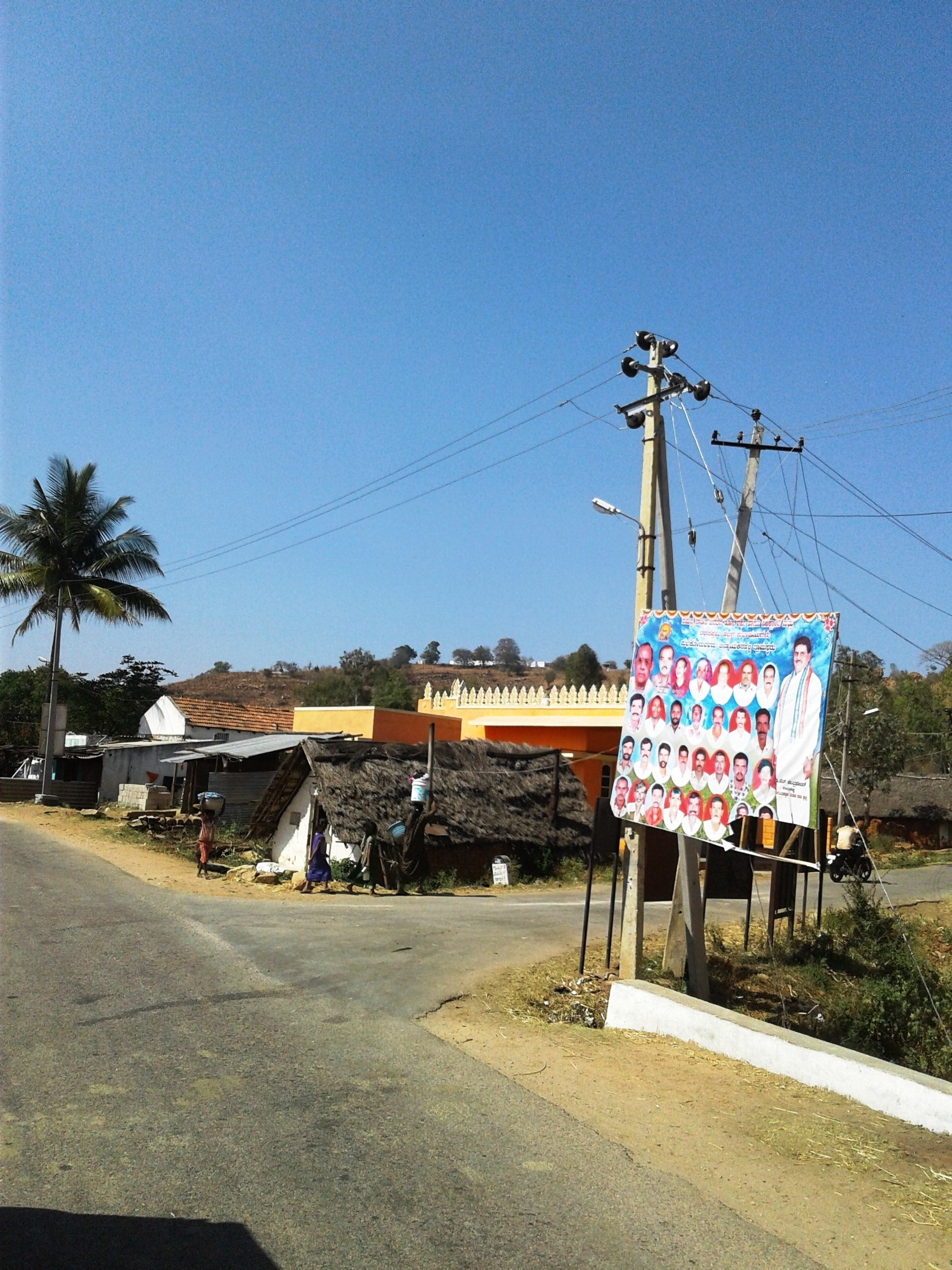
Chinnathuhalli

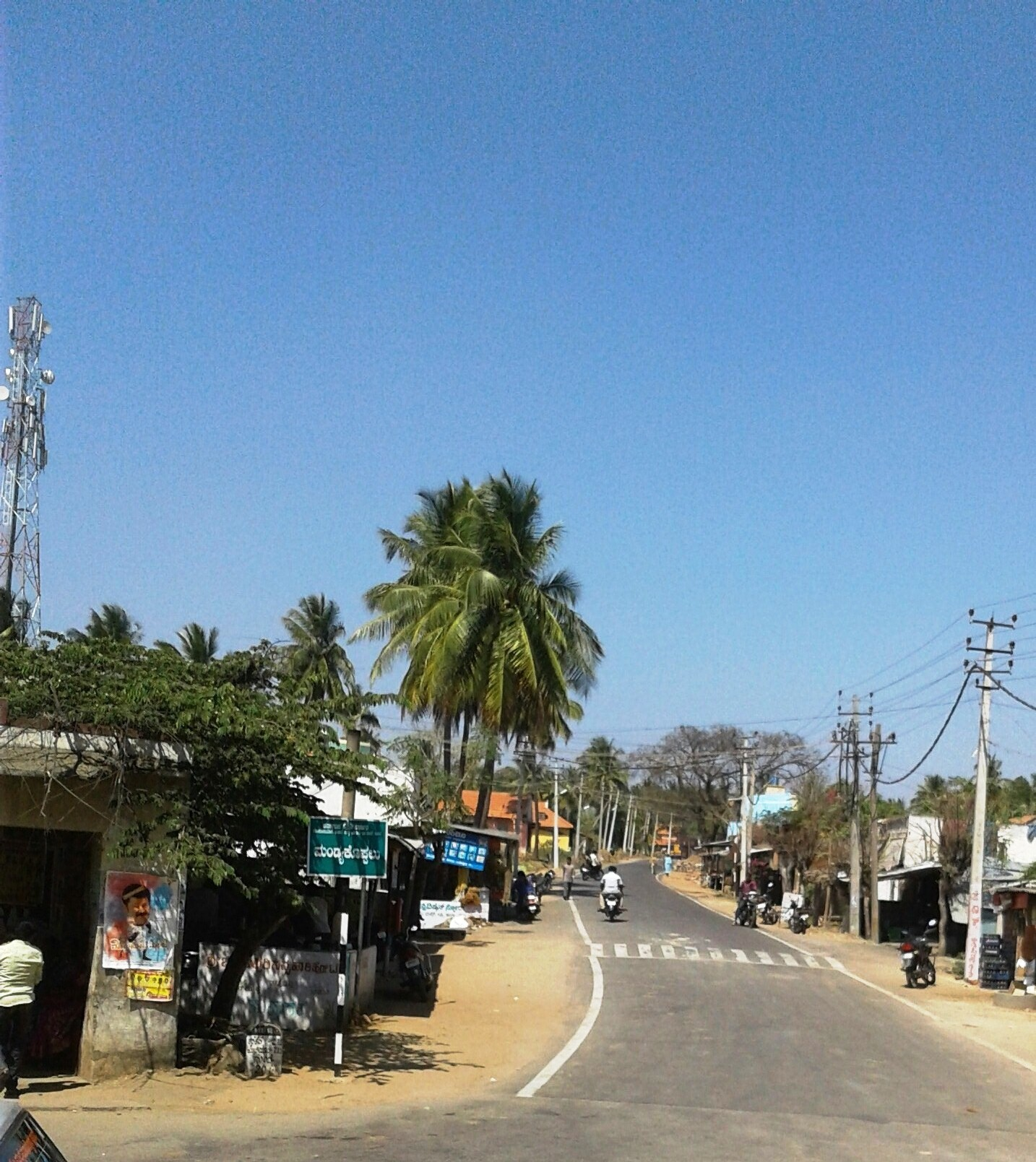
Mandyakoppalu

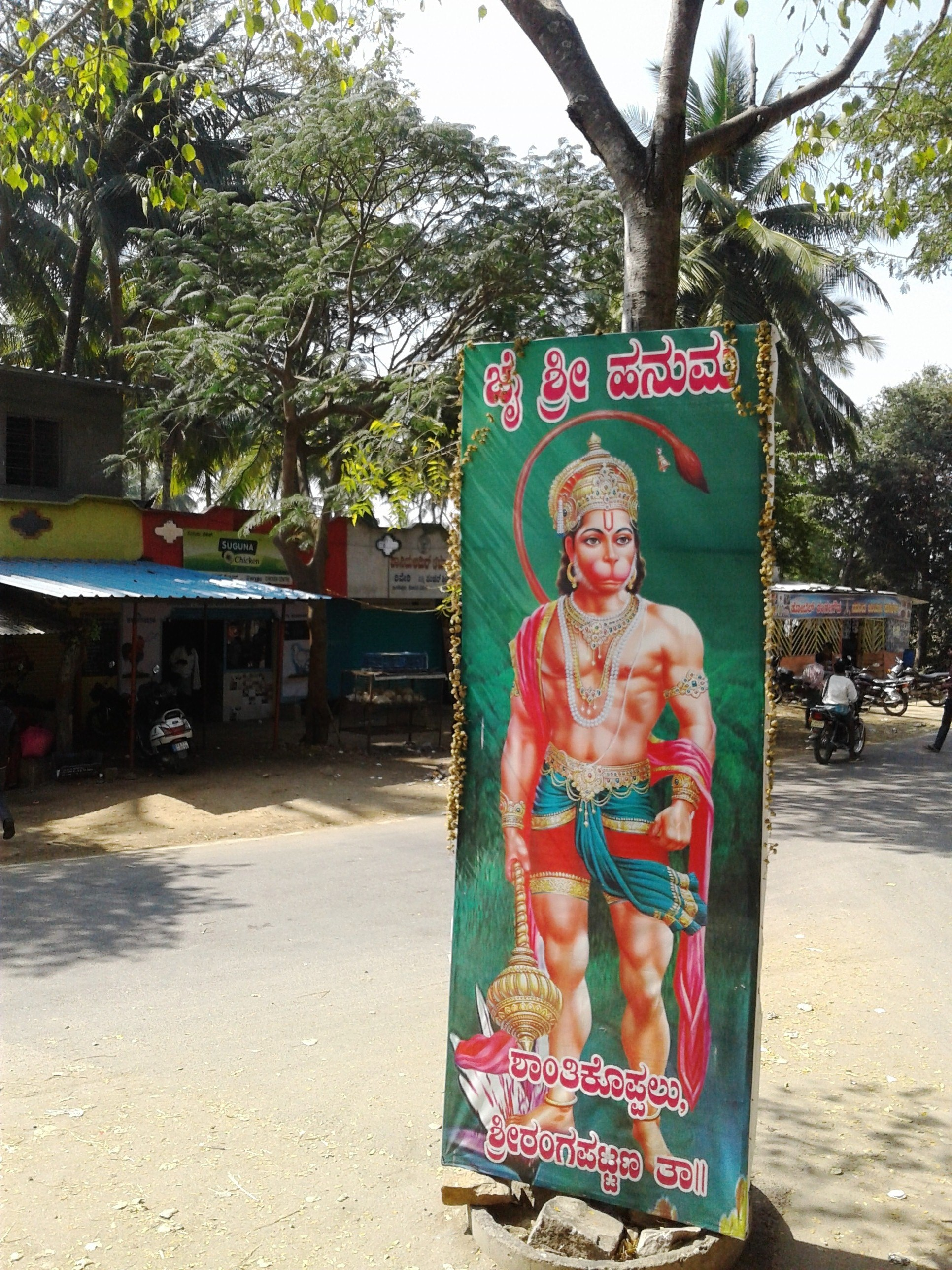
Shanthikoppal

== See also ==
- Bannur
- Srirangapatna
- Karighatta Temple
