= Bannur =

- Town
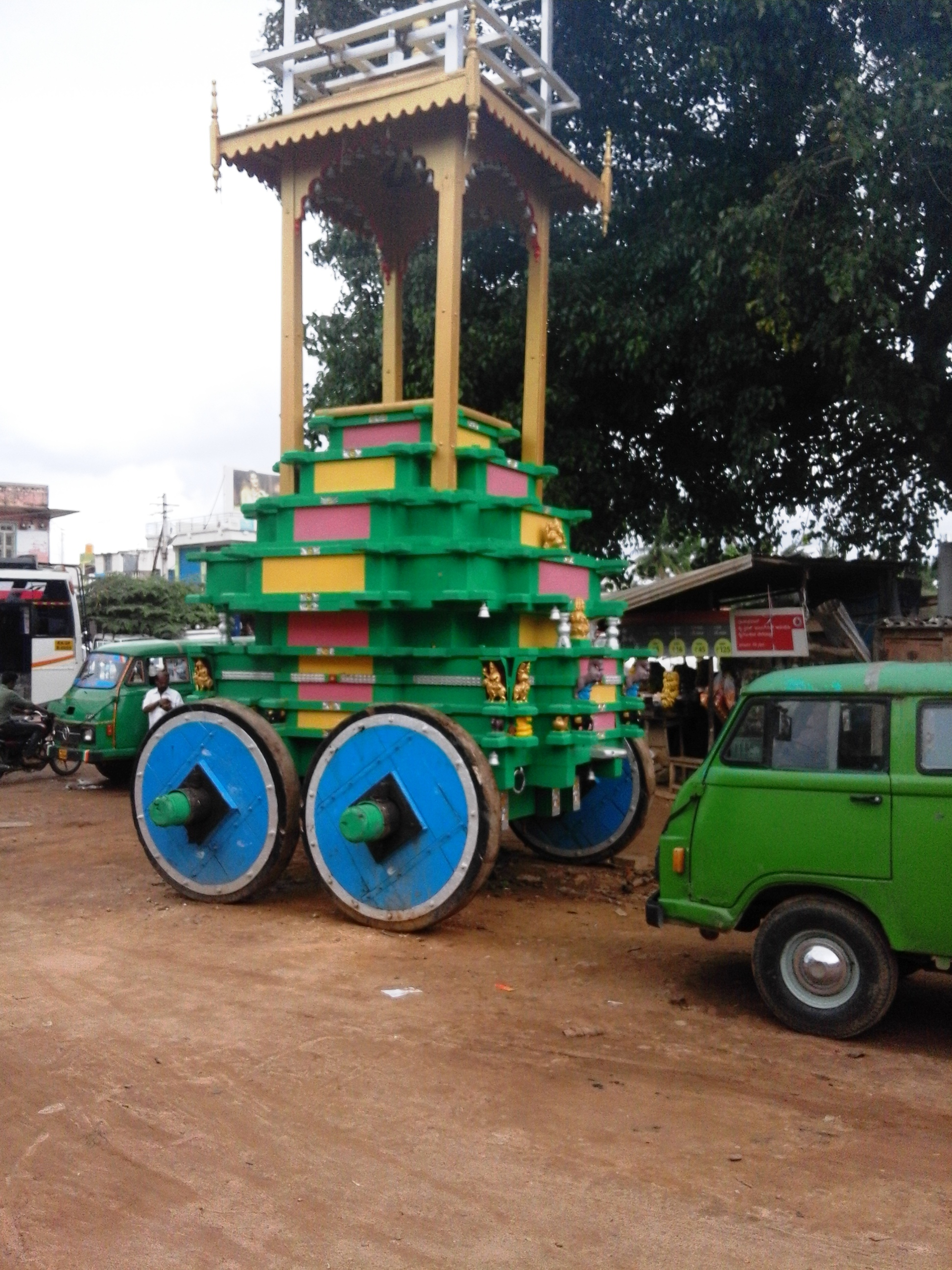
- Hindu Temple Chariot
- Interactive map of Bannur
- Coordinates: 12.2548°N 76.9070°E
- Country: India
- State: Karnataka
- District: Mysore

Government
  - Type: Municipality
- Elevation: 654 m (2,146 ft)

Population (2011)
  - Total: 21,896

Language
  - Official: ಕನ್ನಡ (Kannada)
- Time zone: UTC+5:30 (IST)
- PIN: 571101
- ISO 3166 code: IN-KA
- Vehicle registration: KA-09, KA-55
- Website: karnataka.gov.in bannurtown.mrc.gov.in

Bannur or Bannooru is a municipality in T.Narasipura Taluk, Mysore district in the state of Karnataka, India. It is located at 12.33°N 76.86°E. It has an average elevation of 654 metres (2,146 ft) T.Narasipura Taluk Near Somanathapur Temple. It is about 25 kilometers from the city of Mysuru and around 30 kilometres (19 mi)30 kilometers from Mandya

== History ==
This place was known as Banniyur, Vanniyur, Vahinipura, Varniyur. It is known that Sripurusha in the 8th century during the rule of Ganga made this as his capital. It is the birthplace of Vyasaraya, a scholar of Dvaita Siddhanta.

== Bannur temple ==
Bannur temple is located right opposite to the bus station. The temple is dedicated to devi Hemadryamba. The temple car is decorated during festival times and dragged along the town in a procession of musicians and dancers. Thousands of people takes part in this festival which is conducted in February every year

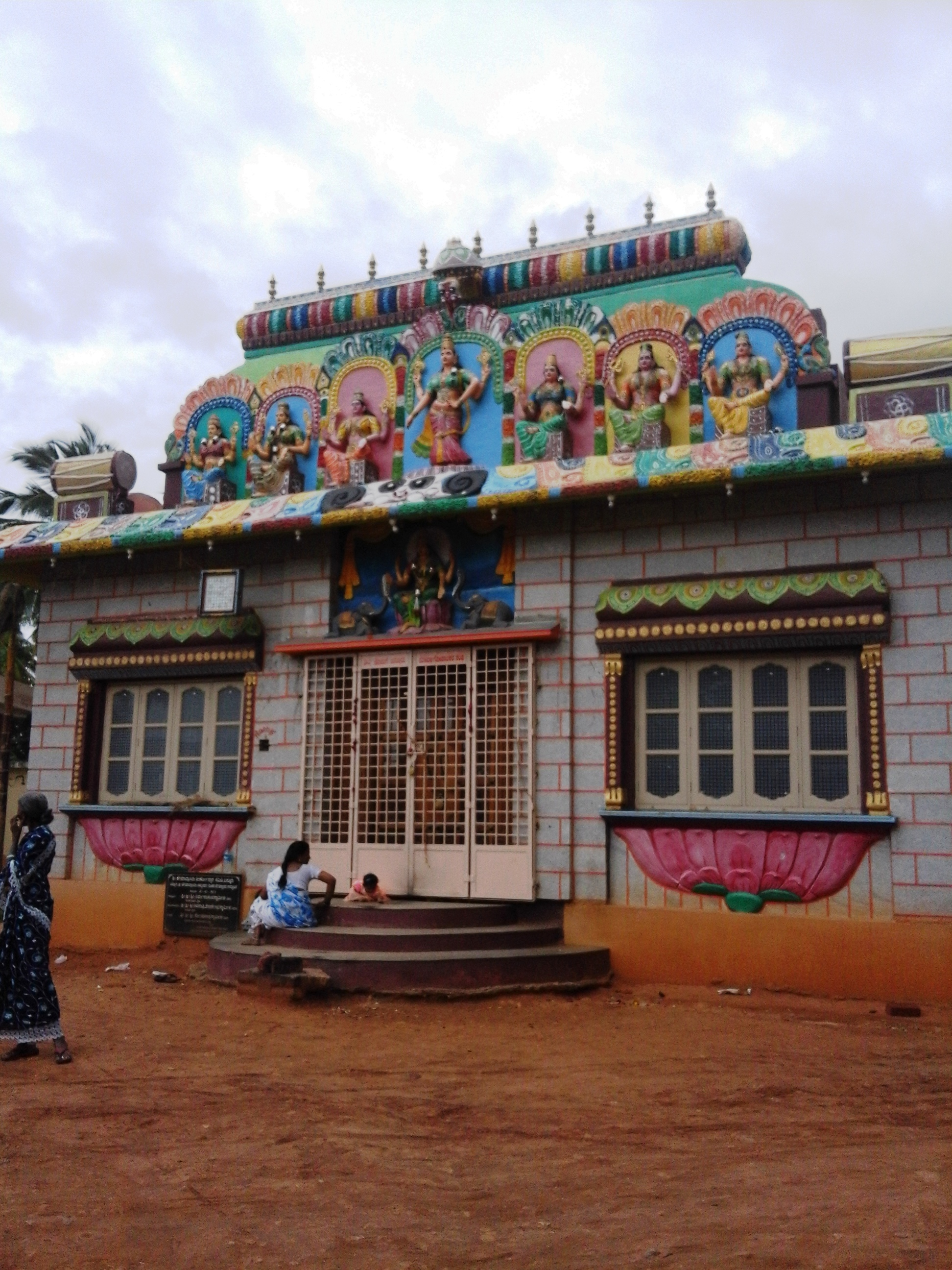

== Bannur Sheep ==
Bannur Sheep is an indigenous breed of sheep known for its excellent quality of meat and wool. The meat of this sheep is a delicacy in Karnataka, especially in traditional dishes during festivals and special occasions. The breed has been in existence for over 500 years and has been selectively bred by local farmers to suit the environmental conditions of the region. It is highly valued for its adaptability, resistance to diseases, and low maintenance requirements.

Bannur sheep are medium-sized animals, with mature rams (males) weighing between 45 and 55 kg and mature ewes (females) weighing between 35 and 45 kg. The breed has a distinctive appearance, with a long, narrow head, long ears, and a slightly curved nose. Bannur sheep have a white or light brown coat, with a wool density of 1.5 to 2.5 kg per sheep.

Sheep farming is integrated with agriculture in the region, where farmers utilize the sheep for grazing on fallow lands and crop residues, enhancing soil fertility with their manure.

== Demographics ==
As of the 2011 census, Bannur Town Municipal Council has a population of 21,896 of which 10,849 are males while 11,047 are females as per report released by Census India 2011.

The population of children aged 0-6 is 2366 which is 10.81% of total population of Bannur (TMC). In Bannur Town Municipal Council, the female sex ratio is of 1018 against state average of 973. Moreover, the child sex ratio in Bannur is around 1040 compared to Karnataka state average of 948. The literacy rate of Bannur city is 70.75% lower than state average of 75.36%. In Bannur, male literacy is around 74.85%, while the female literacy rate is 66.72%.

The Bannur Town Municipal Council has total administration over 5,186 houses to which it supplies basic amenities like water and sewerage. It is also authorized to build roads within Town Municipal Council limits and impose taxes on properties coming under its jurisdiction.

Religions in Bannur CMC (2011)
Religion	Percent
Hinduism	78.94%
Islam	20.67%
Other or not stated	0.39%
Distribution of religions

Languages of Bannur Town (2011)
1. Kannada (74.0%)
2. Urdu (20.5%)
3. Telugu (3.27%)
4. Others (2.21%)

== Image gallery ==
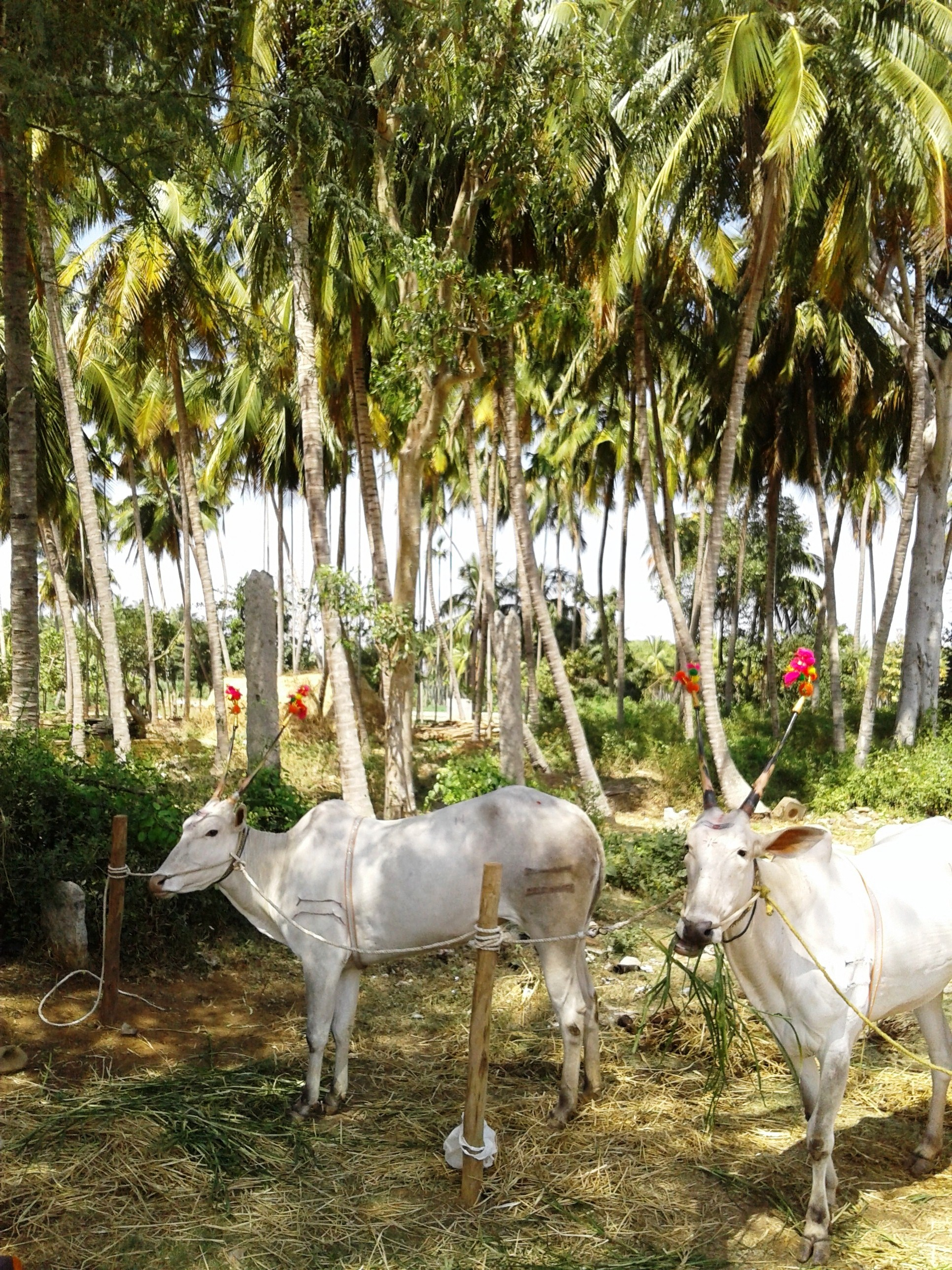
Coconut Farm

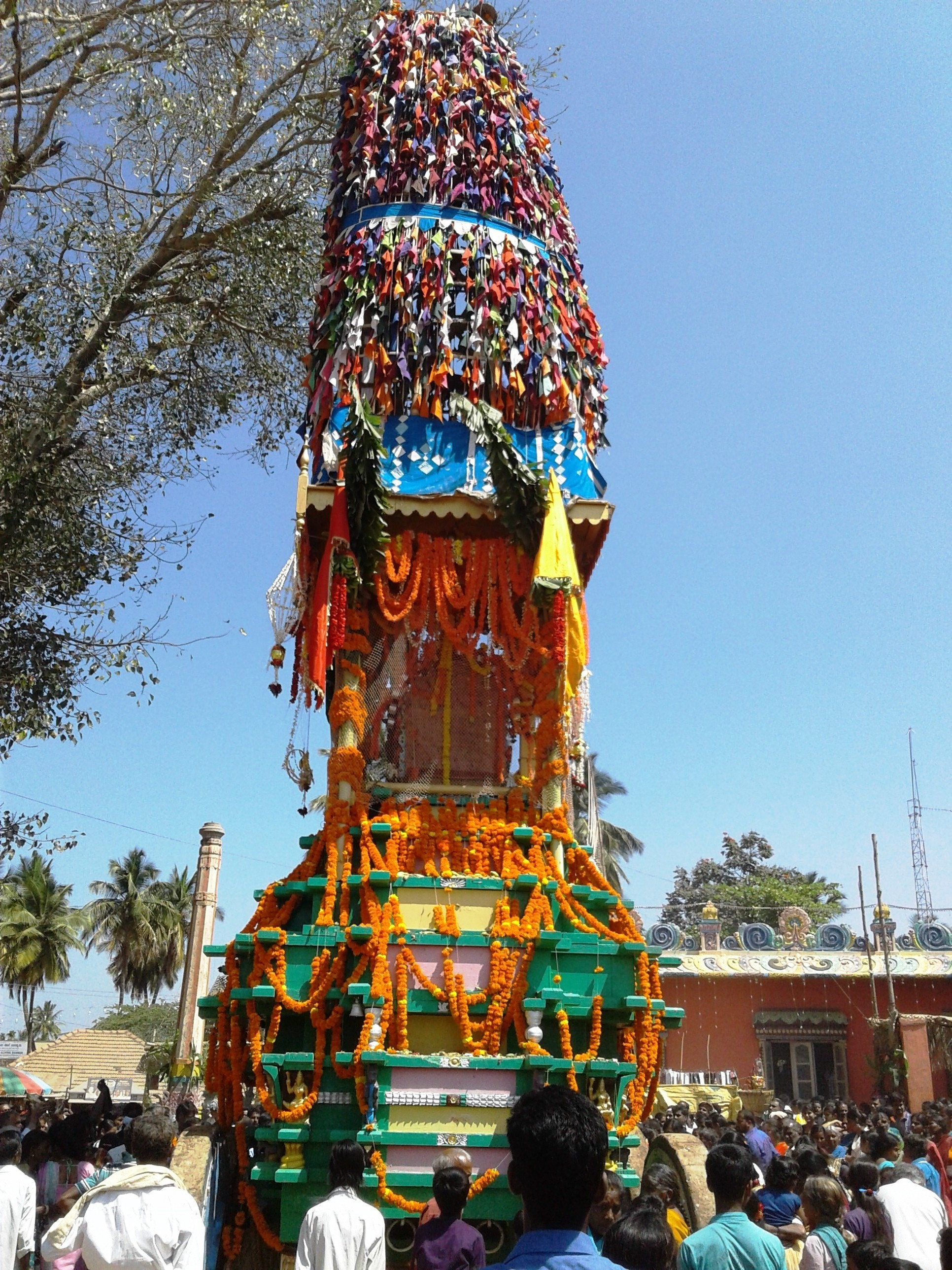
Decorated temple car

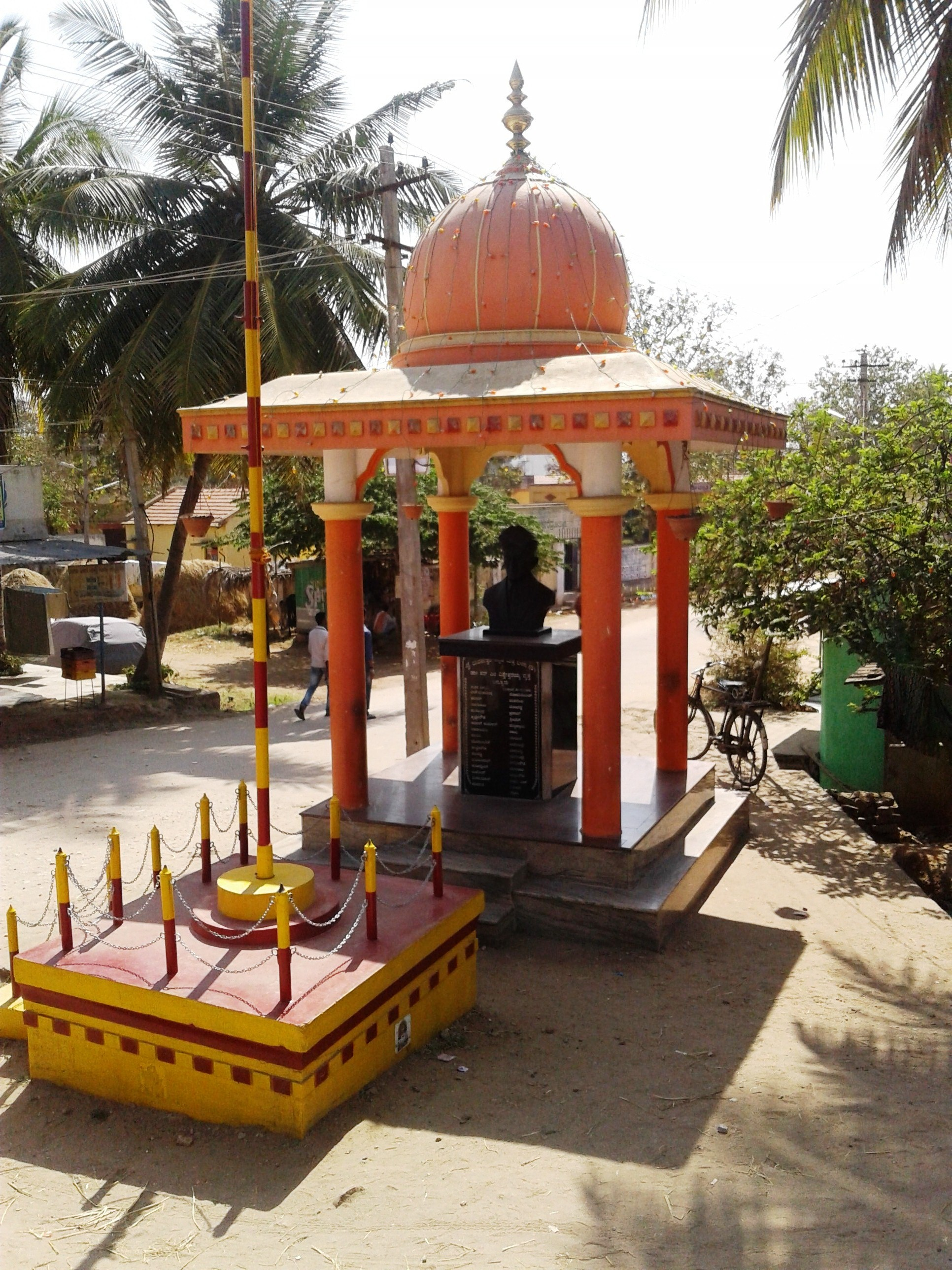
SRP Road

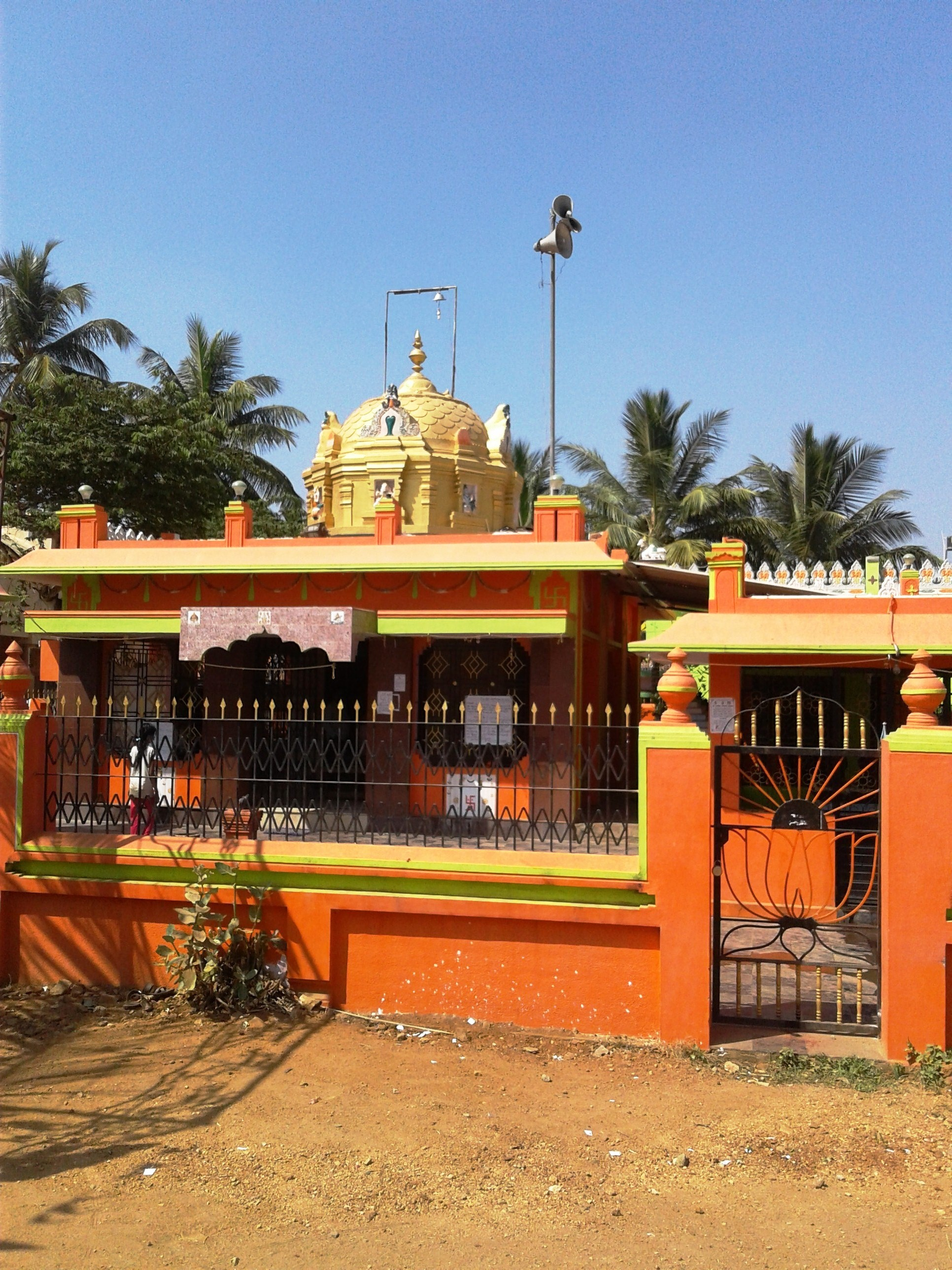
Ganesh Temple

== See also ==
- Yachenahalli
- Srirangapatna
- Arakere
- Karighatta Road
- Kodagahalli
- Somanathapura
- Beedanahalli
- Mahadevapura
