= Arakere, Shrirangapattana =

Arakere
- village
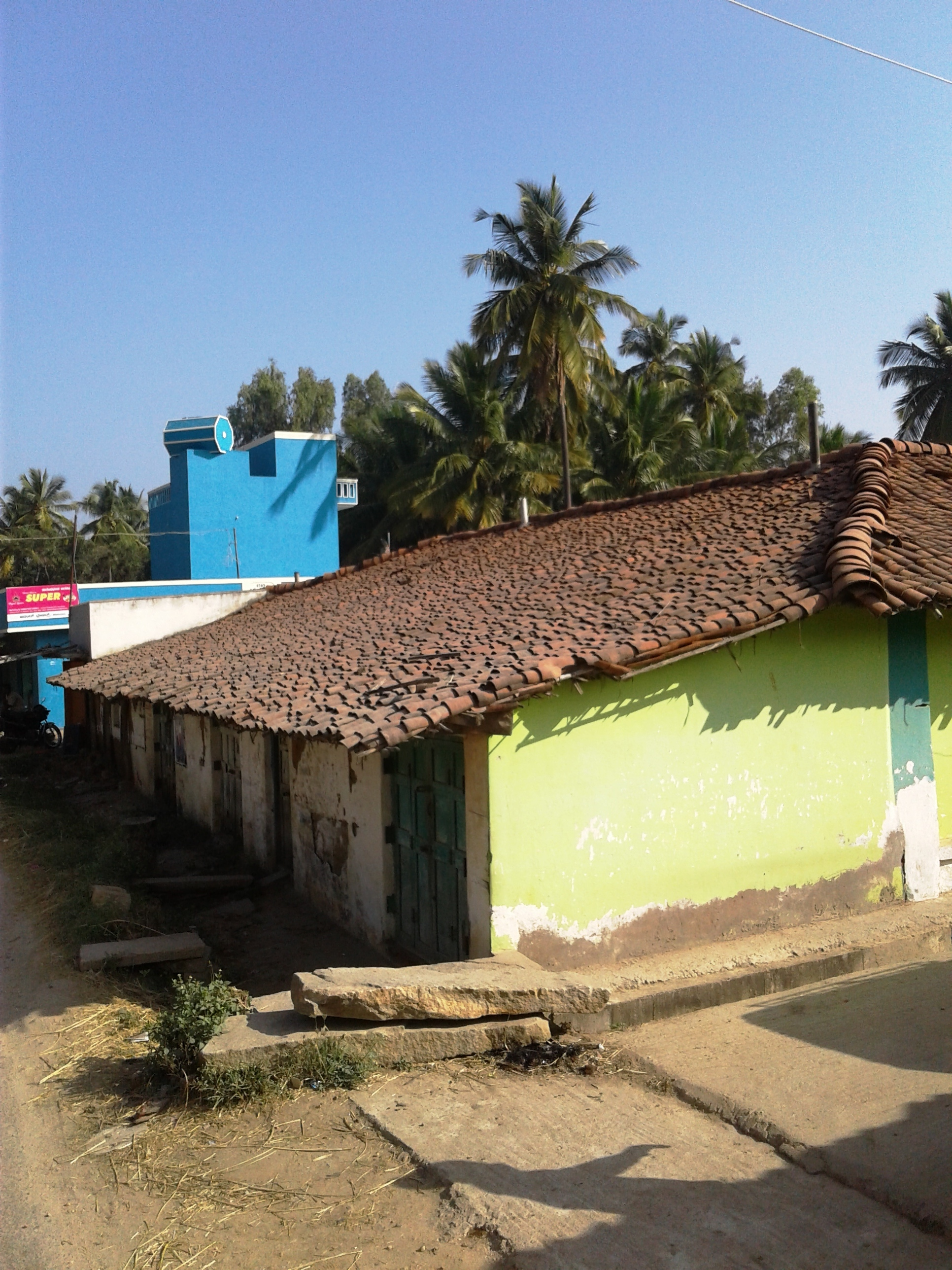
- Arakere
- Country: India
- State: Karnataka
- District: Mandya
- Talukas: Shrirangapattana

Government
  - Body: Gram panchayat

Population (2015)
  - Total: 16,000

Languages
  - Official: Kannada
- Time zone: UTC+5:30 (IST)
- ISO 3166 code: IN-KA
- Vehicle registration: KA
- Website: karnataka.gov.in

Arakere is a village in the southern state of Karnataka, India. It is located in the Shrirangapattana taluk of Mandya district in Karnataka.

== Demographics ==
As of the 2001 India census, Arakere had a population of 9,708 with 4,811 males and 4,897 females.

== Post office ==
There is a post office at Arakere; the postal code is 571415.

== Landmarks ==
- Maraleshwara Temple
- Chennakeshava Temple
- Bisilumaramma Temple
- Arakere Hobli
- Yoganarashima Temple
- Bisilu Maramma festival
- Govt Poytechnic

== See also ==
- Mandya
- Districts of Karnataka
