= Periyapatna =

Periyapatna Singapatna
- Town
- Piriyapatna
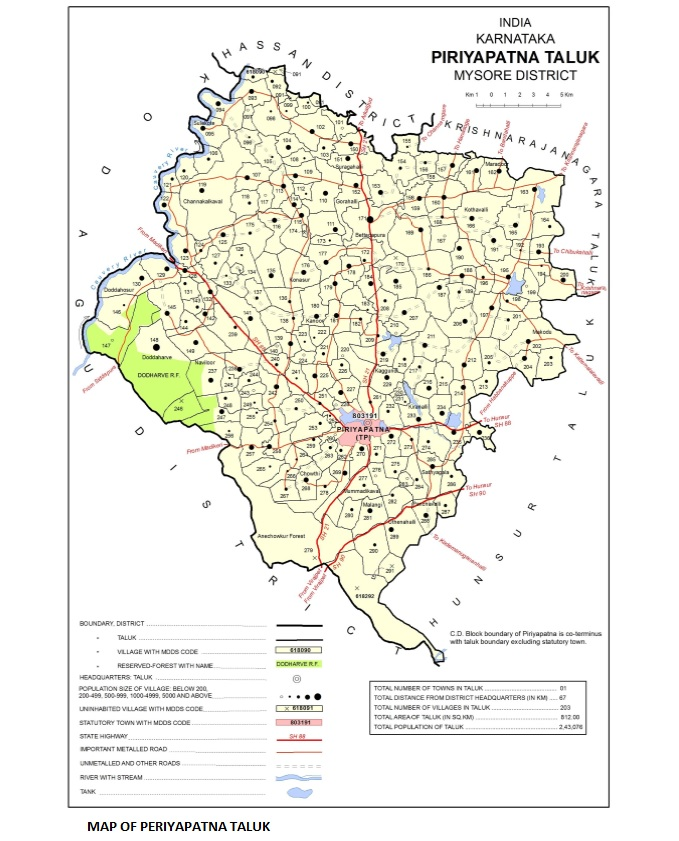
- Periyapatna Taluk Map

- Location in Karnataka, India
- Coordinates: 12.33649°N 76.07918°E
- Country: India
- State: Karnataka
- District: Mysuru
- Founder: Periya Raja
- Named for: Periya Raja

Government
  - Type: Town Municipal Council
  - Body: Periyapatna Town Municipal Council

Area
  - Town: 12.5 km^{2} (4.8 sq mi)
  - Rural: 808.20 km^{2} (312.05 sq mi)
- Elevation: 852 m (2,795 ft)

Population (2011)
  - Town: 16,685
  - Density: 1,330/km^{2} (3,460/sq mi)
  - Rural: 226,391

Languages
  - Official: Kannada
- Time zone: UTC+5:30 (IST)
- PIN: 571107
- Telephone code: 08223
- Vehicle registration: KA-45
- Nearest cities: Kushalanagara, Mysore
- Climate: Tropical wet and dry (Köppen)

Periyapatna, also known as Piriyāpattana, is a town and taluk in Mysore district, Karnataka.

== Location ==
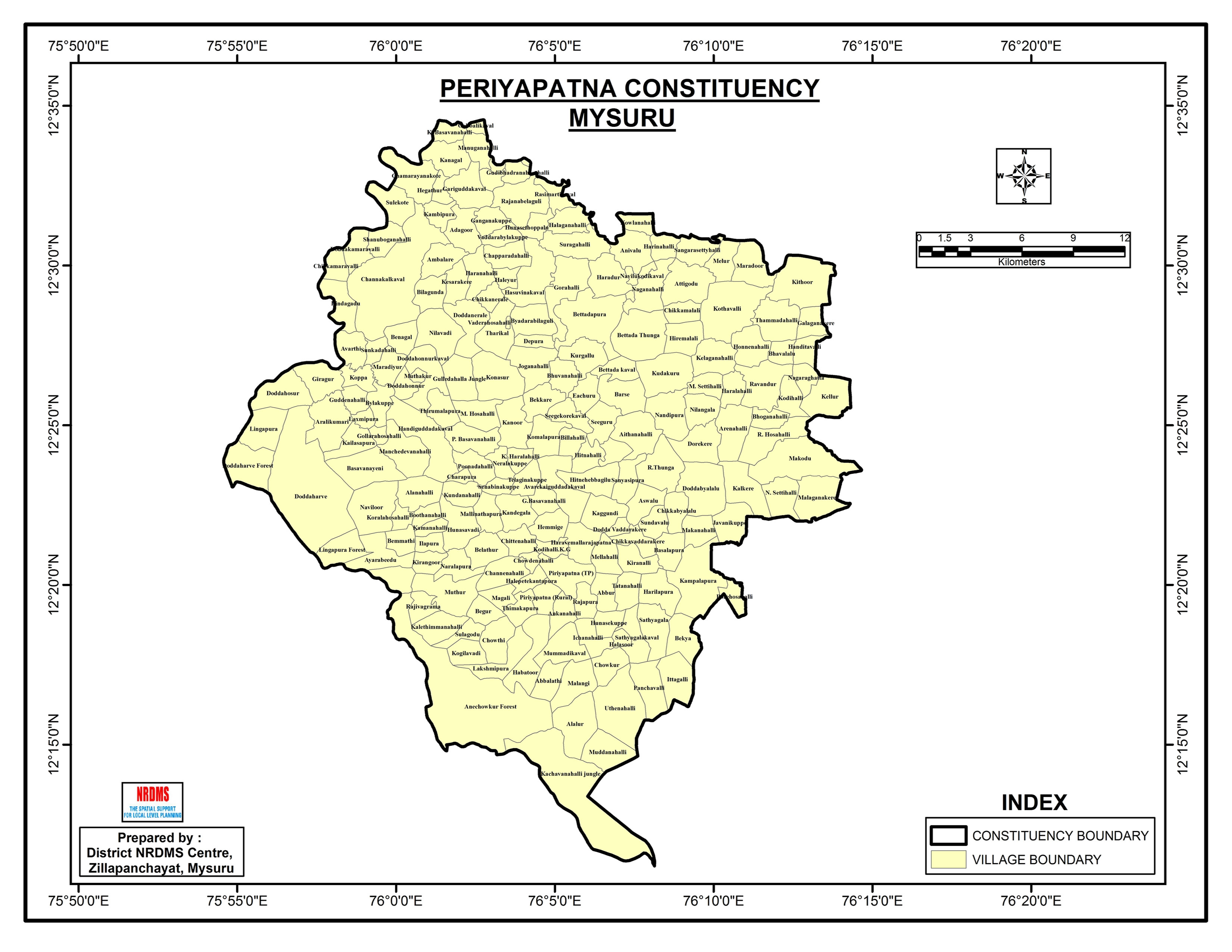
Periyapatna Vidhana Sabha Constituency marks the boundary of Periyapatna Taluk

Periyapatna is located at 12.34°N 76.1°E. It has an average elevation of 852 metres (2,795 ft) above mean-sea-level. The town is situated on Bengaluru-Mysuru-Mangaluru Highway 70 km from Mysuru. The town is nearby Kushalanagar in Kodagu district.

Bylakuppe Town Periyapatna Taluk Karnataka is the world’s second-largest Tibetan settlement (Dharamsala in Himachal Pradesh is the largest)

In the 1960s, when China invaded Tibet many Tibetan refugees sought shelter in India and their leader, the Dalai Lama, requested that the Indian government to provide a place for them in India.

The then Karnataka Chief Minister, S Nijalingappa, allocated 3,000 acres of land in the Mysuru district’s Bylakuppe town.

Today, more than 20,000 Tibetans live there.

== Rehabilitation ==
A scheme has been sanctioned for the resettlement of Tibetan displaced persons in Periyapatna Taluk under Tibetan Refuges Rehabilitation Scheme (TRR Scheme) office building situated at Bylakuppe now it is Panchayat Office, as distinct from Periyapatna town. Central School for Tibetans was also run by the Government of India. Around 800 agriculturist families have settled there. It will cost about this Rs 4,000 per family. The cost of the entire scheme is borne by the Central Government. The state government for the moment has offered about 8,000 acres of land, and we are told that the area is covered with forests. Six acres of land will be given to each family and according to the State Government, it will be quite sufficient for any agriculturist family. The scheme has been dropped.

== Places of interest ==
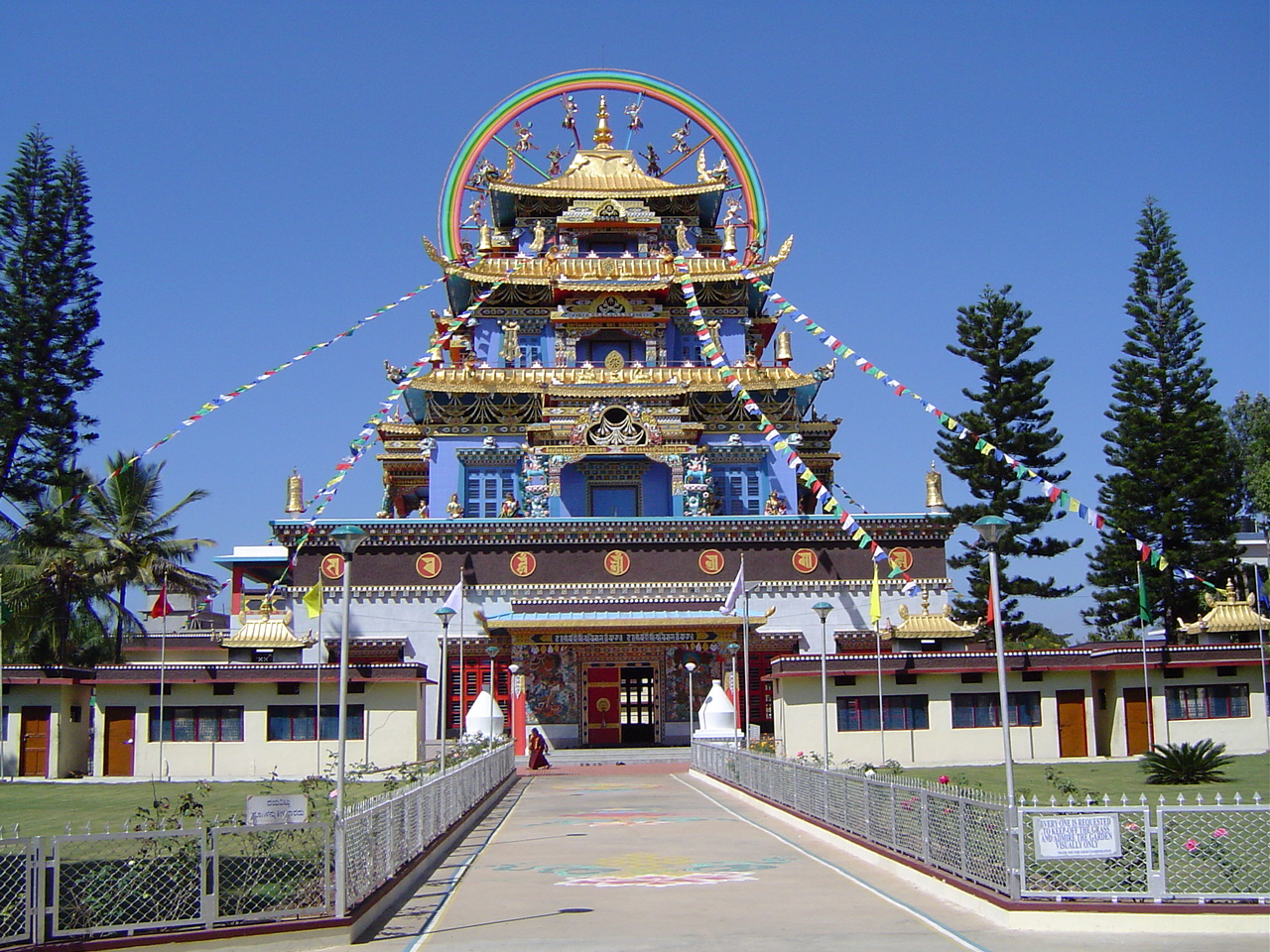

The Kannambadi Amma and Masanikamma temples in Periyapatna are frequented by the villagers.

The temple of Aprameya was built in the 11th century by Chola emperor Rajendra Simha. The temple is named after the invading Chola general Aprameya. The idol of Ambegalu Navaneetha Krishna (crawling Krishna with butter in hand), is believed to be the only deity of Lord Sri Krishna in this pose. This idol was installed by Vyasaraja (aka Vyasatirtha), who was a prominent saint of Dvaita Vedanta. The famous Kriti (musical composition or song) "Jagadodharana Adisidale Yashode" was composed by most prominent composer of Carnatic music Purandaradasa in appreciation of the beauty of this idol.

Bylakuppe Tibetan settlement is located in this taluk.

== Demographics ==
Religions in Periyapatna Taluk
Religion	Percent
Hinduism	87.17%
Islam	6.81%
Buddhism	5.22%
Other or not stated	0.80%

As per the 2011 census, there were a total 4,031 families living in Piriyapatna city. Piriyapatna has a total population of 16,685, comprising 8,284 males and 8,401 females - equating to an average sex ratio of 1,014 females per 1,000 males.

There are 1,851 children aged 0–6 years in Piriyapatna city, which is 11% of the total population. There are 946 male children and 905 female children between the age 0–6 years. Thus as per the 2011 census the Child Sex Ratio of Piriyapatna is 957 which is less than average sex ratio (1,014).

As per the 2011 census, the literacy rate of Piriyapatna is 80.8%. Thus it has a higher literacy rate than the Mysore district's rate of 72.8%. The male literacy rate is 86.56% and the female literacy rate is 75.27% in Piriyapatna.

Languages spoken in Piriyapatna Taluk
1. Kannada (83.7%)
2. Urdu (6.17%)
3. Tibetan (4.34%)
4. Telugu (1.73%)
5. Tamil (1.18%)
6. Malayalam (0.76%)
7. Others (2.08%)

The Vokkaliga Gowda community has the highest population of the Taluk and many people cultivate tobacco. It is also the homeland for the Majority of Minor Tribal group Beda Nayakas (ST-Hunting tribal groups..also called as Valmiki Nayakas) vowing to thick Malanad forest around and Hunting being their occupation. As of 2001 India census,

== Gallery ==
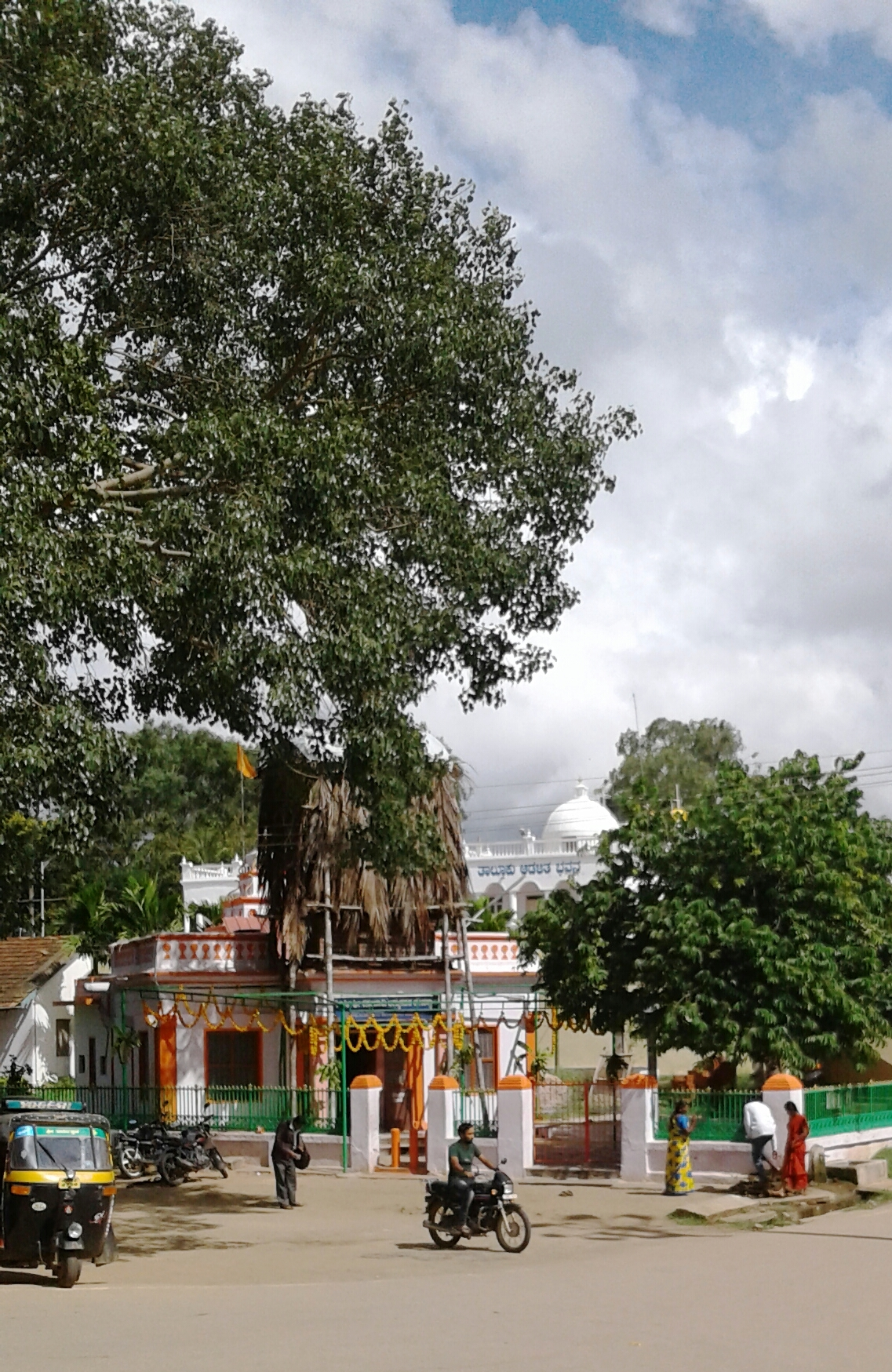

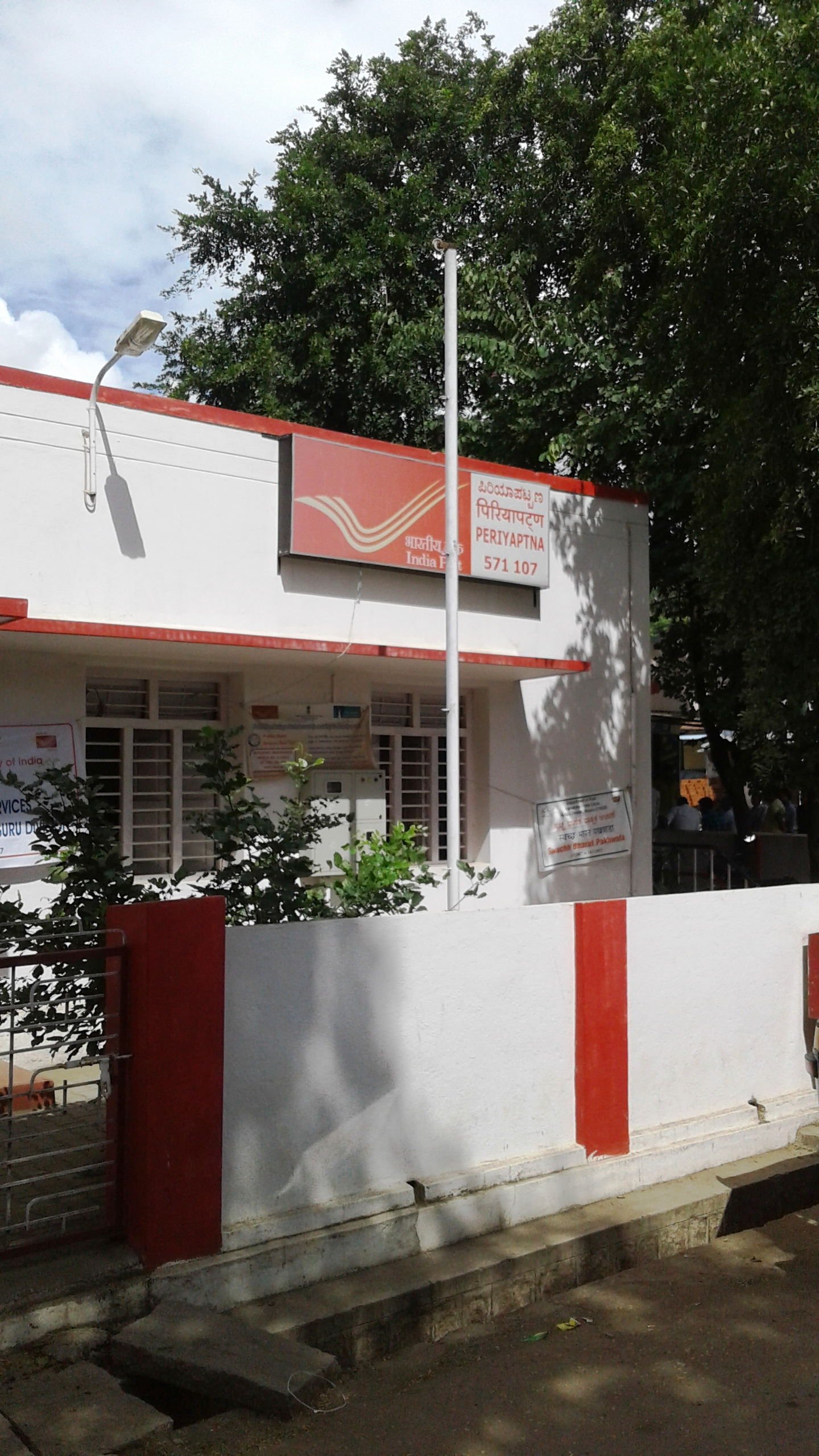

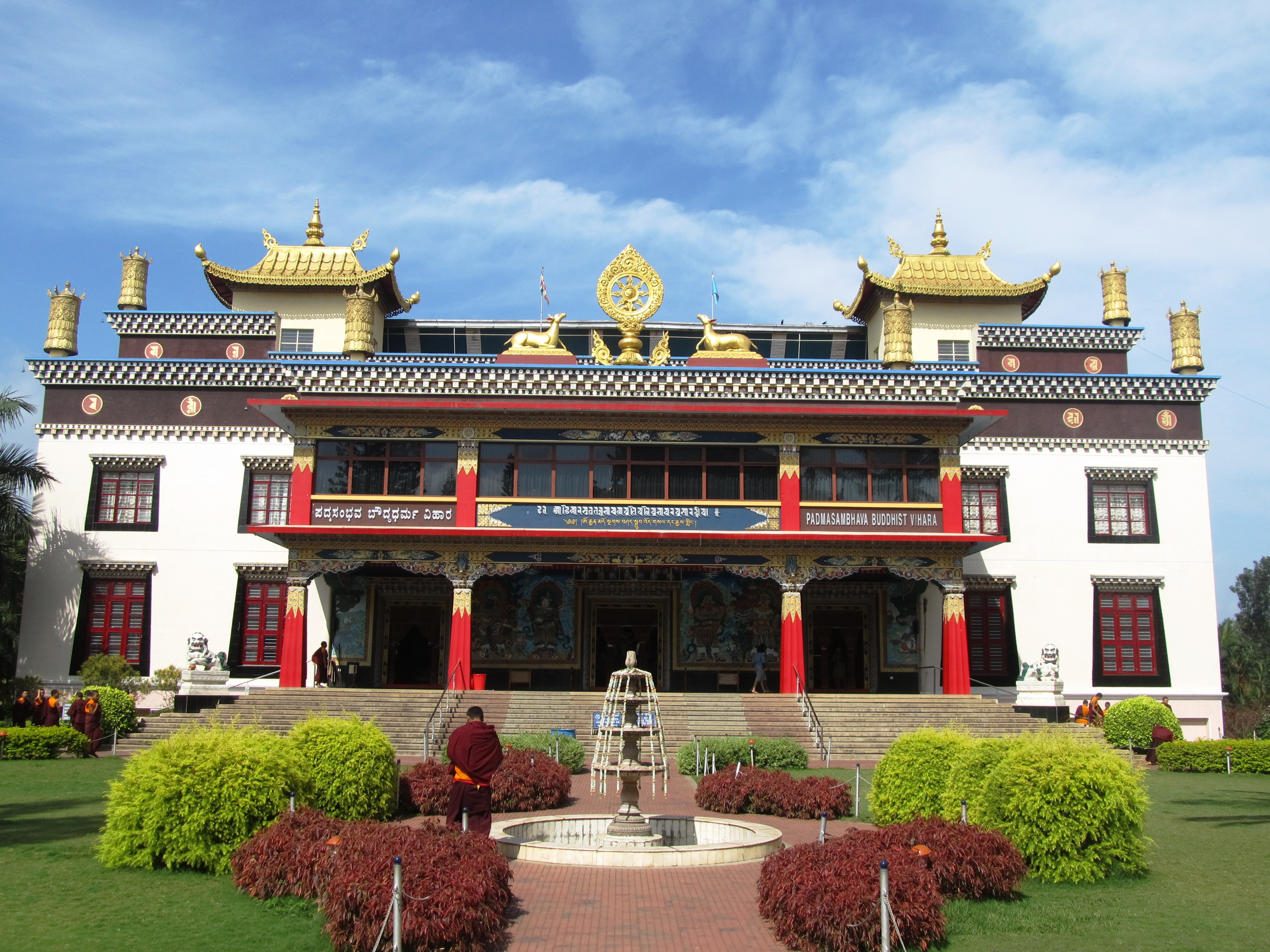

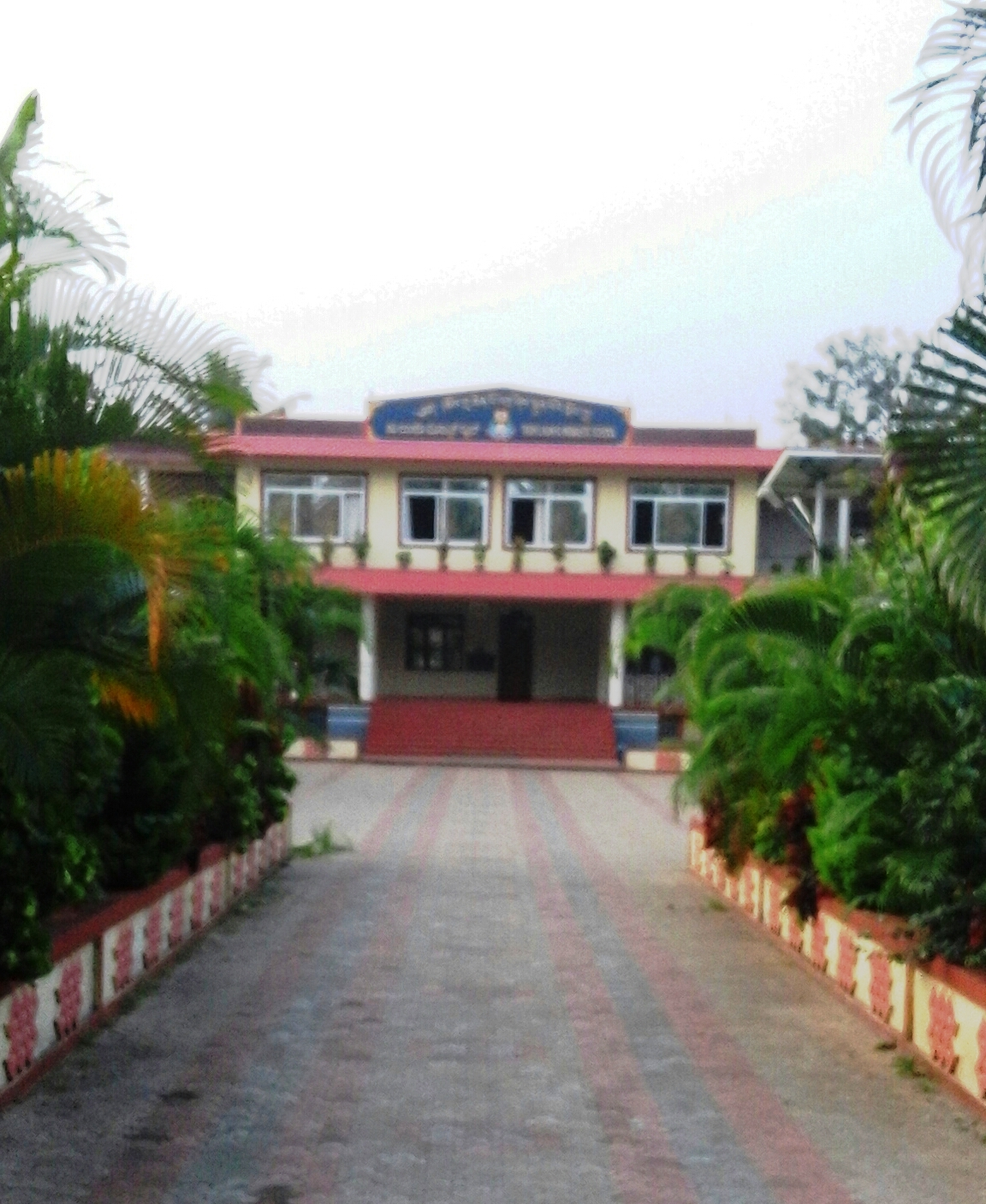

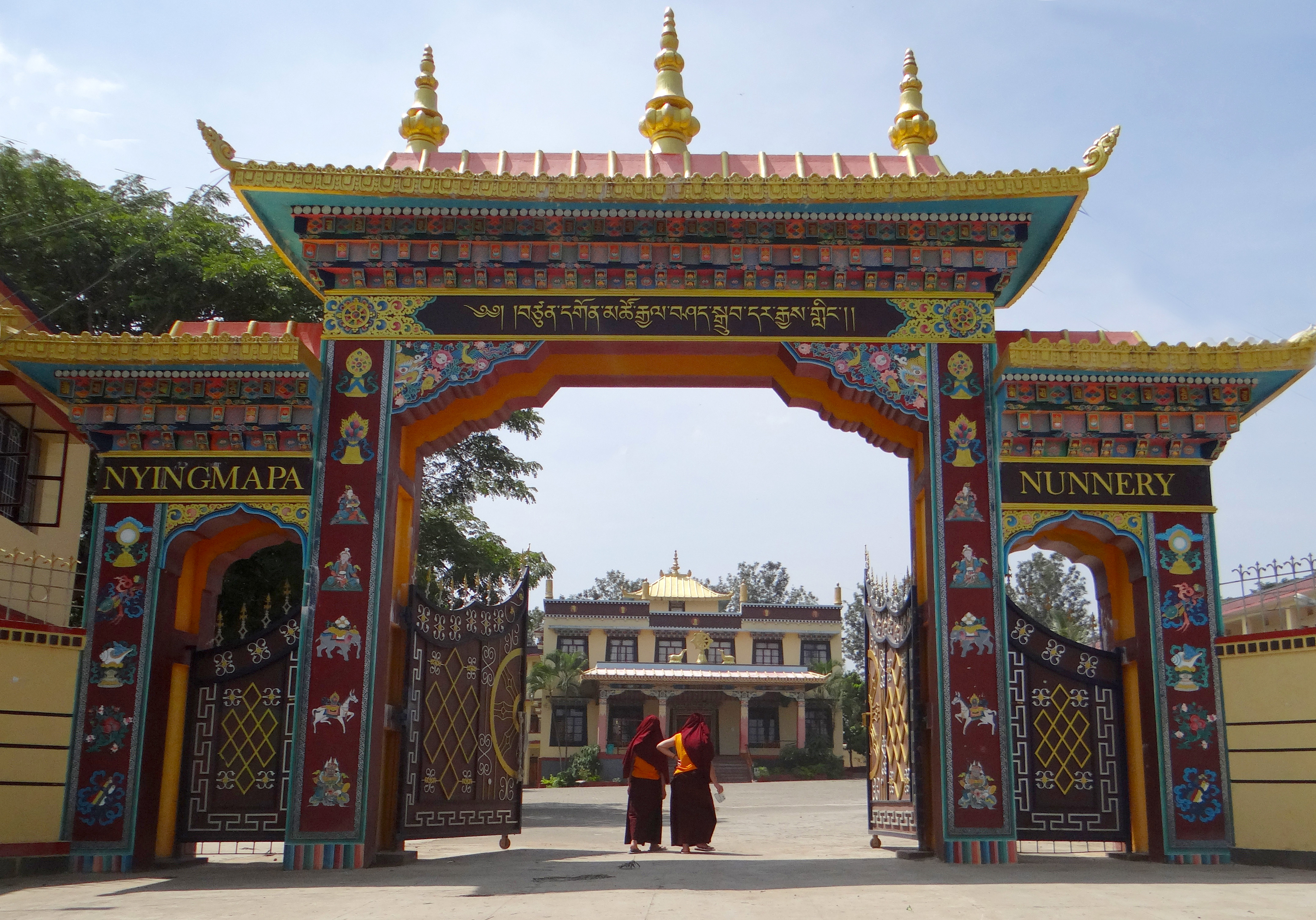

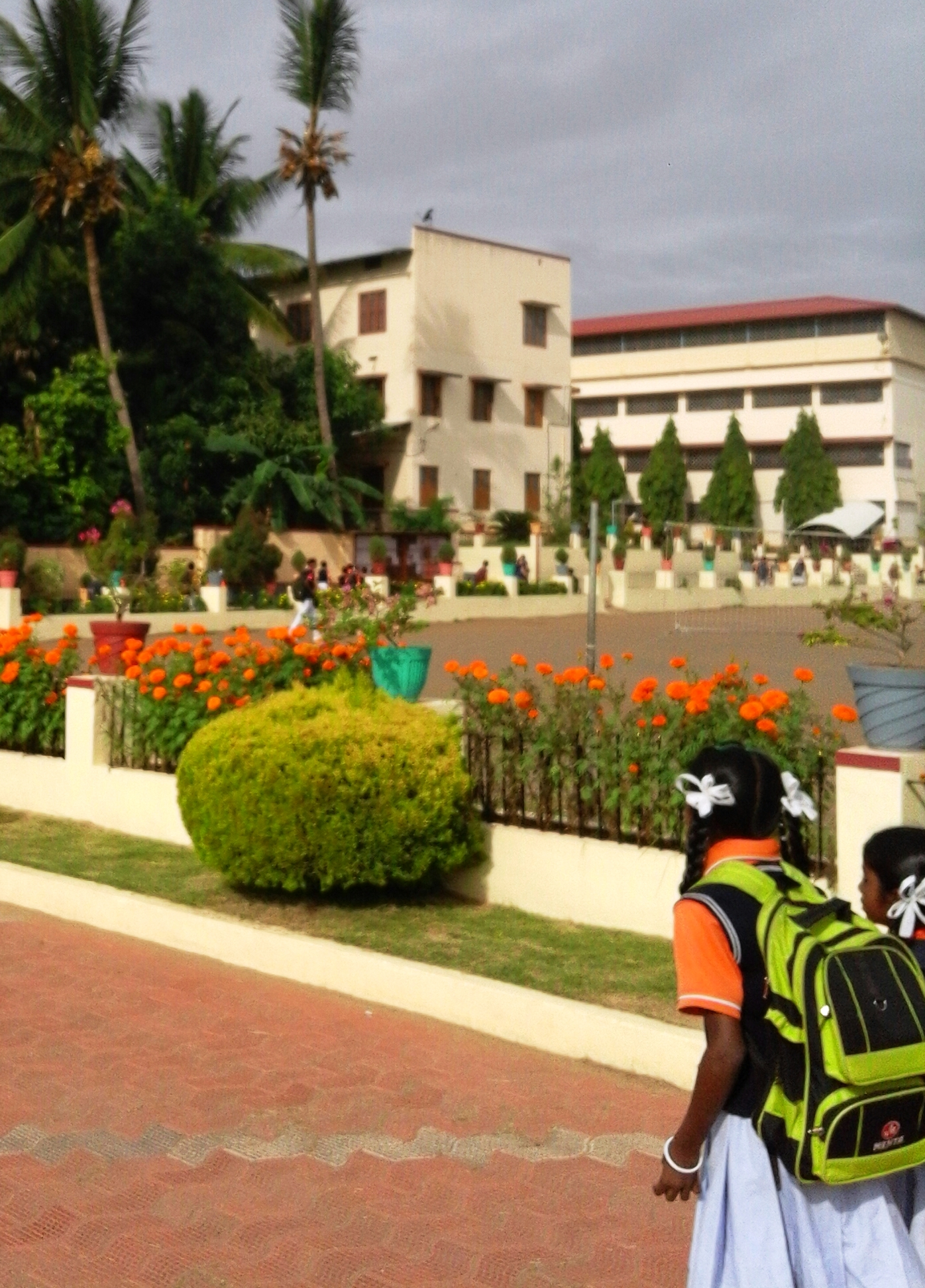
