= Scott's Bungalow =

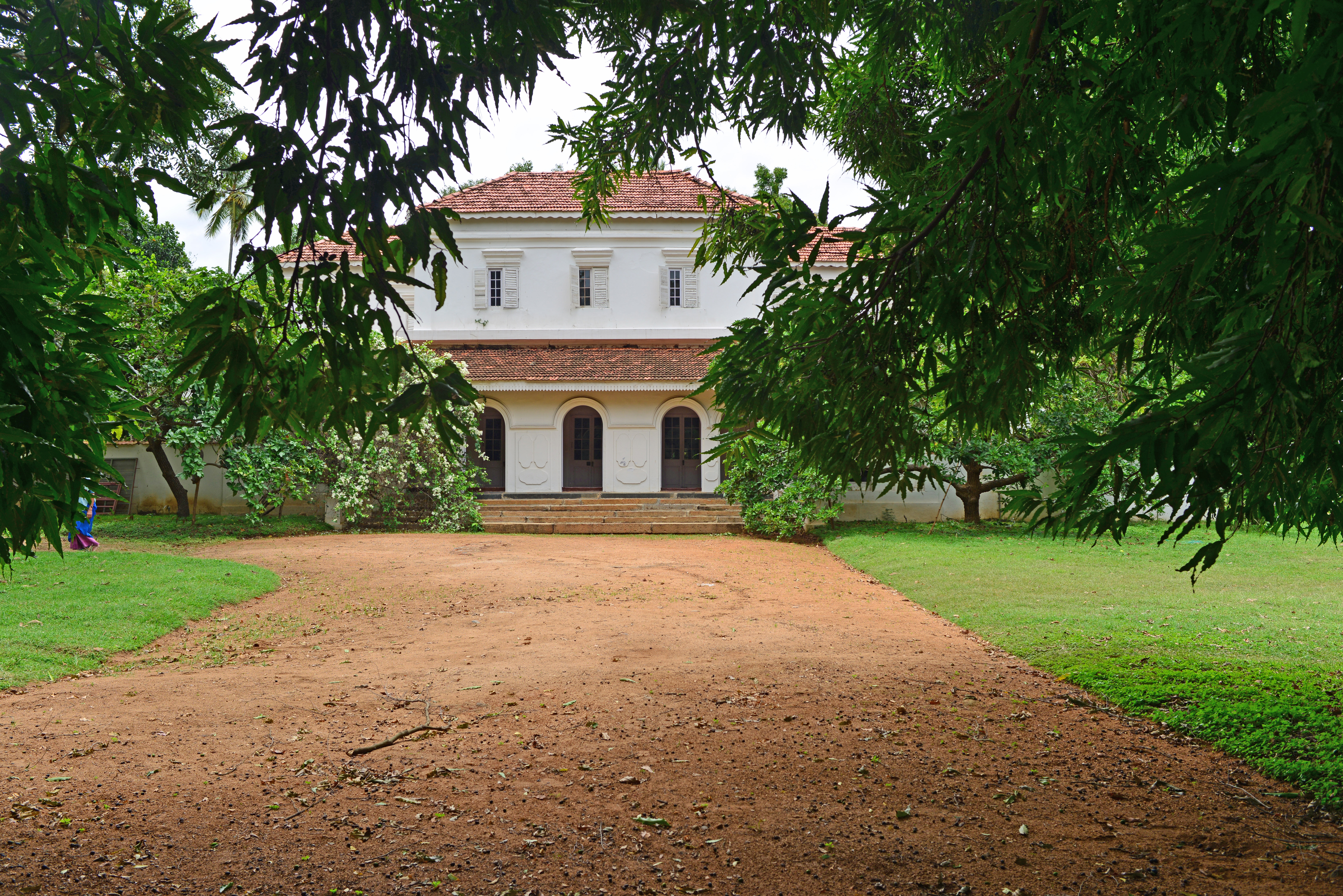
- Scott's Bungalow, Seringapatam
- Interactive map of the Scott's Bungalow area

General information
- Type: House
- Architectural style: British Bungalow
- Location: Seringapatam, India
- Coordinates: 12.4089°N 76.6864°E
- Construction started: 1800
- Governing body: Private Residence

The Scott's Bungalow is located in Seringapatam on the banks of the river Cauvery, at about half a mile from the Mysore Gate of the Seringapatam gate. The bungalow was the residence of Col. Scott, an officer of the Madras Army who took part in the Siege of Seringapatam in 1799. The bungalow is associated with the legend and tragedy of Col. Scott. The Deserted Bungalow, a poem by Walter Yeldham that was published in 1875, laments the fate of Scott's Bungalow.

== Background ==
The Fourth Anglo-Mysore War between the British East India Company and the Tippu Sultan reached its conclusion at the Siege of Seringapatam. The British achieved a decisive victory after breaching the walls of the fortress at Seringapatam and storming the citadel (during which Tipu Sultan was killed). After the fall of Tipu Sultan, the British restored the Kingdom of Mysore to the original Hindu Rajas (the Wodeyar Dynasty), from whom Hyder Ali had usurped the Mysore State. The Fort of Seringapatam was made into a garrison town of the Madras Army of the East India Company.

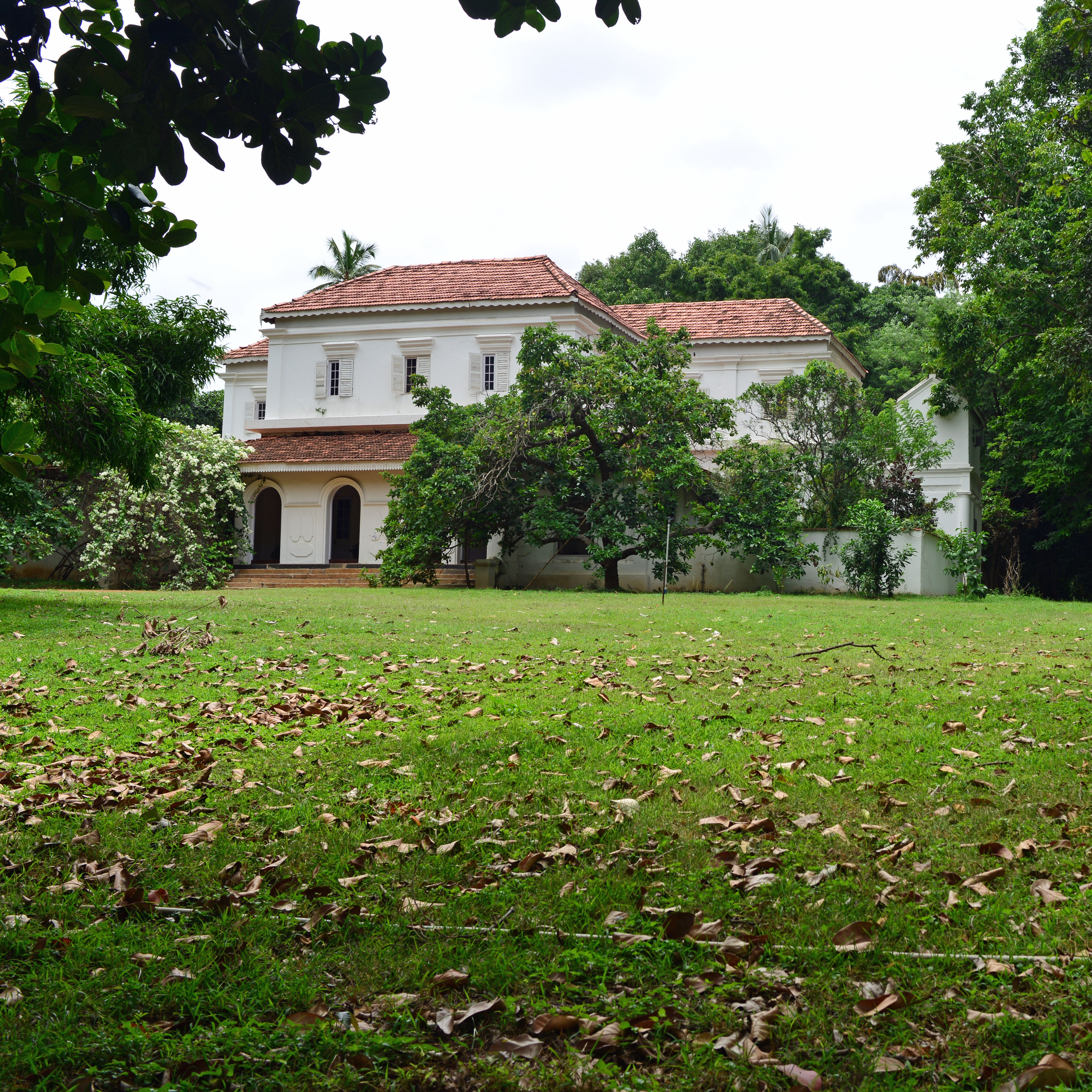
Scott's Bungalow, Seringapatam (2015)

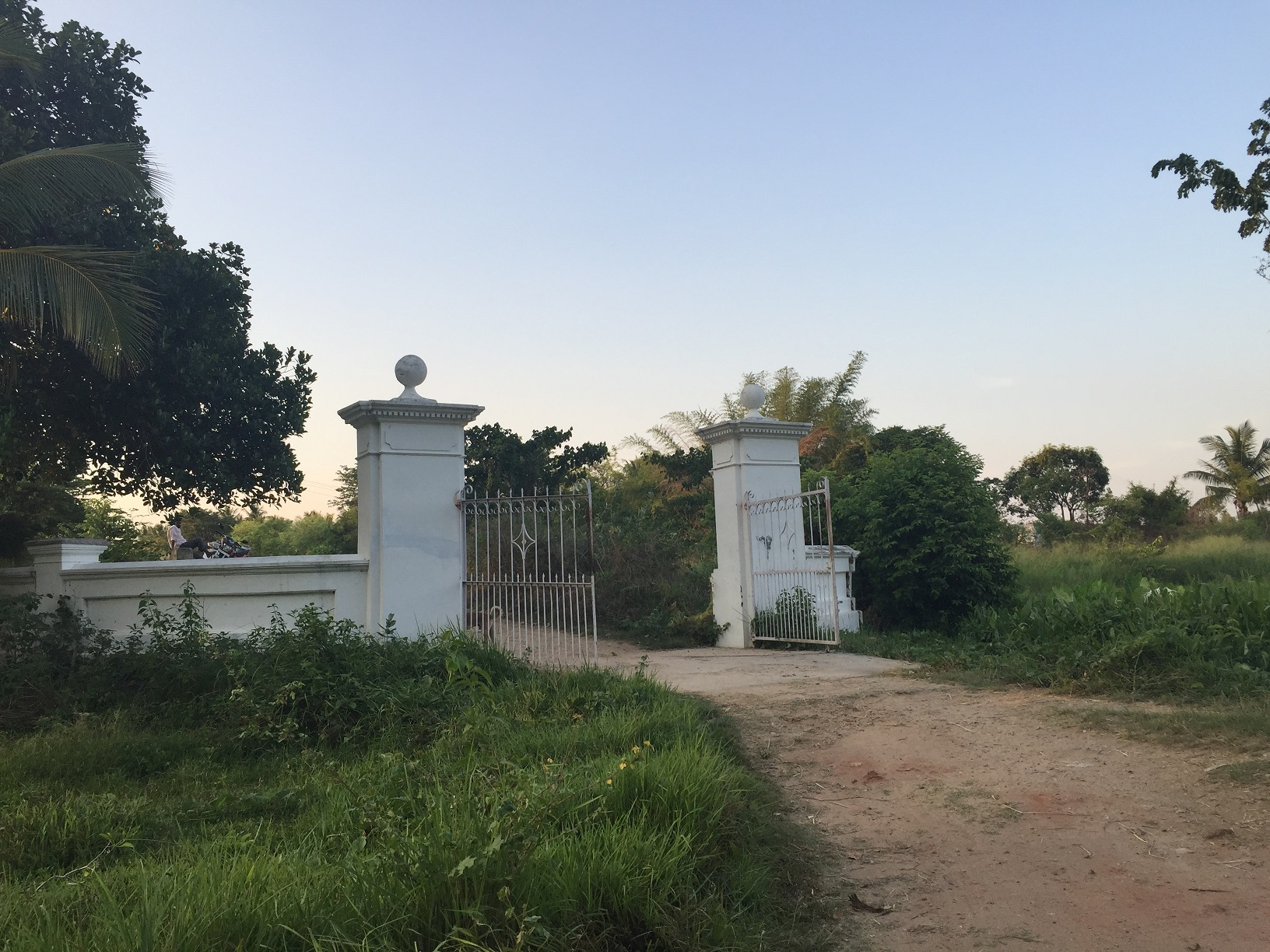
Scott's Bungalow Gates, Seringapatam (2016)

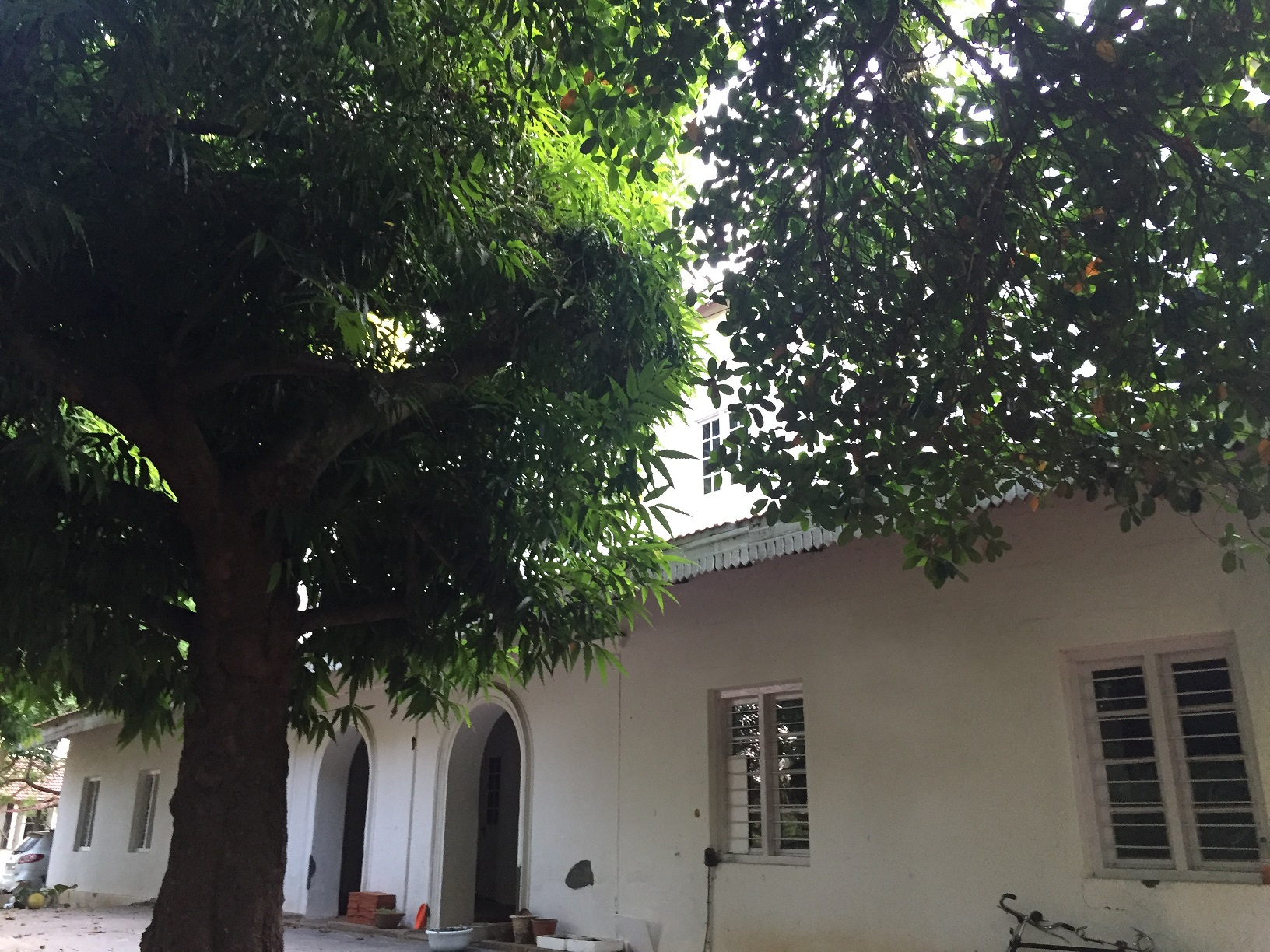
Scott's Bungalow, Seringapatam (2016)

== Captain Scott ==
After the British victory at Seringapatam in 1799, Captain Scott was supervising a gun factory, in the village of Ganjam. This factory was inspected in 1800 by Dr. Buchanan, and in 1803 by Lord Valentia, who remarked that Scott had been able to teach gun-making skills to the locals in a short period of time. For the guns, Scott was using the teak wood from the surrounding forests. By 1817, Scott was promoted as Colonel, and was commanding garrisons at the French Rocks and at Seringapatam. He is said to have developed close relationship with the Maharaja, who is believed to have built the Bungalow for Scott on the banks of the river.

== The legend ==
Col. Scott was one of the officers of the Madras Army who participated in the final assault on Tipu Sultan in 1799. After the war, in 1800, Col. Scott was placed in charge of the manufacturing of gun carriages at the Fort, and lived in the Bungalow by the river Cauvery. One day in April, Scott left on his horse for inspection at the French Rocks garrison, and returned the next day. On return, the day being 19 April 1817, he found his wife and two daughters all dead of cholera. After this, according to local legend, Col. Scott is said to have disappeared suddenly without a trace. Some other locals believed that he had driven his horse carriage into the torrential Cauvery River. The Mysore Maharaja (according to some accounts, the Governor of Seringapatam) gave orders for the house and furniture to be maintained as it is, on the hope that Col. Scott would return one day. This never happened, but succeeding kings of the Wodeyar dynasty kept the tradition of maintaining the Scott’s Bungalow alive.

== The reality ==
According to other accounts, while the story of the tragedy of Col. Scott losing his wife and children are true, his wife is said to have died during childbirth on 19 April 1817 and his two daughters due to cholera. Also, few others discount the fact that the Cauvery in April is never in a torrential flow. Scott never really vanished as the legend says. Rather, Scott left the Bungalow as it stood, and left to Madras without informing any locals or the Mysore Government, and there he was able to get medical leave and proceeded to England (or Ireland). There, in 1821, he was promoted to major-general and died in London on 1 January 1833. The bungalow had remained un-tenanted and untouched. It was cleaned and maintained on a regular basis, and according to witnesses who viewed it in 1906, it was still left the same way as Scott has left it in 1817.

== Caroline Isabella Scott ==
Constance Parsons records seeing the grave of Scott's wife at the Garrison Cemetery, Seringapatam, with the inscription that reads "Caroline Isabella Scott (and infant child), wife of Colonel I C Scott, Commandant of Seringapatam; who died in child-bed, 19th April 1817". However, the graves of his two daughters could not be traced. The death is also recorded in the Blackwood's Magazine of 1818 and other records, as Mrs. Caroline Grant, lady of Col. J G Scott of the Madras Artillery on 19 April 1817 at Seringapatam. Another records the birth of a still born child for the lady of Col. Scott on 14 April 1817.

== Description of the bungalow ==
In 1931, Constance Parsons describes the bungalow as nested between pipal, tamarind and casuarina trees, with monkeys bats and birds in abundance. The Bungalow had a few remaining chairs, tables, lamps and cots. There was a large inlaid bed, made of ivory, with an underneath compartment to hold a tiger, which was removed from Tipu Sultan's palace and kept here. The bungalow had Mangalore tiles and was painted yellow. Near the bungalow, was the grave which was supposedly of Akbar Pasha, who was the 'guru' of Tippu Sultan, as recorded by Rev. F W Spencer.

== The Deserted Bungalow, by Walter Yeldham ==
The legend of the Scott's Bungalow at Seringapatam generated much interest after the poem called The Deserted Bungalow by Walter Yeldham, writing under his pen name of Aliph Cheem, and published in the book Lays of Ind. The poet begins by stating that his poem is "substantially true", and goes on to tell the story in 16 stanzas.

== Present status ==
In 1962, the Scott's Bungalow was purchased by an Australian/English lady Yvette Zerfas, wife of Dr. Freddie Zerfas who was working at the Holdsworth Memorial Mission Hospital, Mysore. The bungalow served as a venue for green organic markets till the early 2000s.

== Lord Harris's House ==
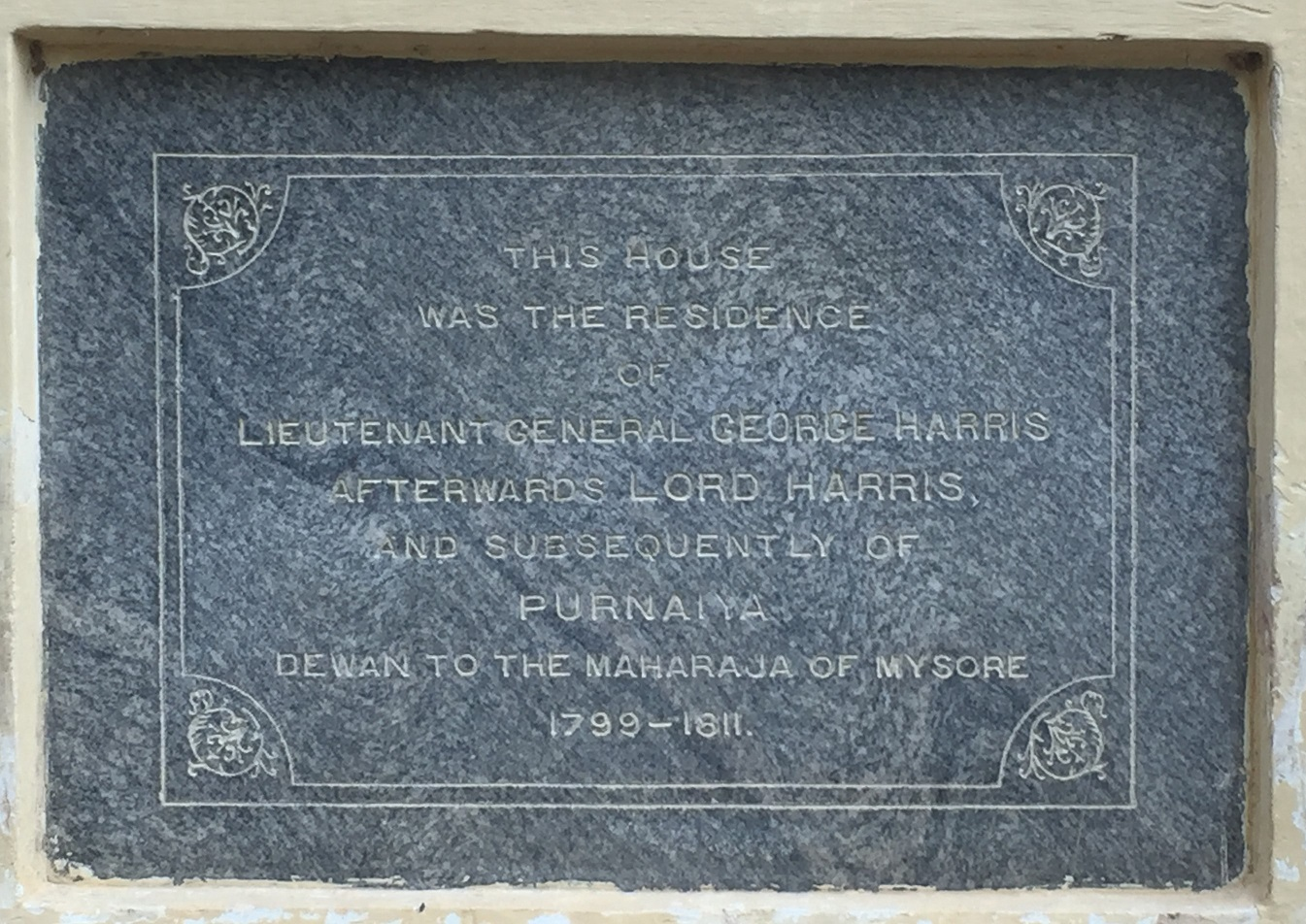
Inscription at the Lord Harris Residence, Seringapatam

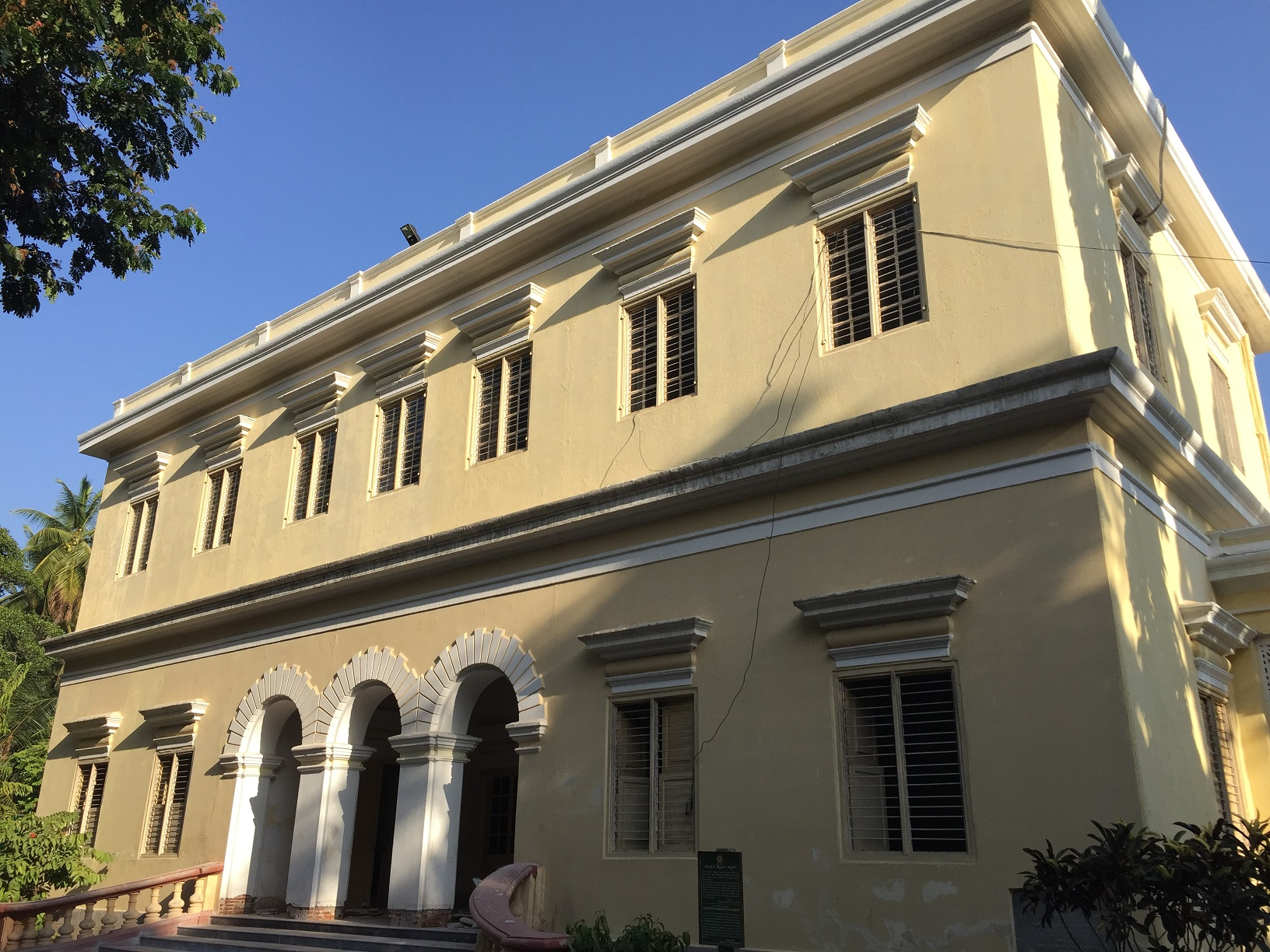
Lord Harris Residence, Seringapatam

Between the Garrison Cemetery and Scott's Bungalow, a path leads to house on the river banks. This house is known as Lord Harris's House or The Doctor's Bungalow or Puraniah's Bungalow. This house was the residence of General Harris, for a short time after the Siege of Seringapatam in 1799, and went on to become headquarters of the commanding officer of Seringapatam. In 1809, this house was the scene of a mutiny by officers of the Madras Army, led by Col. Bell, against Sir. George Barlow, the Governor of Madras.

Purnaiah, lived in this house after his retirement from service in 1811, and died here on 28 March 1812. Days before his death, he wrote a letter to his friend Col. Hill, Commandant of Seringapatam, "Old and infirm, after a life of unusual activity and care, I am going to the land of my fathers", for which Col. Hill replied "Say I am travelling the same road", and died a short time after Purnaiah.

A tablet on the wall of this house records the connection of Lord Harris and Puraniah to this house.

== See also ==
- Garrison Cemetery, Seringapatam
- Gumbaz, Seringapatam
