= St. Bartholomew's Church, Mysore =

St. Bartholomew's (St. Bart's)
- St. Bartholomew's Church
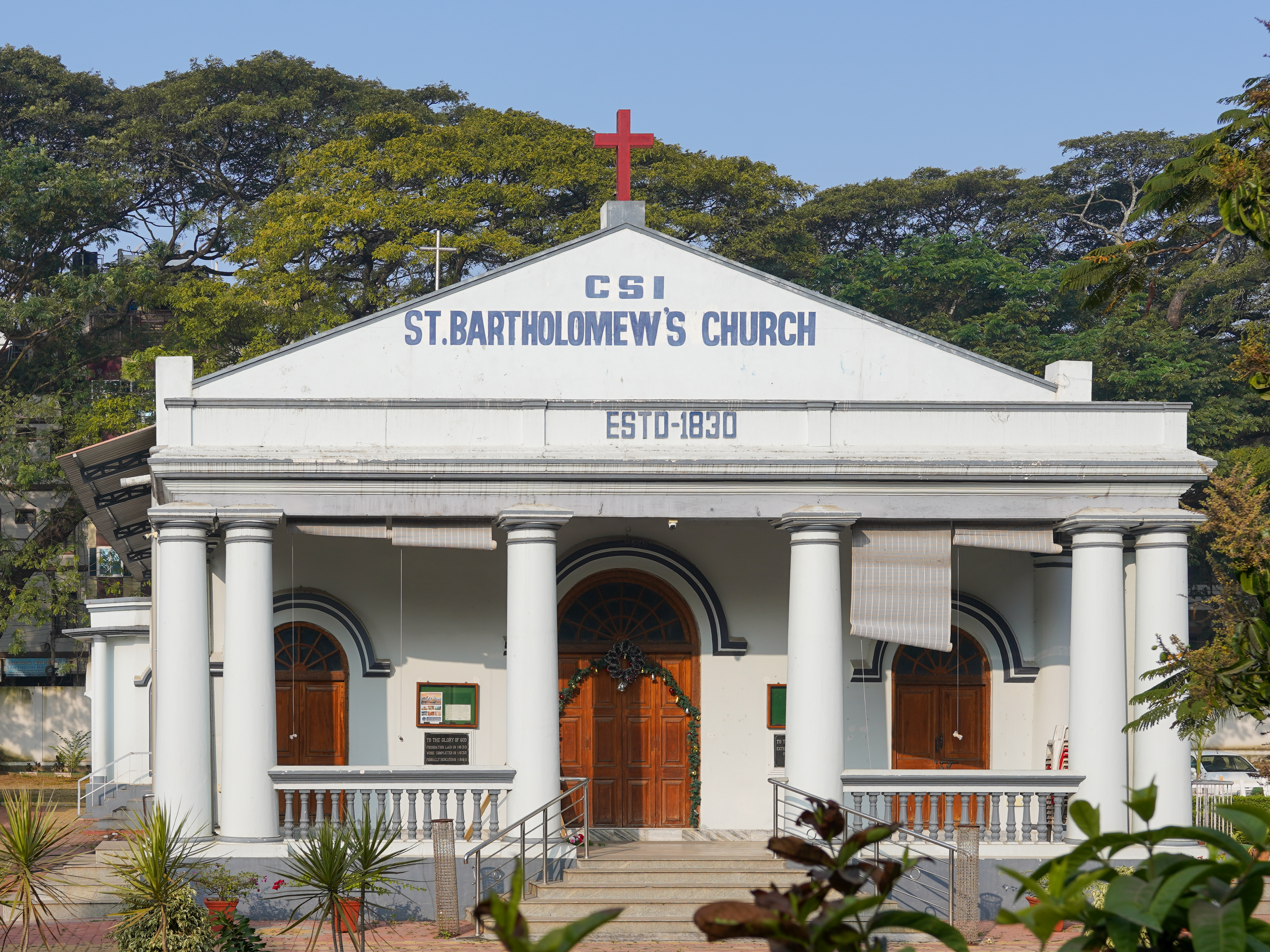
- St.Bartholomew Church
- St. Bartholomew's (St. Bart's)
- 12°18′36″N 76°39′26″E
- Location: Mysore
- Country: India
- Denomination: Church of South India
- Tradition: Anglican

History
- Former name: Anglican Church
- Consecrated: 29 November 1830 (ground)

Architecture
- Style: English
- Groundbreaking: 1830
- Completed: 1832
- Construction cost: INR 3,500

Administration
- Diocese: Karnataka Southern Diocese

Clergy
- Bishop: Rt. Rev. Hemachandra Kumar

St. Bartholomew's Church is an Anglican church, built by the Madras Government for the East India Company troops stationed in Kingdom of Mysore and is located in Lashkar Mohalla, on the Nilgiri Road, near the noisy Mysore sub-urban bus stand in Mysore City. The church grounds was consecrated on 29 November 1830 by Bishop Turner of Calcutta, (p. 327) and the building was completed in 1832. The church is named after Saint Bartholomew, one of the 12 apostles of Jesus Christ, and is said to have visited India in the first century AD, and preached the Christian gospel in the Kalyan, Thane and Raigad regions of present-day Maharashtra.

The church services at the St. Bartholomew's Church are conducted in English.

== History ==
St. Bartholomew's Church is amongst the oldest churches in Mysore and was established to serve the Christian congregations of the European officers under the service of the Maharaja of Mysore and the British Resident of Mysore. The land for the church was gifted by Krishnaraja Wadiyar III (1799-1868), and continued to be patronised by the successive Wadiyar rulers of Mysore. The then British Resident of Mysore, Arthur Henry Cole (1780–1844) (after whom Coles Park in Fraser Town, Bangalore is named) paid an important role in getting the support of the Maharaja of Mysore for the construction of St. Bartholomew's Church.

The cost of construction of the St. Bartholomew's Church was INR 3,500, which was borne by the European military officers and civilians of the congregation.

In 1847, the St. Bartholomew's Church got affiliated to the Anglican denomination. In 1852, the church was handed over the Government of Madras. The church was involved in schooling the children of European officers, offering English Education, when no other English medium school existed in Bangalore or Mysore.

The 175th anniversary of the St. Bartholomew's Church was celebrated in August 2005, on a grand scale.

== Bell Tower ==
The bell tower of St. Bartholomew's Church is constructed separately, away from the church building. The Stone inscription reads that the bell was originally cast in France in the mid 17th century for the use of French army base church in French Rocks, Erode village (now Pandavapura) near Srirangapatna. After the defeat of Tippu Sultan in 1799, by the British India Army, the area came under British Control, consequently handed back to the Wadiyars. In 1924, the old French church was dismantled to build Irwin Canal (now Visvesvaraya Canal). The bell along with few other remnants of the church was handed over to chaplin Rev. G A A Wright of St Bartholomew’s Church. The Bell tower was moved from the rear of the church to the front in 2002, and re-dedicated by the then Bishop, Rev. Dr. C L Furtado, Bishop of Church of South India, Karnataka Southern Diocesan, in the presence of the then presbyter-in-charge Rev. Premkumar Soans.

== Architecture ==
St. Bartholomew's Church is well known for its beautiful marble altar. Krishnaraja Wadiyar IV donated the expenses towards the stained glasses and teakwood paneling. In 1930, to mark the centenary celebrations, Krishnaraja Wadiyar IV donated towards a stained glass depicting St. Bartholomew, which was unveiled by Lady Wellington.

The church is single storied, with a simple, yet attractive architecture. The architect of the church is unknown.

== Gallery ==
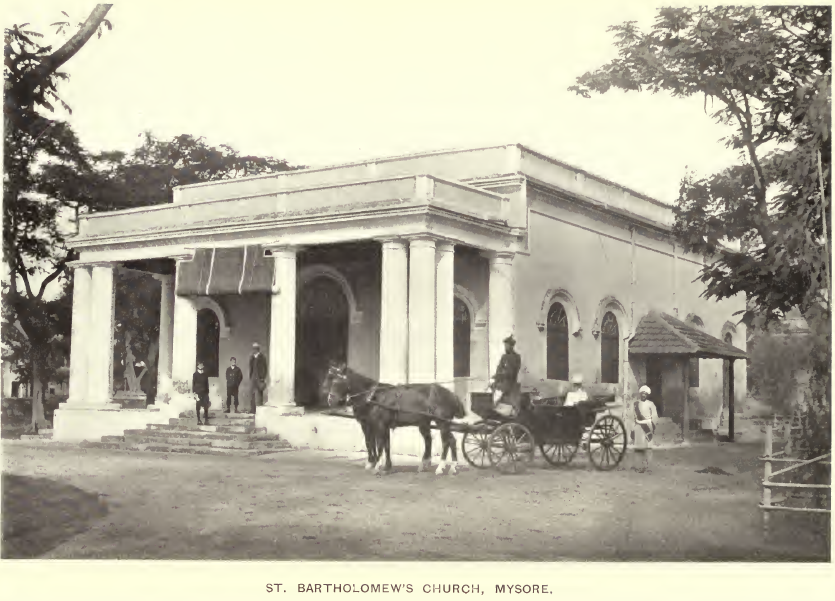
St. Bartholomew's Church, Mysore (1912), from Rev. Frank Penny's Book 'The Church in Madras, Volume II'

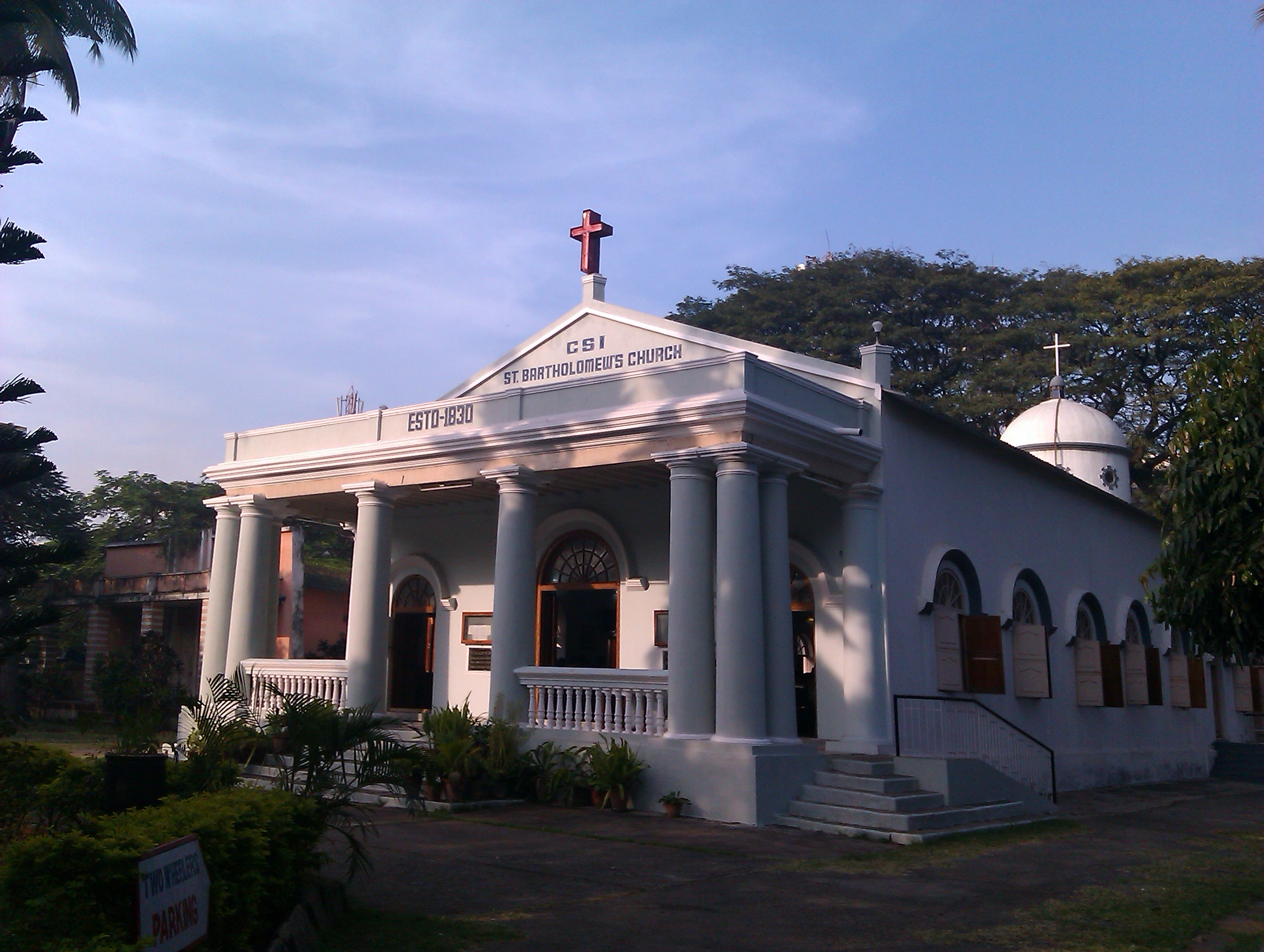
St. Bartholomew's Church (2011)

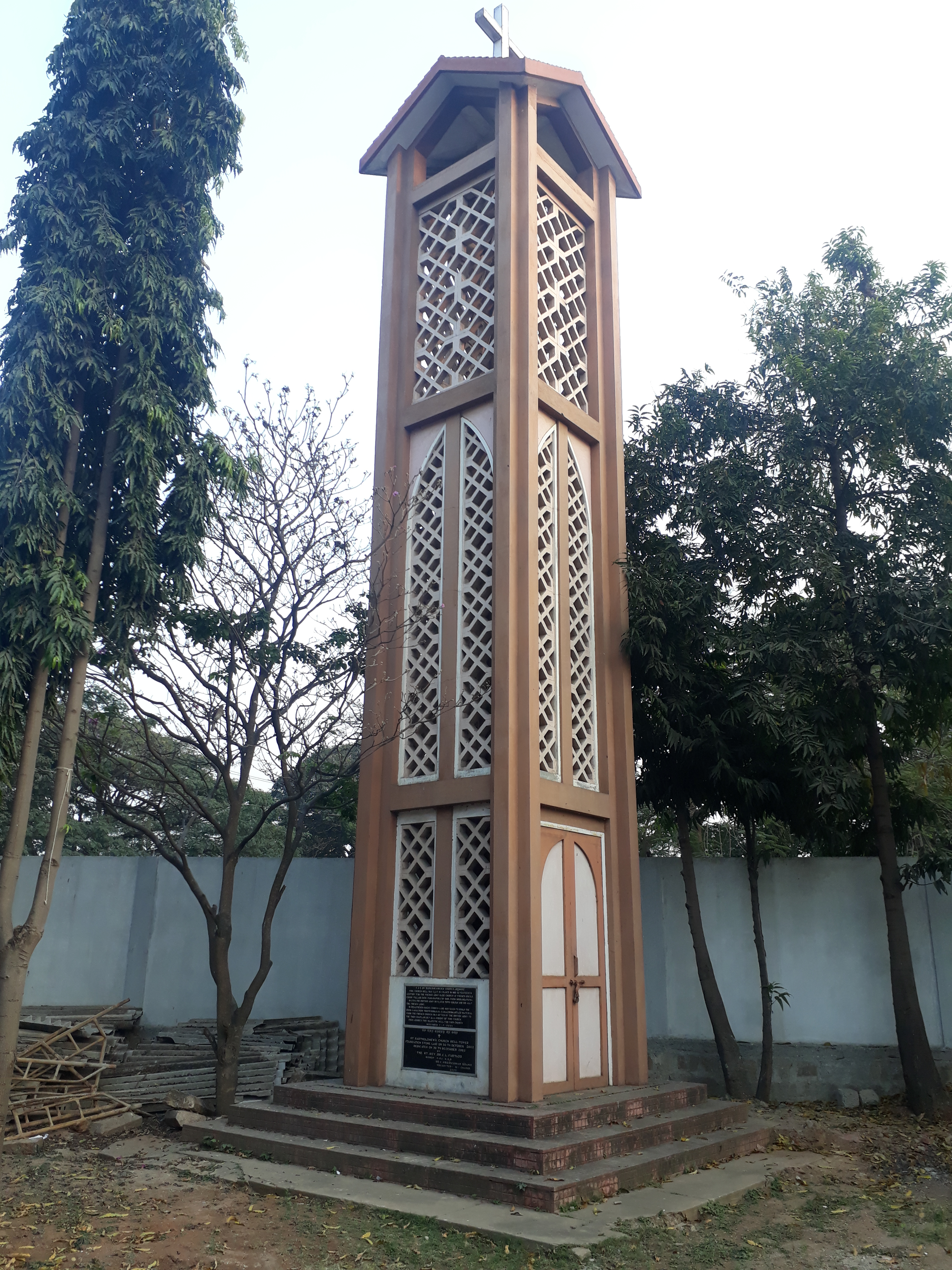
The Bell tower of St. Bartholomew's Church

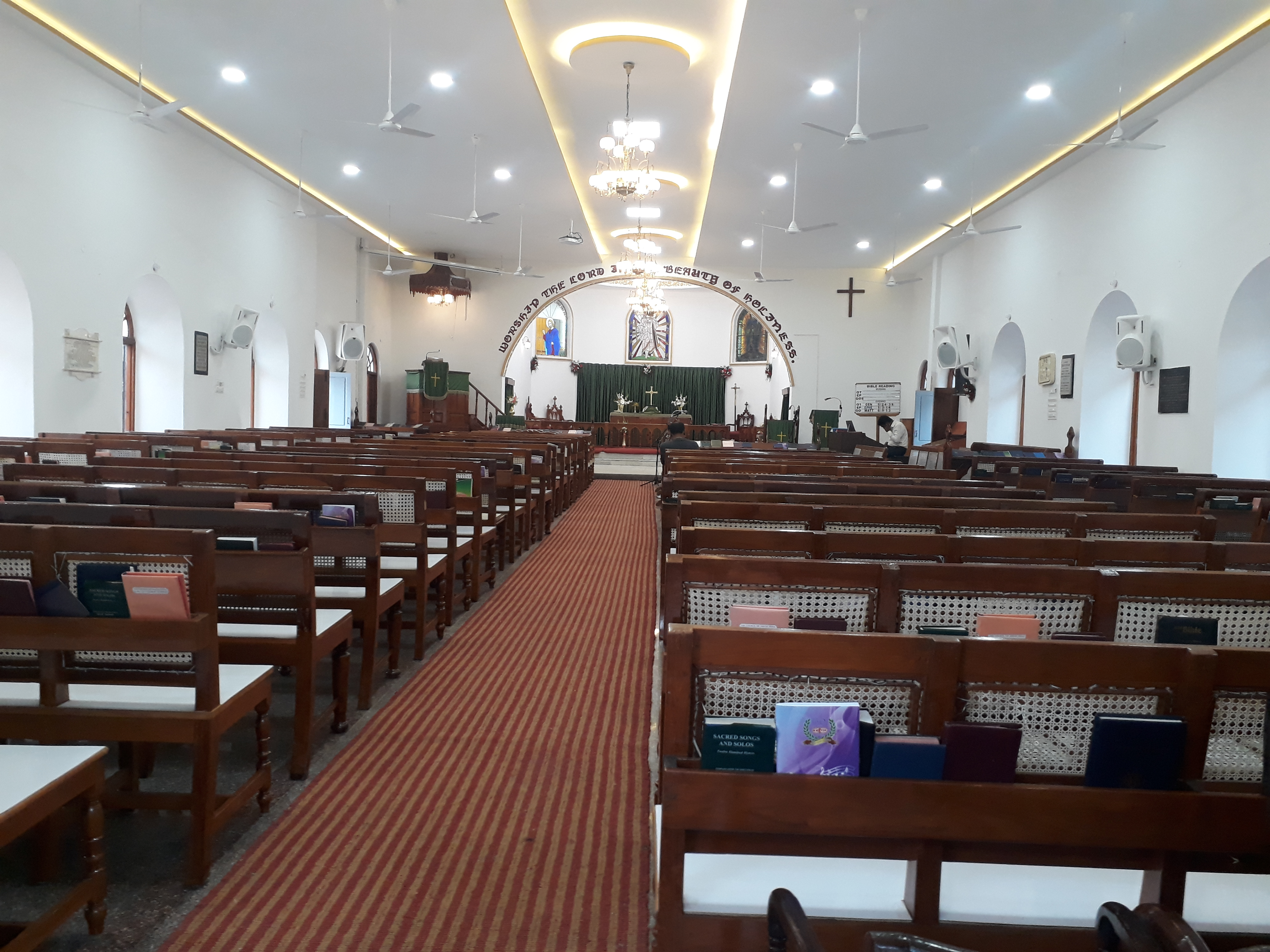
Inside of the St. Bartholomew's Church

== Visitors ==
Lord William Bentinck (1833-1835), Governor-General of India is said to have attended services in the St. Bartholomew's Church, while on an official visit to Mysore State. Prince Albert Victor on a visit to Mysore in 1889 and the Prince of Wales (later King George V) visiting Mysore in 1906, also offered prayers in the church. The Prince of Wales (later King Edward VIII also visited the church in 1921.

The visit of the Prince of Wales (later King George V) also resulted in many projects such as construction of rows of storehouses on Sayyaji Rao Road, opposite to the Devaraja Market, and sprucing up of the Purnaiaya Nala running from the Lansdowne Building to the railway level crossing near Jodi Thengina Mara, in honour of the visiting dignitaries.

== Memorial inscriptions ==
The church has a memorial inscription for Francis Lewis (died 1861), erected by his widow and children, describing it as a memorial for his piousness and missionary zeal in establishing the St. Bartholomew's Church at Mysore. There are also memorial inscriptions for Lt.Col. T M McHutchin (died 1873), Lt. Col. A H Macintire (died 1897), erected by their fellow officers and friends, and for Mrs. Mary Eden Benson (died 1895) (p. 327, p. 331).

== Community services ==
St. Bartholomew's Church started the Sunday School for children of the congregation in 1874, which continues till date. The church also looks after the maintenance of European and Christian cemeteries in the Mysore district and Seringapatam. The cemeteries attached to the church are the Garrison Cemetery in Seringapatam, the European Cemetery on Mysore-Bangalore Road, and Benson Cemetery on Mysore-Nanjangud Road. The church is also closely associated with the Holdsworth Memorial Mission Hospital, Mysore
