= Garrison Cemetery, Seringapatam =

Cemetery in India

Garrison Cemetery, Srirangpatna
- St. Bartholomew's Church, Mysuru
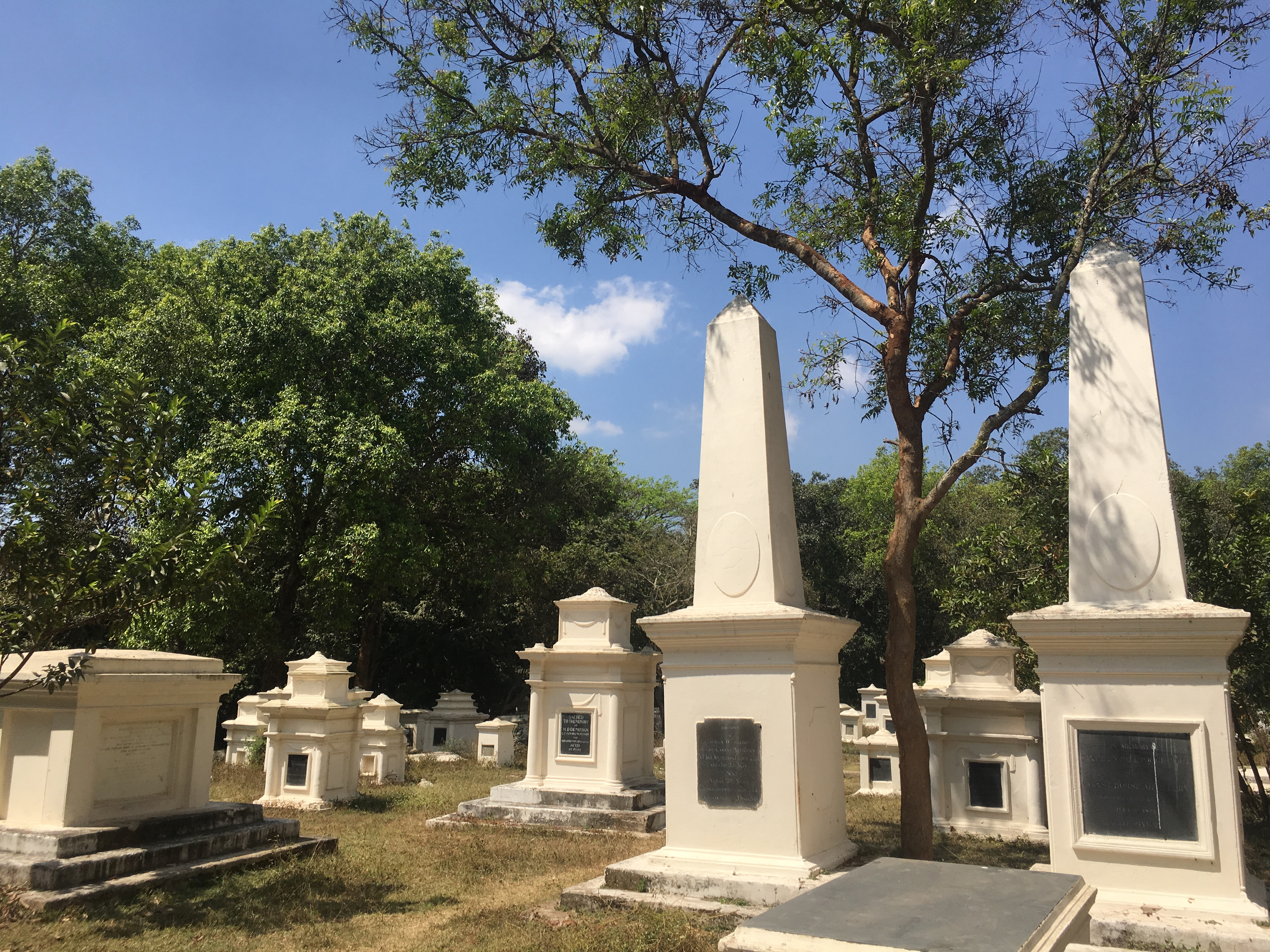
- Garrison Cemetery, Seringapatam
- Used for those deceased 1799–1860
- Established: 1799
- Location: 12°24′56.58″N 76°40′55.32″E near Seringapatam, India
- Total burials: 307

Burials by nation
- Switzerland: 307

Burials by war
- Siege of Seringapatam (1799)

Garrison Cemetery is located in Seringapatam, on the banks of the river Cauvery, about 300m from the Bangalore Mysore Highway. It has about 307 graves of the European officers killed in the final assault on Tippu Sultan in 1799, and their family members. Among the graves, there are 80 graves of the officers of the Swiss ‘de Meuron Regiment’, and the rest of the graves are their family members.

The cemetery entrance gate has a marble stone, reads, "Garrison Cemetery AD 1800. Latest burial 1860." A few tombs are imposing, while others are small, some shaped like of a coffin and said to be the remains of infants who died of the plague. Many officers of the Swiss mercenary de Meuron Regiment are buried here.

== Regiment de Meuron ==
The Regiment de Meuron, was a Swiss mercenary unit, in the services of the Dutch East India Company, and even fought against the British East India Company in Ceylon. Following the abeyance of wage payments by the Dutch East India Company in Ceylon in 1795, the regiment held negotiations with the British East India Company and joined their services with 800 men. The Regiment de Meuron took part in the Siege of Seringapatam (1799) against Tippu Sultan.

== History ==
The Swiss officers of the Regiment de Meuron, who fell in the Siege of Seringapatam (1799) were buried at the Garrison Cemetery, Seringapatam. The first burial took place in 1800, and the cemetery was in use till 1860. The British East India Company turned Seringapatam into a garrison town, and the cemetery came to be known as the Garrison Cemetery.

The Garrison Cemetery, Seringapatam, is now under the management of the CSI St. Bartholomew's Church, Mysore.

== Record of Constance Parsons ==
In 1931, Parsons describes the cemetery having graves of many brave fallen soldiers. Among them, Lt. Col. Peter Dallas, who tried to save the life of Seyyid Saheb, J A Cassamaijor of the De Meuron Regiment, many young wives aged 20–24 years. One gravestone laments the loss of a young wife using Ben Jonson's epitaph for Elizabeth as

Underneath this stone doth lie
As much beauty as could die
Which in life did harbour give
To more virtue than doth live

== Grave of Caroline Isabella Scott ==
Constance Parsons records seeing the grave of Scott's wife at the Garrison Cemetery, with the inscription that reads "Caroline Isabella Scott (and infant child), wife of Colonel I C Scott, Commandant of Seringapatam; who died in child-bed, 19th April 1817."

The names are associated with the tragedy of the Scott's Bungalow, Seringapatam, which is located on the banks of the river Cauvery.

== Years of neglect ==
Years of neglect, resulted in the magnificent memorial stones going to the brink of imminent collapse. The whole place was overrun with weeds and thick bushes.

== Restoration ==
In 2007, Louis Dominique de Meuron, a descendant of the Regiment de Meuron, visited the Garrison Cemetery, along with his wife Monique. Saddened by the state of neglect of the cemetery, the couple engaged an agency in Mysore (Ravi Gundu Rao & Associates (RGRA)) to restore the graves. After their demise in 2012, restoration was continuously supported by their children Jean de Meuron and Dr. Sophie.

The graves were restored to their original state in consultation with the Karnataka State Archaeology Department, and formally handed over to the de Meuron family in November 2008. The cost of restoration was around INR 3 million

Lime and bricks were mainly used in the restoration, with the lime coming from a local quarry. Nearly 12–18 masons, craftsmen, and workers were involved in the restoration works.

Following the restoration, the Garrison Cemetery, Seringapatam is now included in the tourist itinerary of Mysore/Srirangapatna. Descendants of the soldiers often visit the cemetery and offer homage. The caretaker of the cemetery is Ms. Vidyalakshmi, a local history enthusiast.

== His Majesty's Cemetery, Ganjam ==
According to Rev. E W Thompson and other accounts, there used to exist a Madras Army cemetery called "His Majesty's Cemetery" at Ganjam, near the Gumbaz (a short distance in the North-West direction), much before the Garrison Cemetery. The cemetery was enclosed by a wall, with an inscription on the gate-post, "His Majesty's Cemetery, Ganjam, a.d. 1799–1808". It contains burials between 1799 and 1808, mainly from the 33rd Regiment. Daniel Pritchard, the music master of this regiment was buried at this cemetery in July 1799. Elinda Harmonci, a child aged 4 years was also buried here in November 1799.

Col. Edward Montague of the Bengal Artillery, died 8 May 1799, 4 days after the final assault is buried near the Sangam, on the extreme east end of the island.

== Lord Harris's House ==
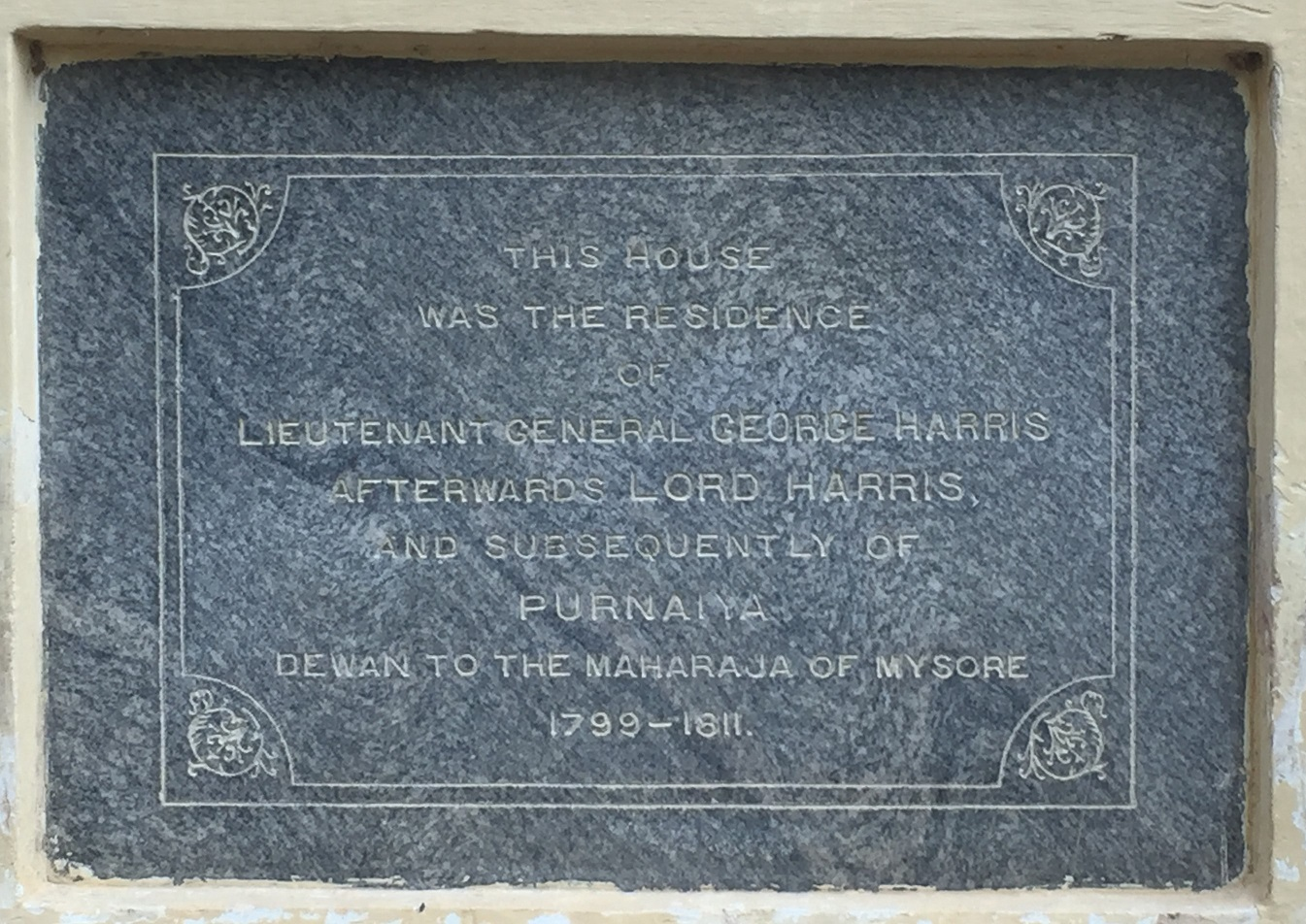
Inscription at the Lord Harris Residence, Seringapatam

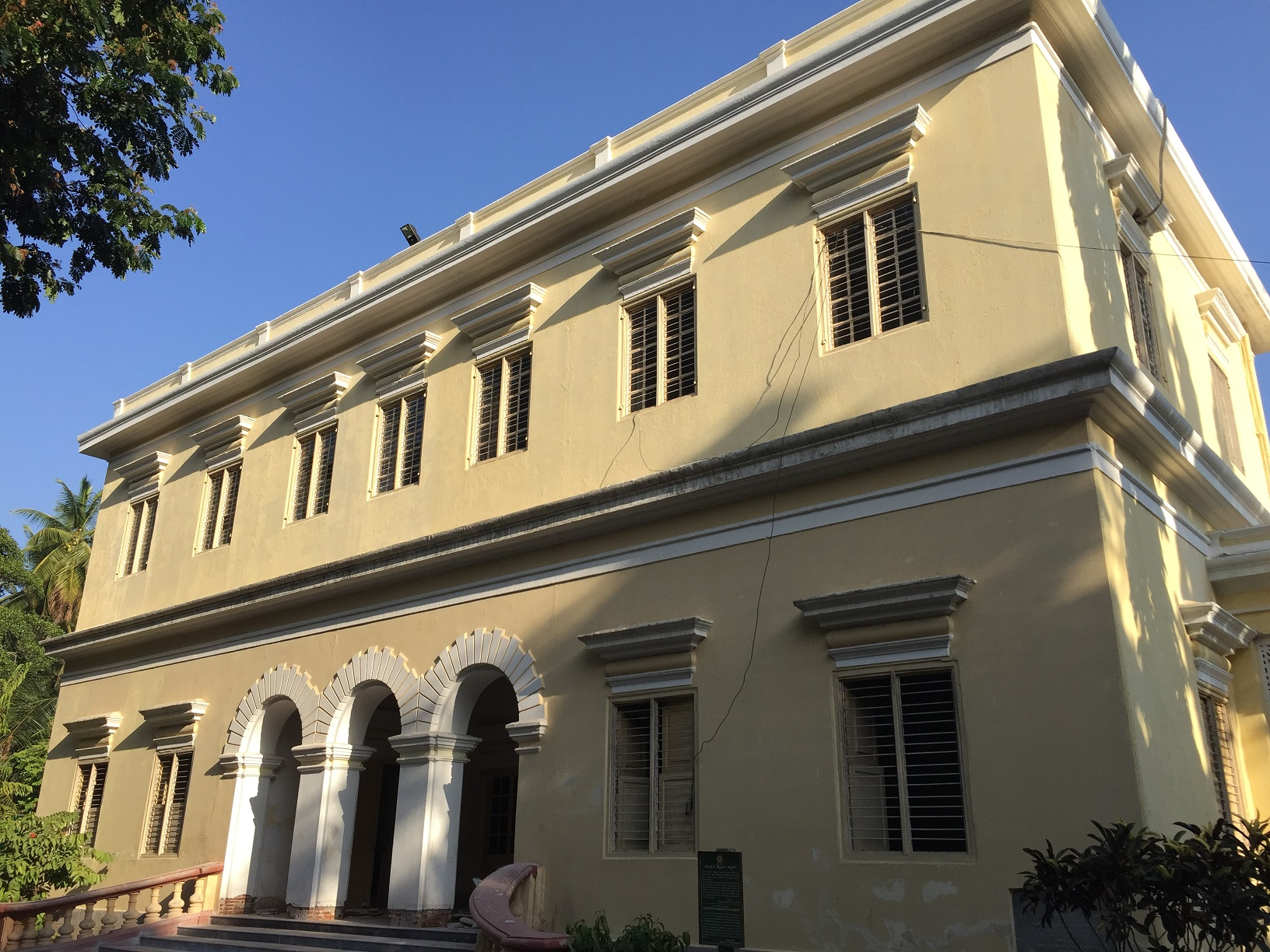
Lord Harris Residence, Seringapatam

Between the Garrison Cemetery and Scott's Bungalow a path leads to the house on the river banks. This house is known as "Lord Harris's House" or "The Doctor's Bungalow" or "Puraniah's Bungalow". This house was the residence of General Harris, for a short time after the Siege of Seringapatam in 1799, and went on to become headquarters of the commanding officer of Seringapatam. In 1809, this house was the scene of a mutiny by officers of the Madras Army, led by Col. Bell, against Sir. George Barlow, the Governor of Madras.

Purnaiah lived in the house after his retirement from service in 1811, and died there on 28 March 1812. Days before his death, he wrote a letter to his friend Col. Hill, Commandant of Seringapatam, "Old and infirm, after a life of unusual activity and care, I am going to the land of my fathers", for which Col. Hill replied "Say I am travelling the same road", and died a short time after Purnaiah.

A tablet on the wall of this house records the connection of Lord Harris and Puraniah to this house.

== See also ==
- Regiment de Meuron
- Siege of Seringapatam (1799)
- Anglo-Mysore Wars
- Scott's Bungalow
- Gumbaz, Seringapatam
