= Gumbaz, Srirangapatna =

Islamic mausoleum in Karnataka, India

Gumbaz
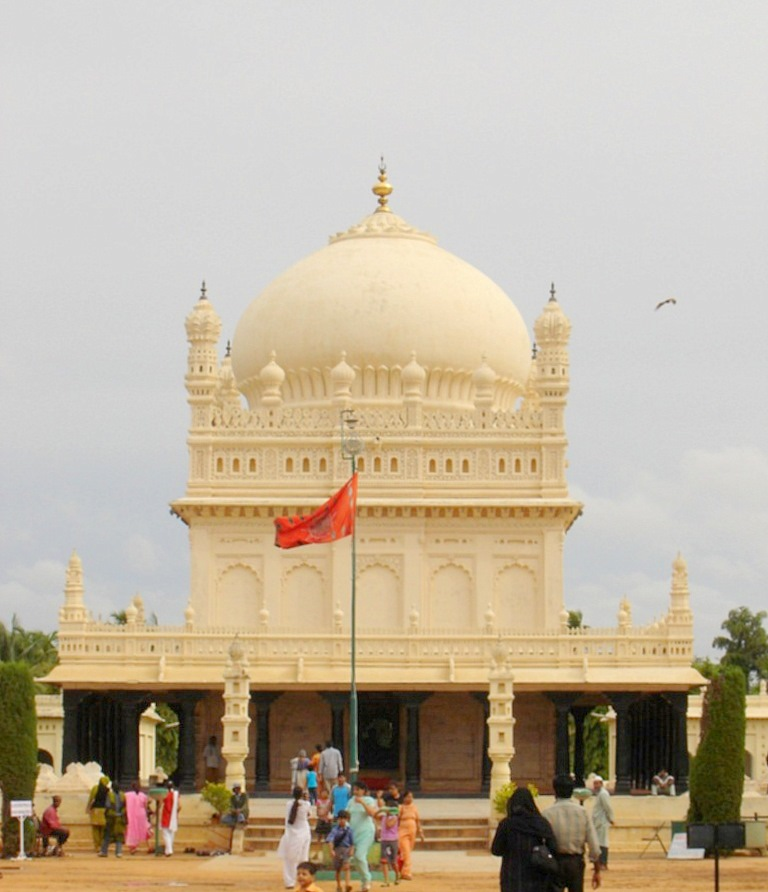
- Gumbaz
- Interactive map of Gumbaz
- Location: Srirangapatna, India
- Coordinates: 12.4100°N 76.7139°E
- Type: Mausoleum (Persian)
- Material: Black Granite and Amphibolite
- Height: 20 metres (66 ft)
- Beginning date: 1782
- Completion date: 1784
- Dedicated to: Hyder Ali, Tippu Sultan and family
- Variant Names Tippu Samadhi

The Gumbaz at Ganjam Srirangapattana is an Islamic mausoleum located in centre of a beautiful landscaped gardens, holding the graves of Tipu Sultan (Western Side), his father Hyder Ali (Middle) and his mother Fakhr-Un-Nisa (Eastern Side). It was built by Tipu Sultan to house the graves of his parents. Tipu was buried here after his death in the Siege of Srirangapatna in 1799.

== History ==
The Gumbaz was raised by Tipu Sultan in 1782-84 at Srirangapattana to serve as a mausoleum for his father and mother. The mausoleum was surrounded by a cypress garden which is said to have different species of flowering trees and plants collected by Tippu Sultan from Persia, Ottoman Turkey, Kabul and French Mauritius.

The original carved doors of the mausoleum have been removed and are now displayed at the Victoria and Albert Museum, London. The present doors made of ebony and decorated with ivory were gifted by Lord Dalhousie

== Architecture ==
The Gumbaz is designed in the Islamic style, with a large rectangle shaped garden, having a path leading to the mausoleum. In the middle of the garden, the Gumbaz stands on an elevated platform. The dome is supported by sharply cut black granite pillars. The doors and windows have latticework cut through in stone on the same black granite material. The walls inside are painted with tiger stripes, the colours of Tippu Sultan. The three graves of Tippu Sultan, his father Hyder Ali and his mother Fakr-Un-Nisa are located inside the mausoleum. Many of Tippu's relatives are buried outside the mausoleum in the garden. Most of the grave inscriptions are in Persian. Next to the Gumbaz is the Masjid-E-Aksa, which was also built by Tippu Sultan

The Gumbaz uses the Bijapur style of construction, and consists of a dome placed on a cubical structure, with ornamental railings and turrets decorated with finals which are spherical shaped. The dome is supported by 36 black granite pillars, and has an east facing entrance.

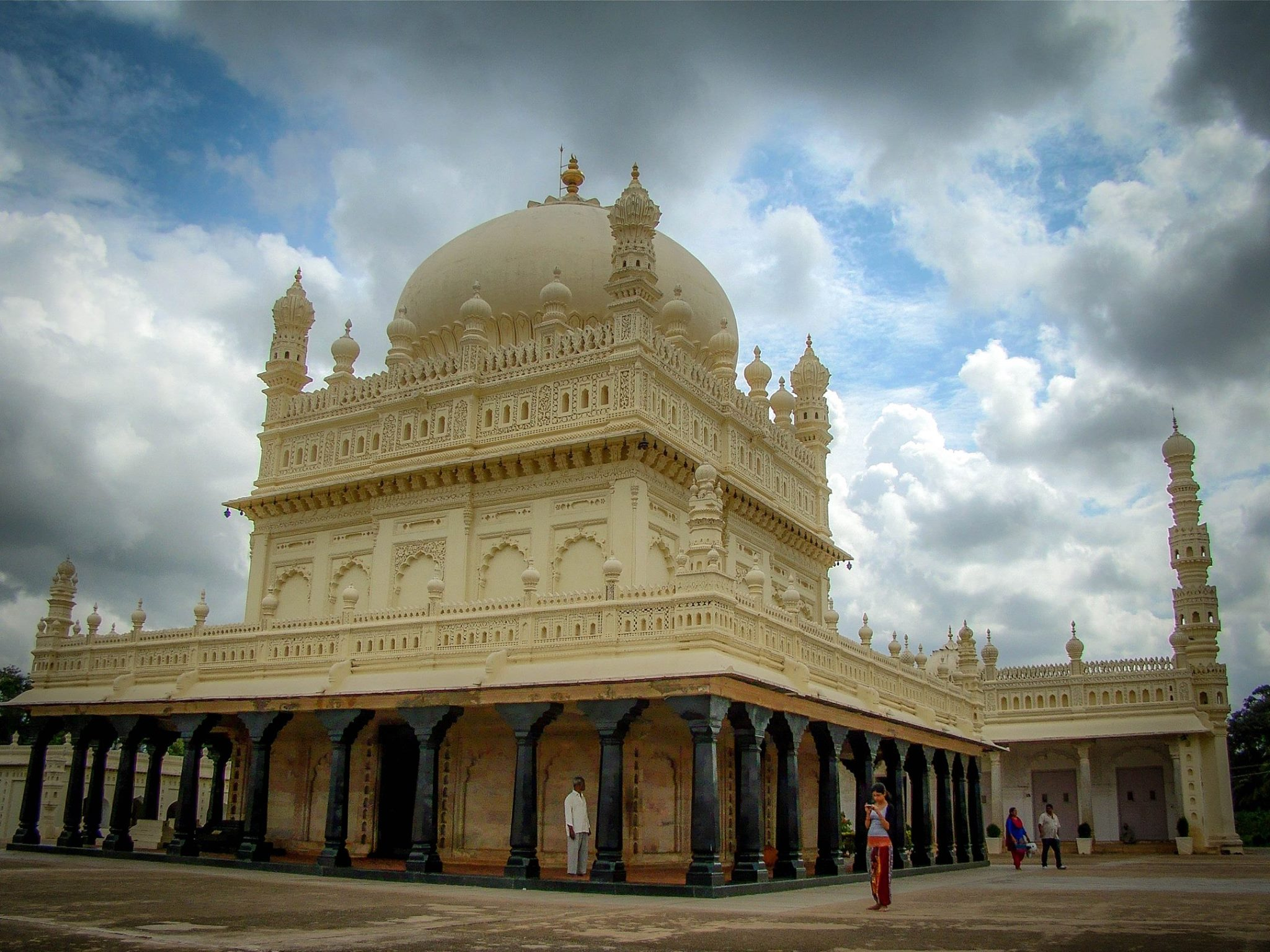
Gumbaz, Seringapatam

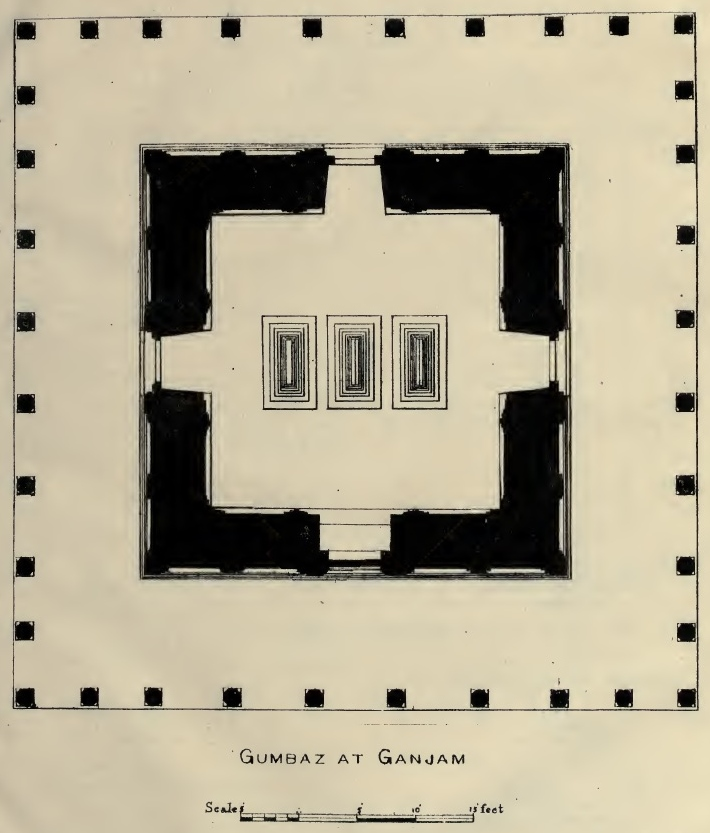
Plan of the Gumbaz at Ganjam, by B L Rice (1894)

== Burials ==
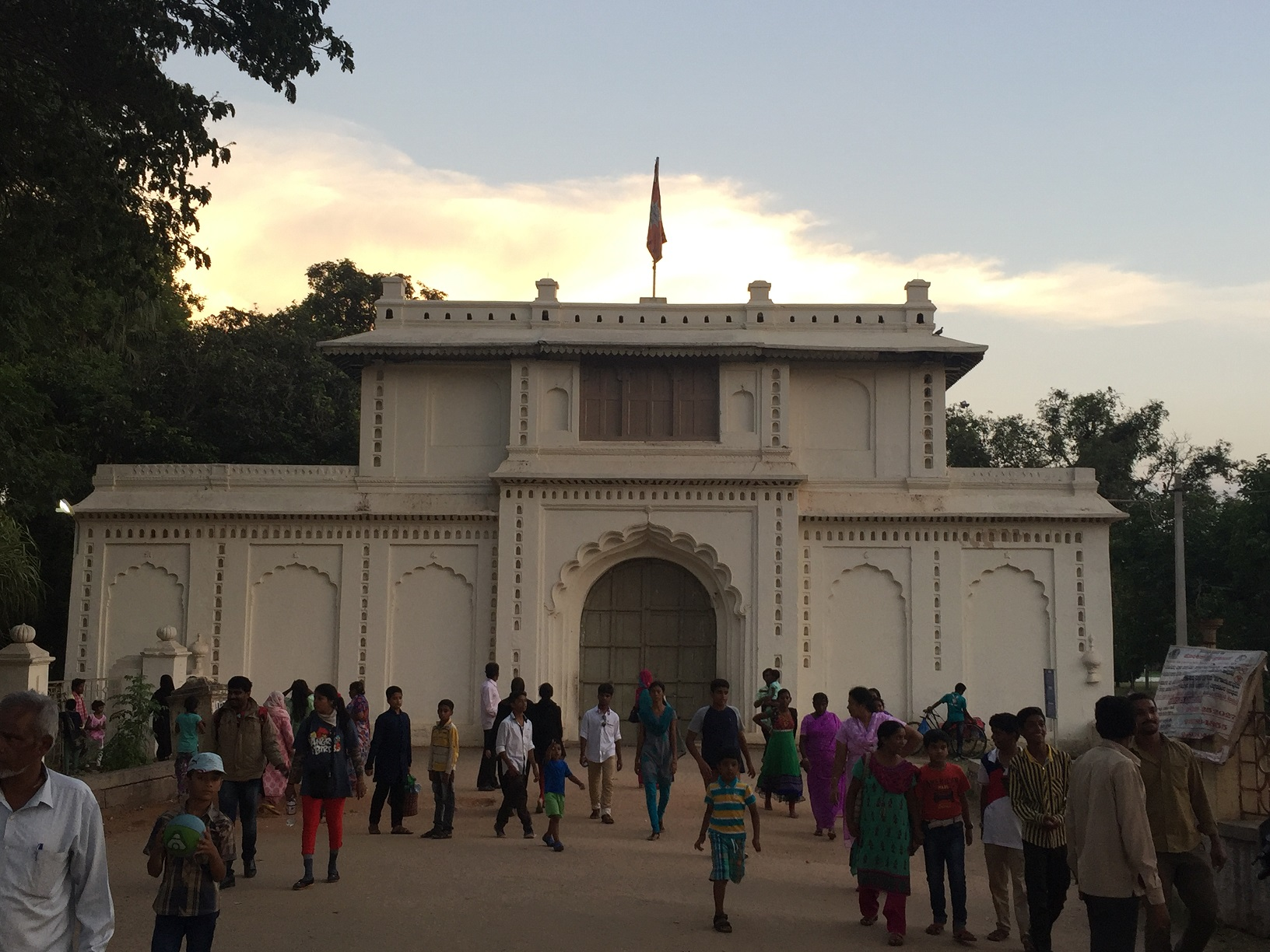
Gumbaz entrance, Seringapatam

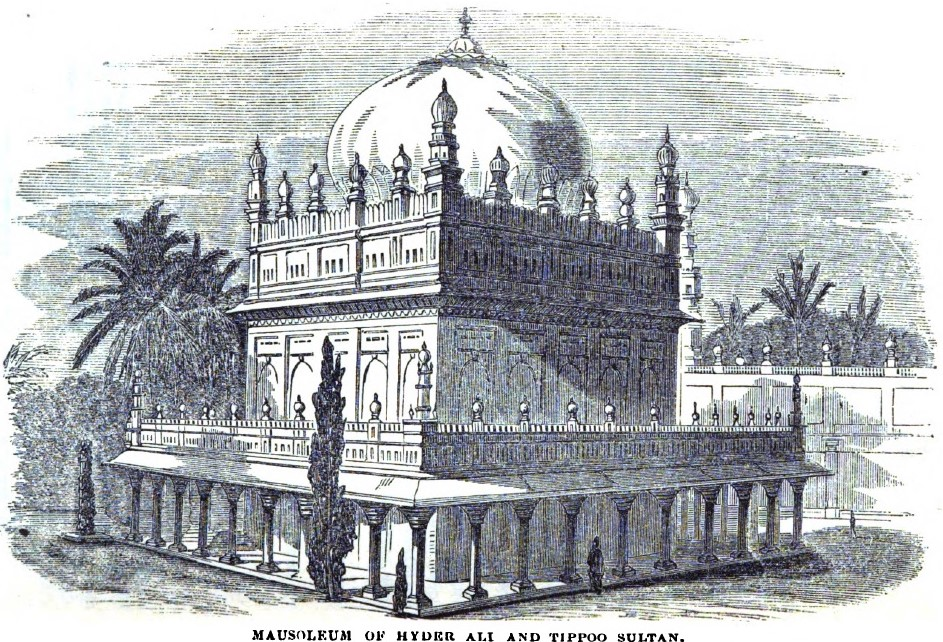
Mausoleum of Hyder Ali and Tipoo Sultan (1858)

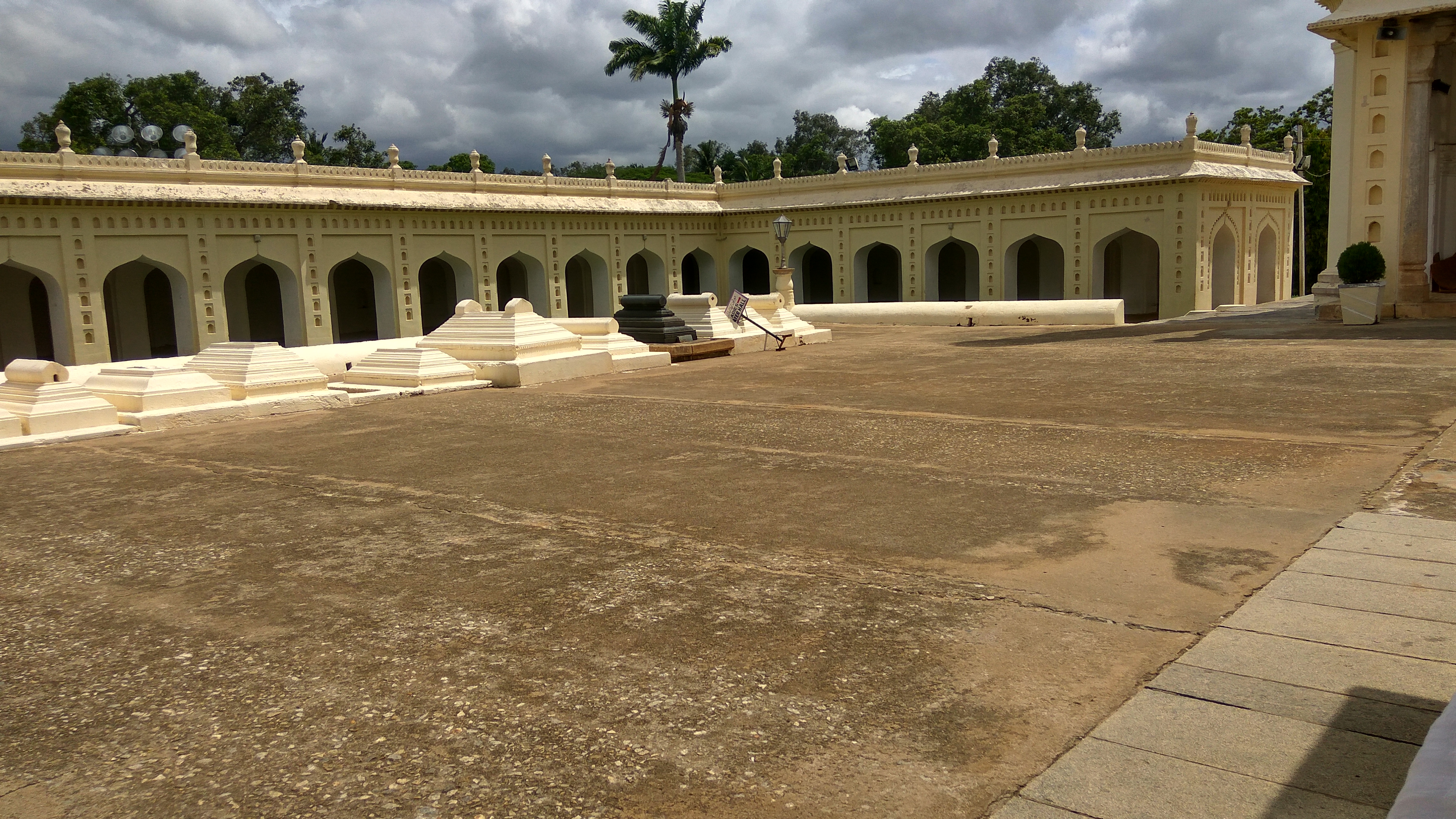
Burials outside the Mausoleum

Inside the mausoleum, the middle grave is that of Hyder Ali, to his east is Tipu Sultan's mother, and to his West Tipu Sultan is buried. On the southern side of the veranda outside are the graves of Sultan Begum - Tipu's sister, Fatima Begum - Tipu's daughter, Shazadi Begum - infant daughter, Syed Shahbaz - Tipu's son-in-law, Mir Mahmood Ali Khan, and his father and mother. On the East side is the black grave supposedly of Tipu's foster mother Madina Begum. There is an elevation on the veranda with 3 rows of graves, with the first having no headstones. Another row has 14 graves - 8 women and 6 men, including that of Malika Sultan e Shaheed or Ruqia Banu, Burhanuddin Shaheed - brother-in-law of Tipu and brother of Ruqia Banu, Nizamuddin and 1 unmarked grave. The third row consists of 14 graves, 9 women and 5 men and includes Nawab Muhammad Raza Ali Khan or Ban Ki Nawab who was killed in the Battle for Coorg, and an unidentified grave. On the northern side, there are many rows of graves of both sexes, with only a few having headstones.

== British Occupation, 1792 ==
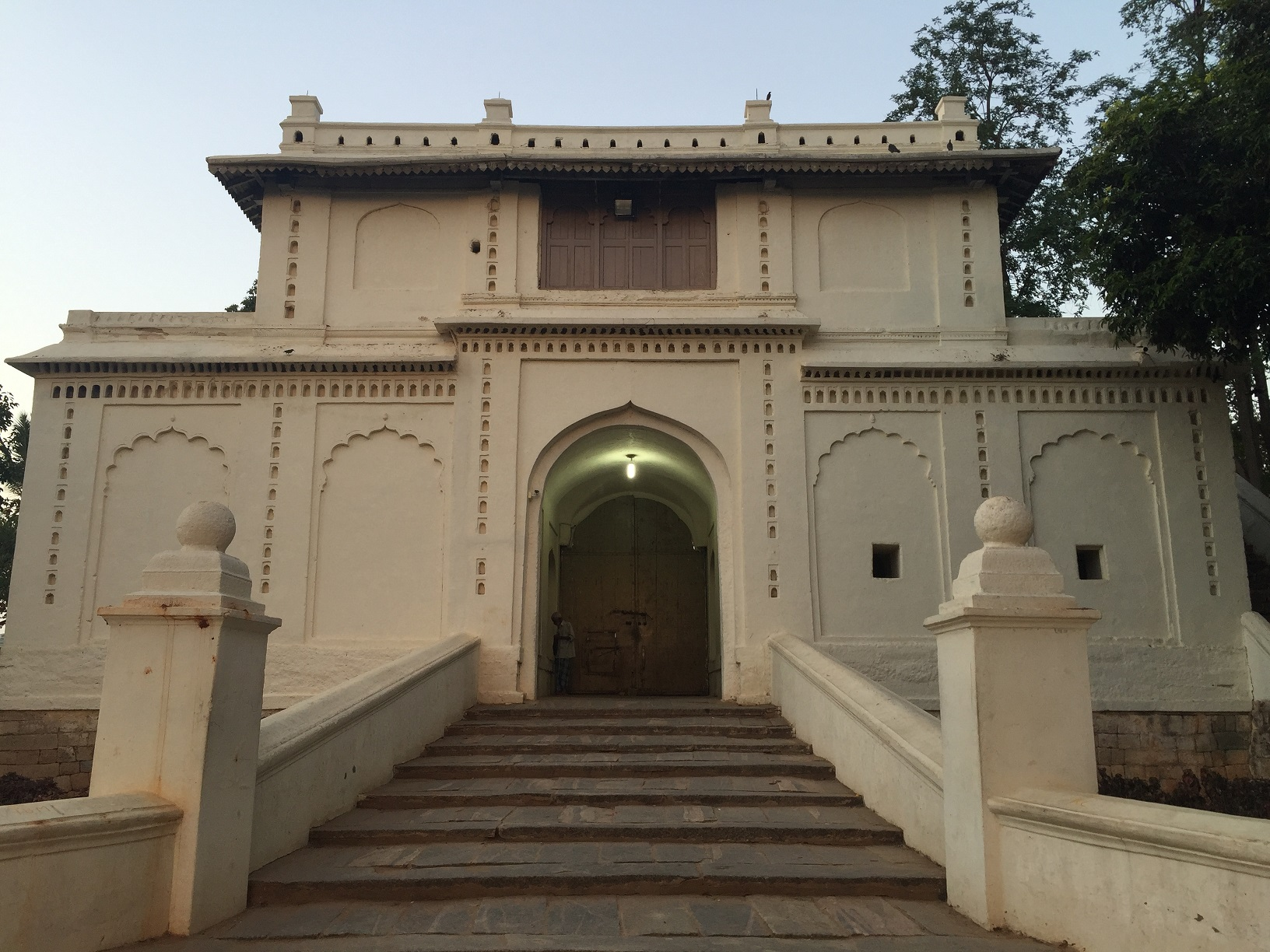
Gumbaz entrance (backside), Seringapatam

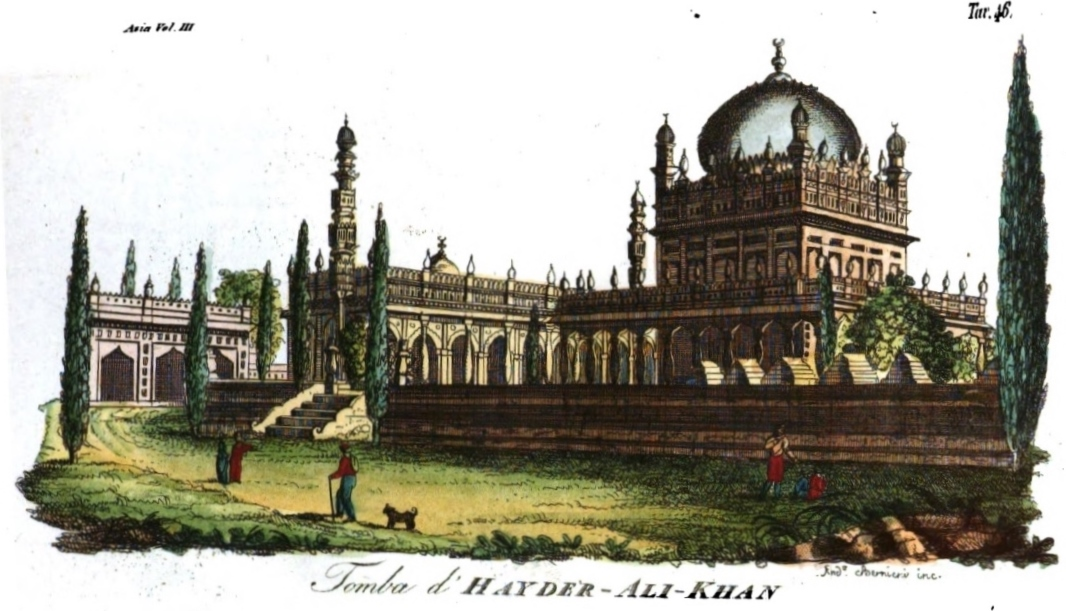
Tomb of Hayder Ali, by Dottor Giulio Ferrario (1824)

The grounds of the Gumbaz was briefly occupied by British India forces in 1792, towards the end of the Third Anglo-Mysore War. The army camped on the grounds, and cut down many cypress trees in the garden surrounding the tomb of Hyder Ali, to be used as tent poles and fascines. The flower beds surrounding the mausoleum were dug up for the burial of those who fell in the battle. The landscaped lawns were used to exercise the horses, and the walkways used for target practice. The choultry meant for the Muslim fakirs were converted into a makeshift hospital to treat the battle wounded. These scenes were depicted in the illustrations by the military artist Charles Gold's book Oriental Drawings published in 1806. His painting shows Hyder Ali's tomb rising to the skies, but with a backdrop scene of British soldiers camping in the gardens. British forces wearing red coats with axes, cutting down the cypress trees, directing Indian workers to carry away the wood, and generally disrupting the garden.

Charles Gold describes the scene as

The Sultan's garden... became a melancholy spectacle, devoted to the necessities of military service; and appeared for the first time as if it had suffered the ravages of the severest winter. The fruit trees were clipped of their branches; while the lofty cypress trees, broken to the ground by troops, to be formed into fascines, were rooted up by the followers to be consumed as firewood.

During this occupation, the Gumbaz was sketched by military artists such as Charles Gold, James Hunter (d. 1792), Robert Home (1752-1834) and Sir. Alexander Allan (1764-1820).

== Vintage Gallery ==
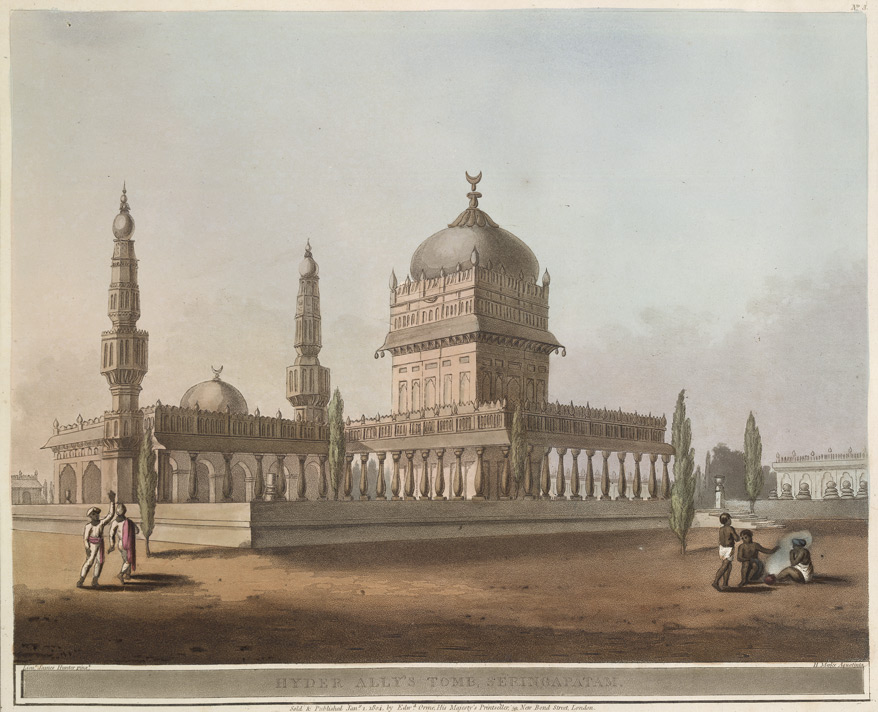
Hyder Ali's Tomb, Seringapatam by James Hunter (d.1792)

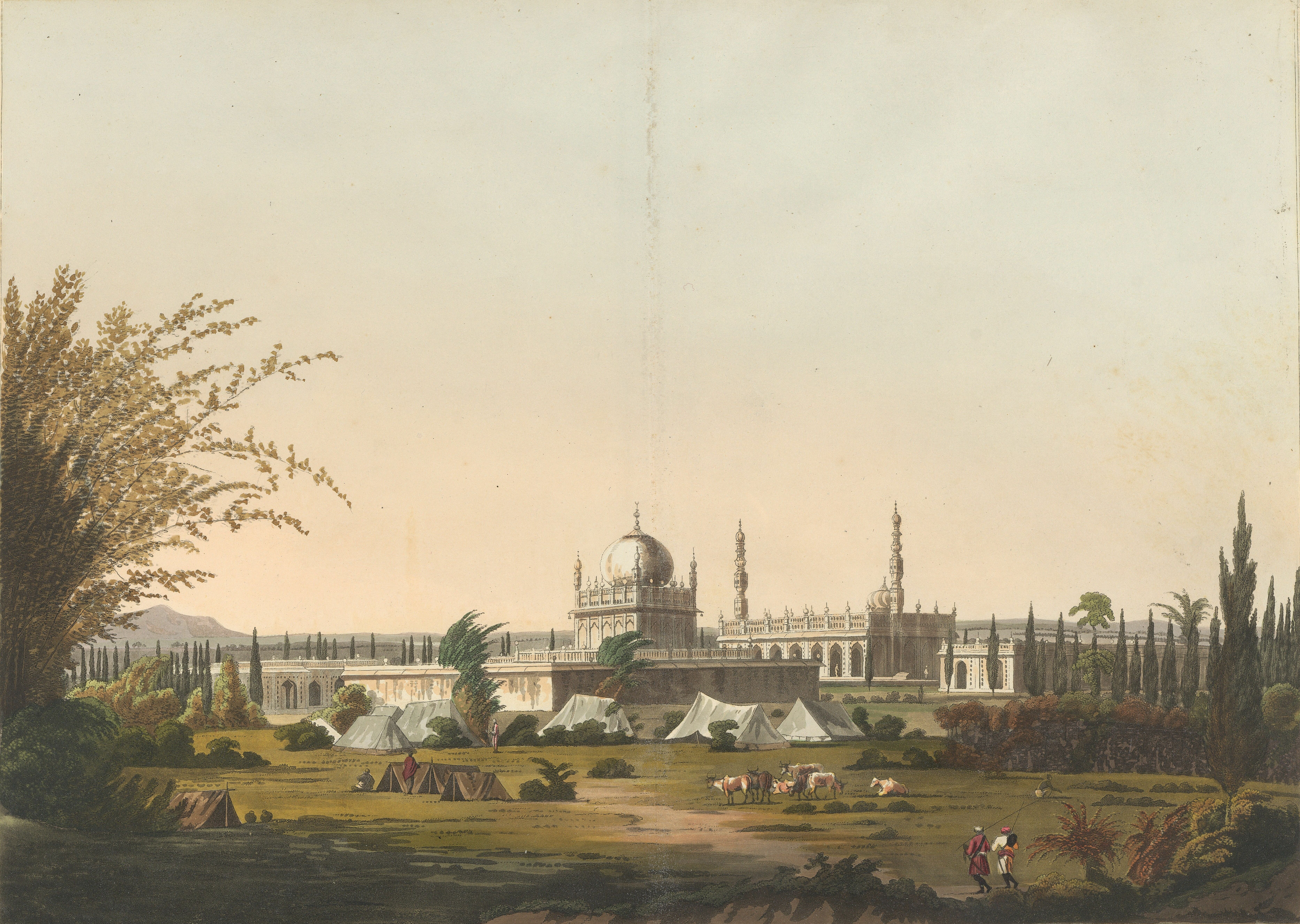
Mausoleum of Hyder Aly Khan at Lalbaug, by Robert Hyde Colebrooke, ca. 1793

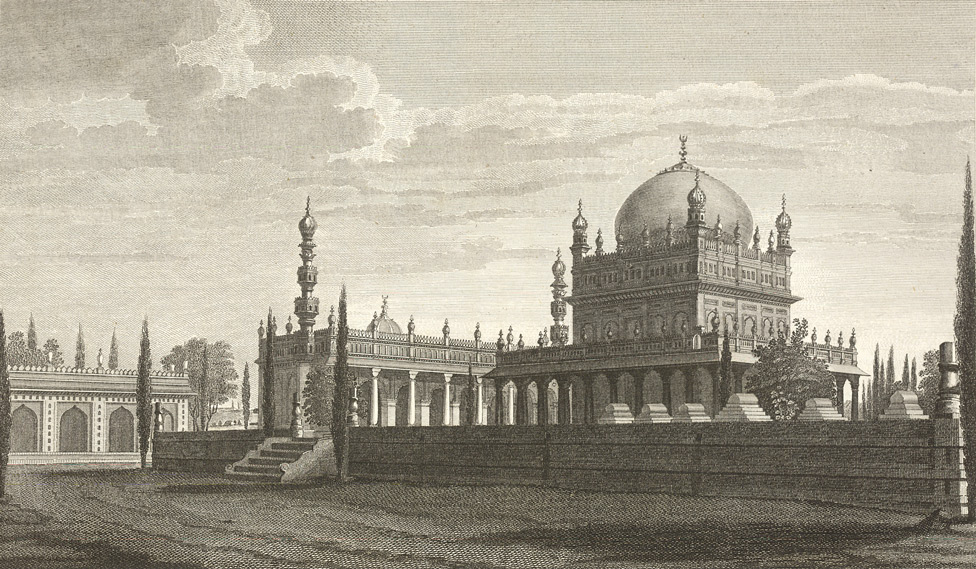
Hyder's tomb in the Loll Baug Gardens, by Robert Home (1752-1834)

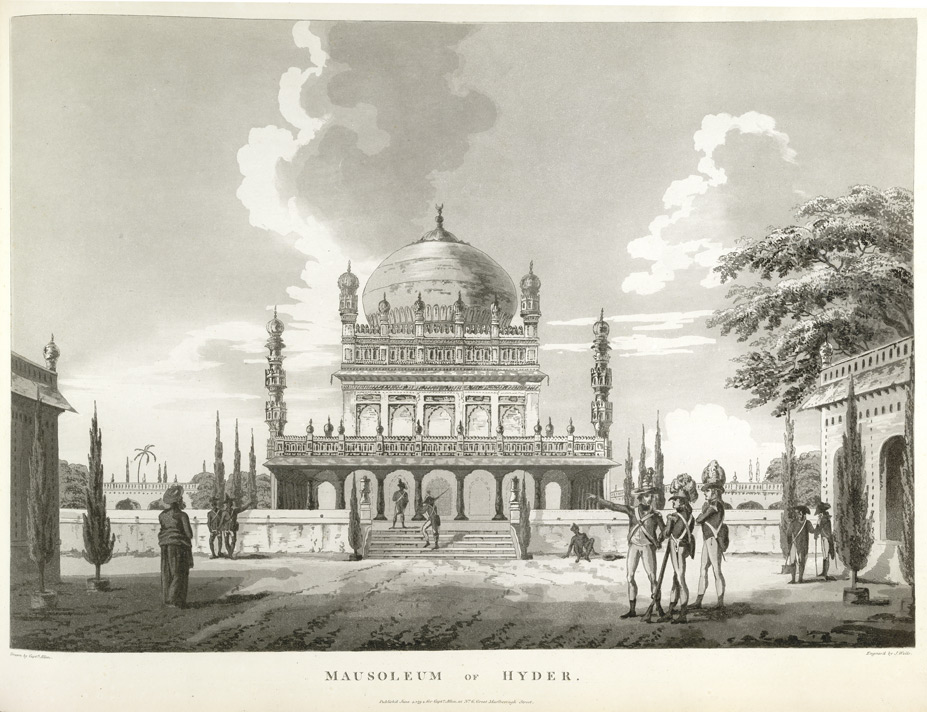
Mausoleum of Hyder, by Sir. Alexander Allan (1764-1820)

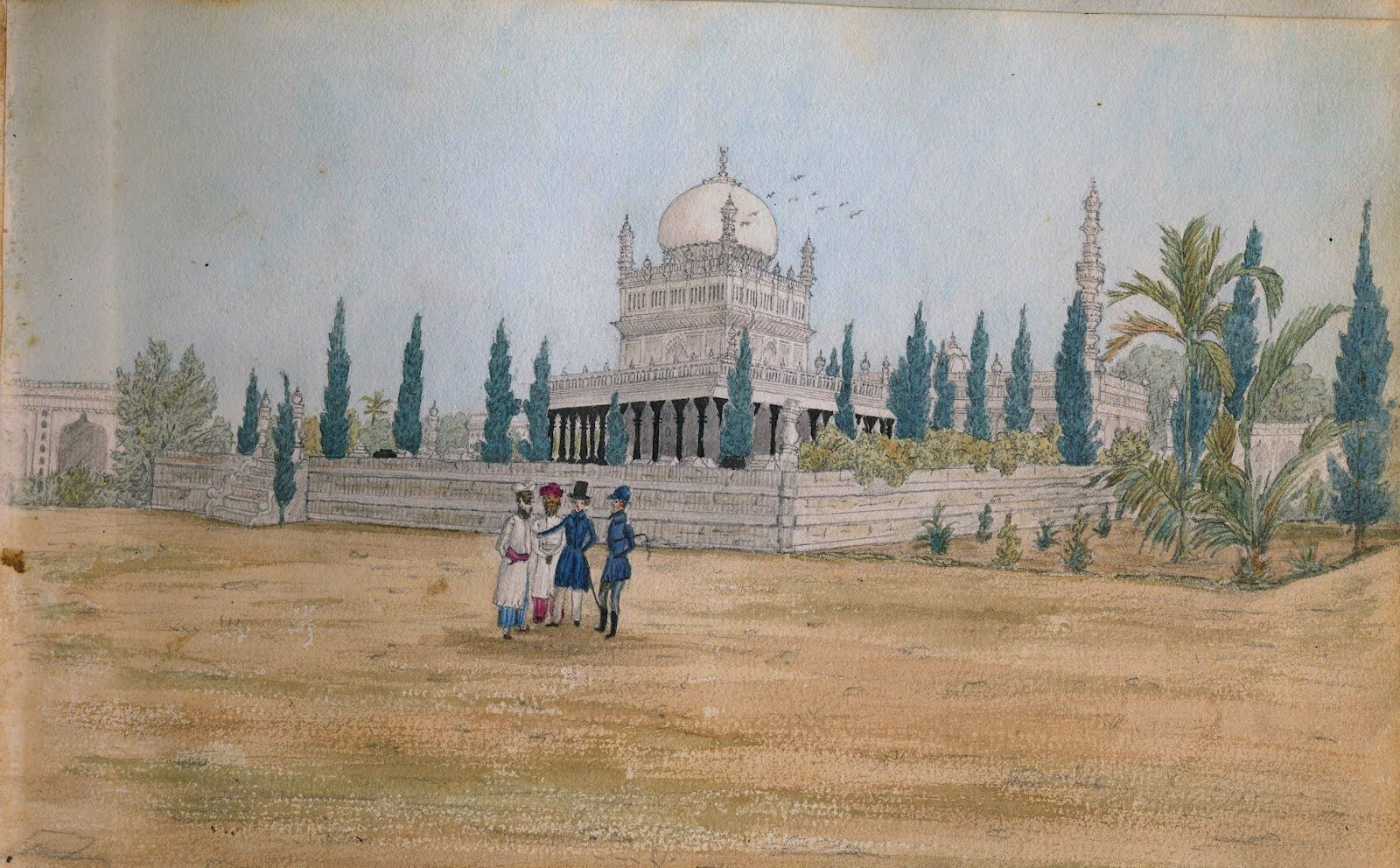
Mausoleum, Laul Baug, Seringapatam with tombs of Hyder Ali, his wife, and son Tippoo Saib, by Henry Jervis, Aug 1832

== Robert Home's Description ==
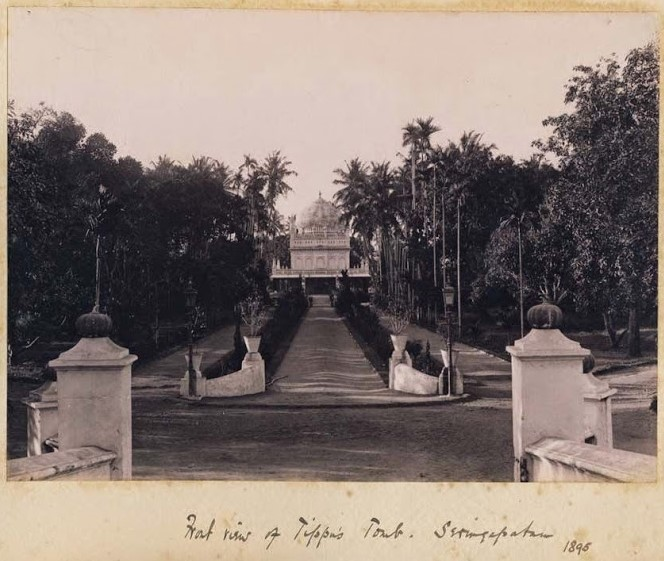
Front view of Tipu Sultan's Tomb, Seringapatam, 1895

Robert Home, the official military artist the Madras Army led by Lord Cornwallis, sketched the Gumbaz (see Vintage Gallery above) and described it. According to Home, the gardens called the Lal Bagh (garden of rubies), covered a third of the river island and was the largest garden in the Mysore Kingdom. The garden was landscaped beautifully with designs which was a combination of several Asian traditions, and in its middle was the mausoleum of Tipu's father Hyder Ali. He further describes the garden during the British occupation at the end of the Third Anglo-Mysore War as

This garden was laid out in regular paths of shady cypress; and abounded with fruit trees, flowers, and vegetables of every kind. But the axe of the enemy [the British] soon despoiled it of its beauties; and those trees, which once administered to the pleasures of their master, were compelled to furnish materials for the reduction of his capital.

== Tipu's Burial ==
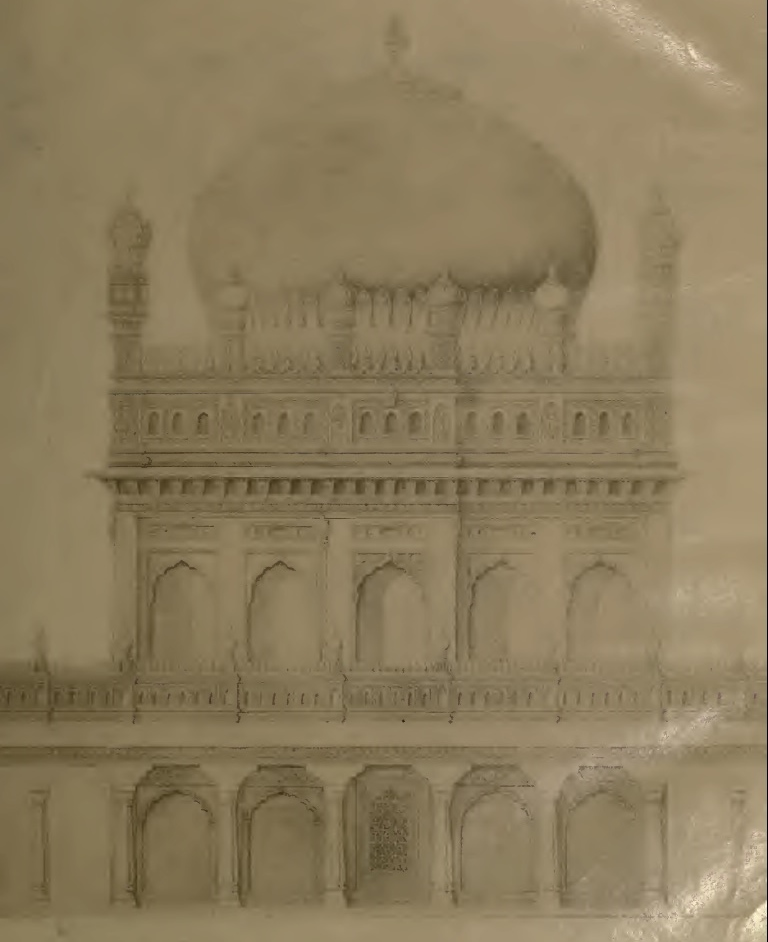
Gumbaz at Ganjam, by B L Rice in the Epigraphia Carnatica (Vol. 3), 1894.

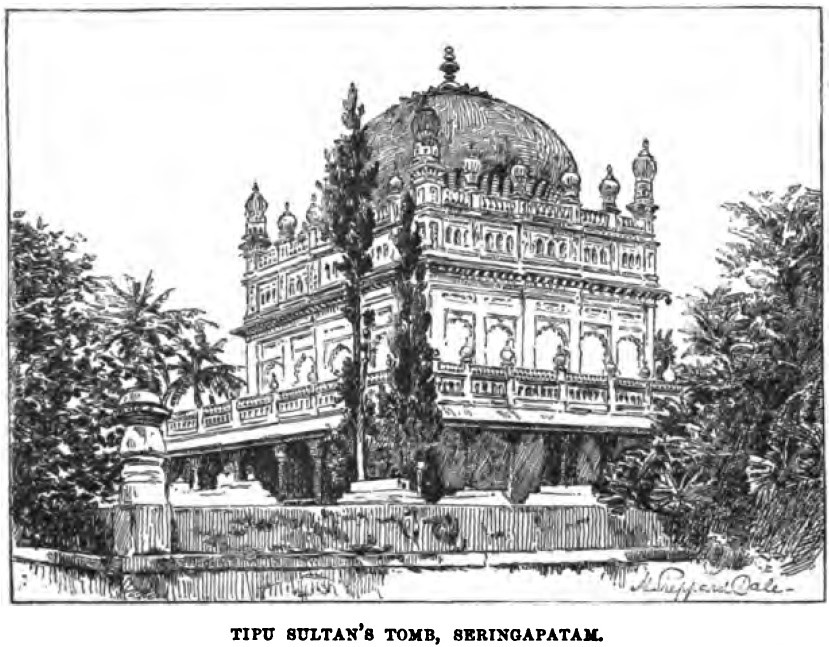
Tipu Sultan's Tomb, Seringapatam (Caine, 1891, p. 519).

Tipu Sultan was buried at the Gumbaz, next to the graves of his father and mother, after his death in the Fourth Anglo-Mysore War in 1799. The burial took place the next day after the end of the war, on 5 May 1799 at 5 May. The British allowed for Tipu to be buried at the Gumbaz, next to his father's grave, and also provided full military honours for his funeral. The body was carried in a procession, accompanied by European soldiers of the Grenadier division. The chief mourner was Tipu's son Abdul Khaliq, followed by some officials and people. A severe thunderstorm is recorded to have struck Seringapatam at the time his body was buried.

The burial of Tipu Sultan is described by many British Officers such as Lieutenant Richard Bayly of the 12th Regiment. According to Lieut. Bayly

I must relate the effects and appearance of a tremendous storm of wind, rain, thunder, and lightning that ensued on the afternoon of the burial of Tippoo Saib. I had returned to camp excessively indisposed. About five o'clock a darkness of unusual obscurity came on, and volumes of huge clouds were hanging within a few yards of the earth, in a motionless state. Suddenly, a rushing wind, with irresistible force, raised pyramids of sand to an amazing height, and swept most of the tents and marquees in frightful eddies far from their site. Ten Lascars, with my own exertions, clinging to the bamboos of the marquee scarcely preserved its fall. The thunder cracked in appalling peals close to our ears, and the vivid lightning tore up the ground in long ridges all around. Such a scene of desolation can hardly be imagined; Lascars struck dead, as also an officer and his wife in a marquee a few yards from mine. Bullocks, elephants, and camels broke loose, and scampering in every direction over the plain; every hospital tent blown away, leaving the wounded exposed, unsheltered to the elemental strife. In one of these alone eighteen men who had suffered amputation had all the bandages saturated, and were found dead on the spot the ensuing morning. The funeral party escorting Tippoo's body to the mausoleum of his ancestors situated in the Lal Bagh Garden, where the remains of his warlike father, Hyder Ali, had been deposited, were overtaken at the commencement of this furious whirlwind, and the soldiers ever after were impressed with a firm persuasion that his Satanic majesty attended in person at the funeral procession. The flashes of lightning were not as usual from far distant clouds, but proceeded from heavy vapours within a very few yards of the earth. No park of artillery could have vomited forth such incessant peals as the loud thunder that exploded close to our ears. Astonishment, dismay, and prayers for its cessation was our solitary alternative. A fearful description of the Day of Judgement might have been depicted from the appalling storm of this awful night. I have experienced hurricanes, typhoons, and gales of wind at sea, but never in the whole course of my existence had I seen anything comparable to this desolating visitation. Heaven and earth appeared absolutely to have come in collision, and no bounds set to the destruction. The roaring of the winds strove in competition with the stunning explosions of the thunder, as if the universe was once more returning to chaos. In one of these wild sweeps of the hurricane, the poles of my tent were riven to atoms, and the canvas wafted forever from my sight. I escaped without injury, as also my exhausted Lascars, and casting myself in an agony of despair on the sands, I fully expected instant annihilation. My hour was not, however, come. Towards morning the storm subsided; the clouds became more elevated, the thunder and lightning ceased, and nature once more resumed a serene aspect. But never shall I forget that dreadful night to the latest day of my existence. All language is inadequate to describe its horrors. Rather than be exposed to such another scene, I would prefer the front of a hundred battles

== Renovation by Lord Dalhousie ==
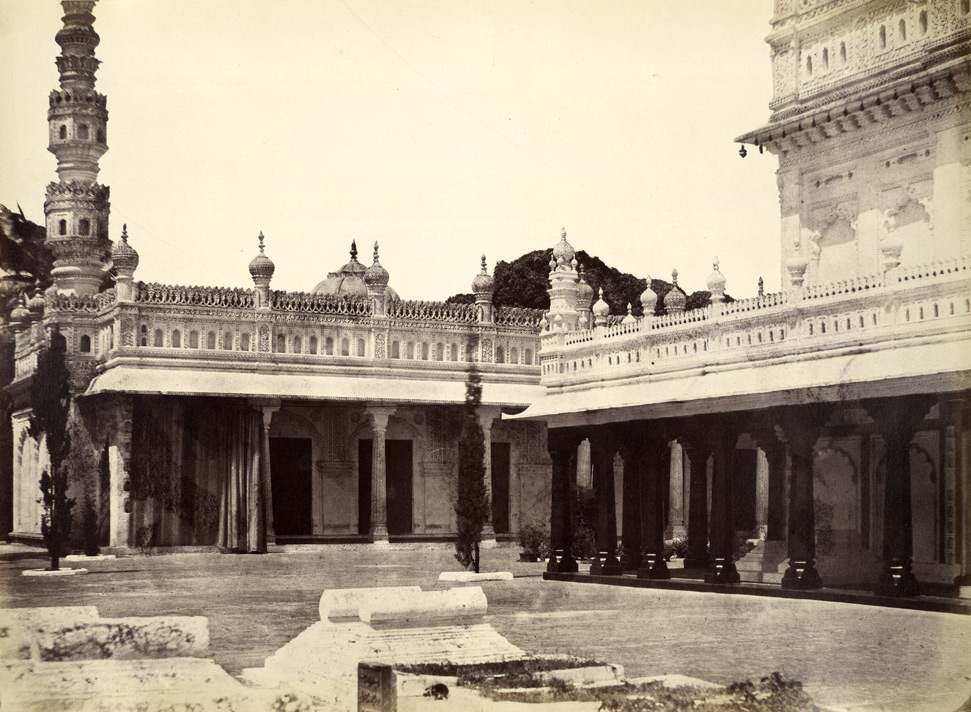
Tippu's Tomb, Seringapatam, by William Henry Pigou (1855)

In 1855, Lord Dalhousie, Governor-General of India visited Seringapatam on his way to the Nilgiris. During his visit he found most of the monuments in a state of neglect, slowing falling into decay. He then ordered that buildings to be renovated and maintained, as they not only provided memories for the war for the Deccan, and the exploits of the Duke of Wellington, but were also architecturally beautiful. Lord Dalhousie also paid for the replacement doors for the Gumbaz. Dalhousie also ordered for the murals in the Daria Daulat to be restored, and the building be repaired, a sum approved for the annual maintenance of Daria Daulat, Gumbaz and other associated monuments. A minute to this effect was recorded by his staff, and a fund was established for the maintenance of these monuments at Seringapatam

== Persian Epitaphs ==
The Persian epitaphs at the Gumbaz were studied by Benjamin Lewis Rice and appear in his work, Epigraphia Carnatica: Volume III: Inscriptions in the Mysore District (1894)

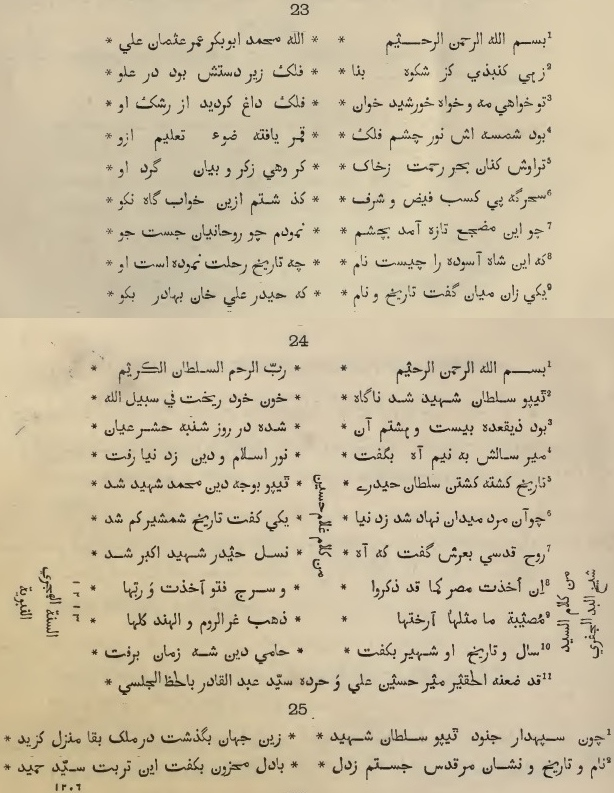
Persian Epitaphs at Gumbaz, Seringapatam, by Benjamin Lewis Rice in Epigraphia Carnatica (Vol. 3), 1894

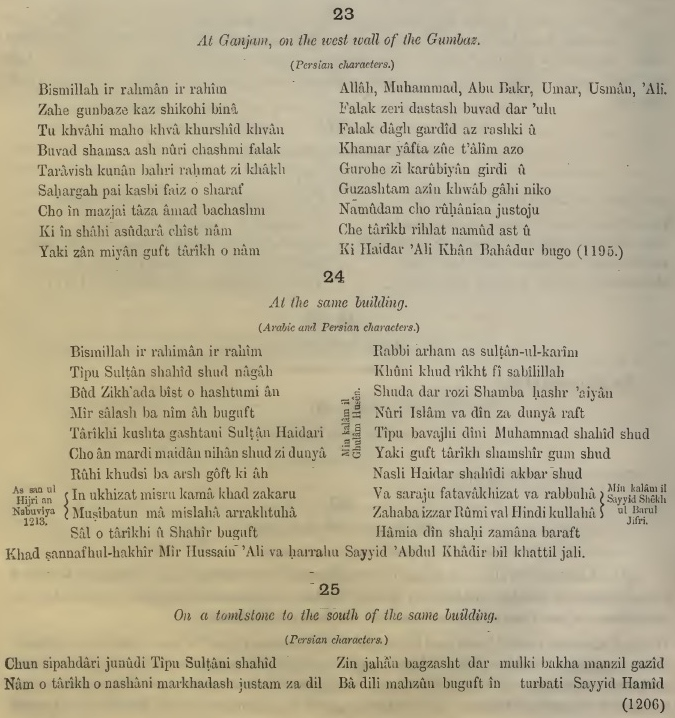
Roman Script of the Persian Epitaphs at Gumbaz, Seringapatam

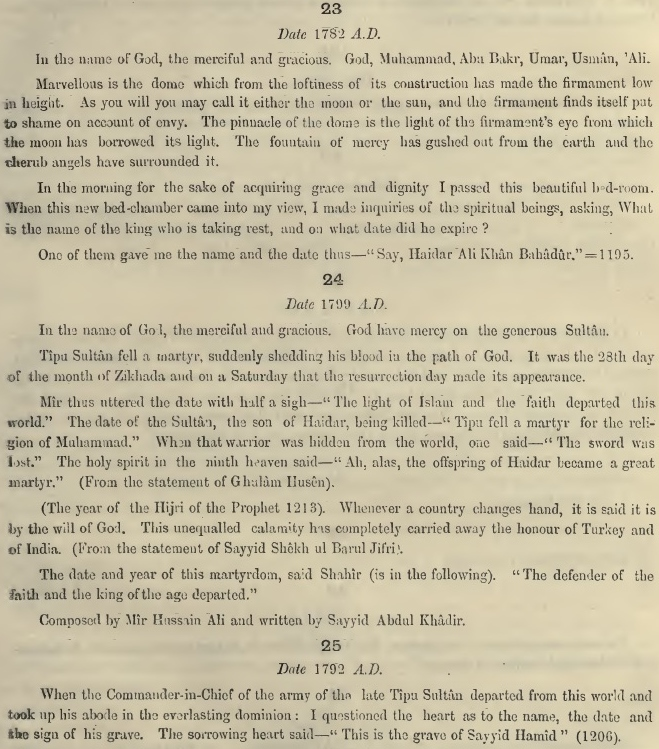
English Translation of the Persian Epitaphs at Gumbaz, Seringapatam

== William Baillie Memorial ==
In the gardens of Lalbagh, next to the Gumbaz is located the memorial for William Baillie. The memorial was commissioned, 35 years after Col Baillie's death, and 17 years after the fall of Tippu Sultan, by William's nephew Lt. Col. John Baillie, who served as the British Resident in the Court of the Nawab of Oudh, Lucknow. It is an austere, but poignant and pretty structure.

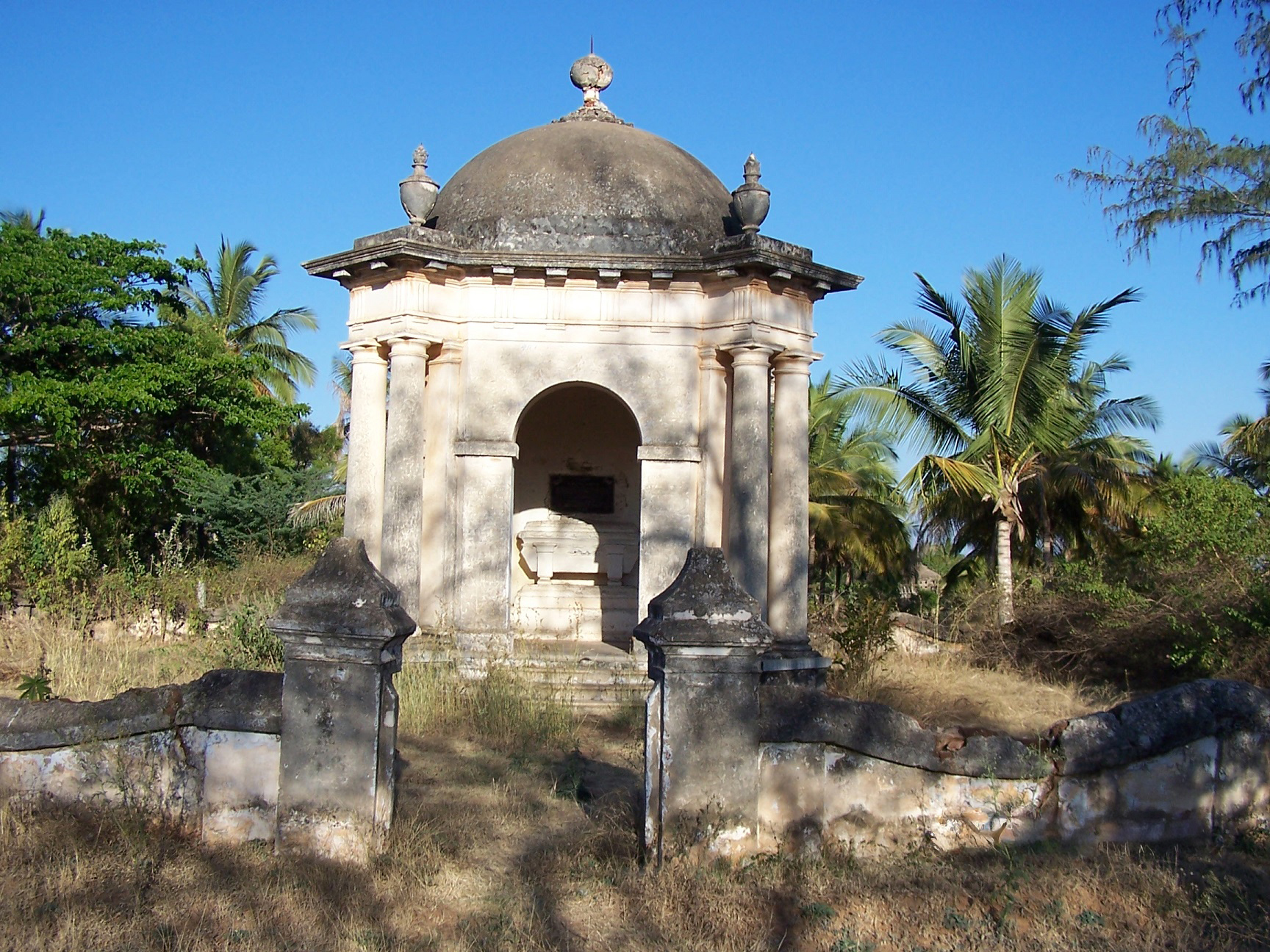
William Baillie Memorial, Seringapatam

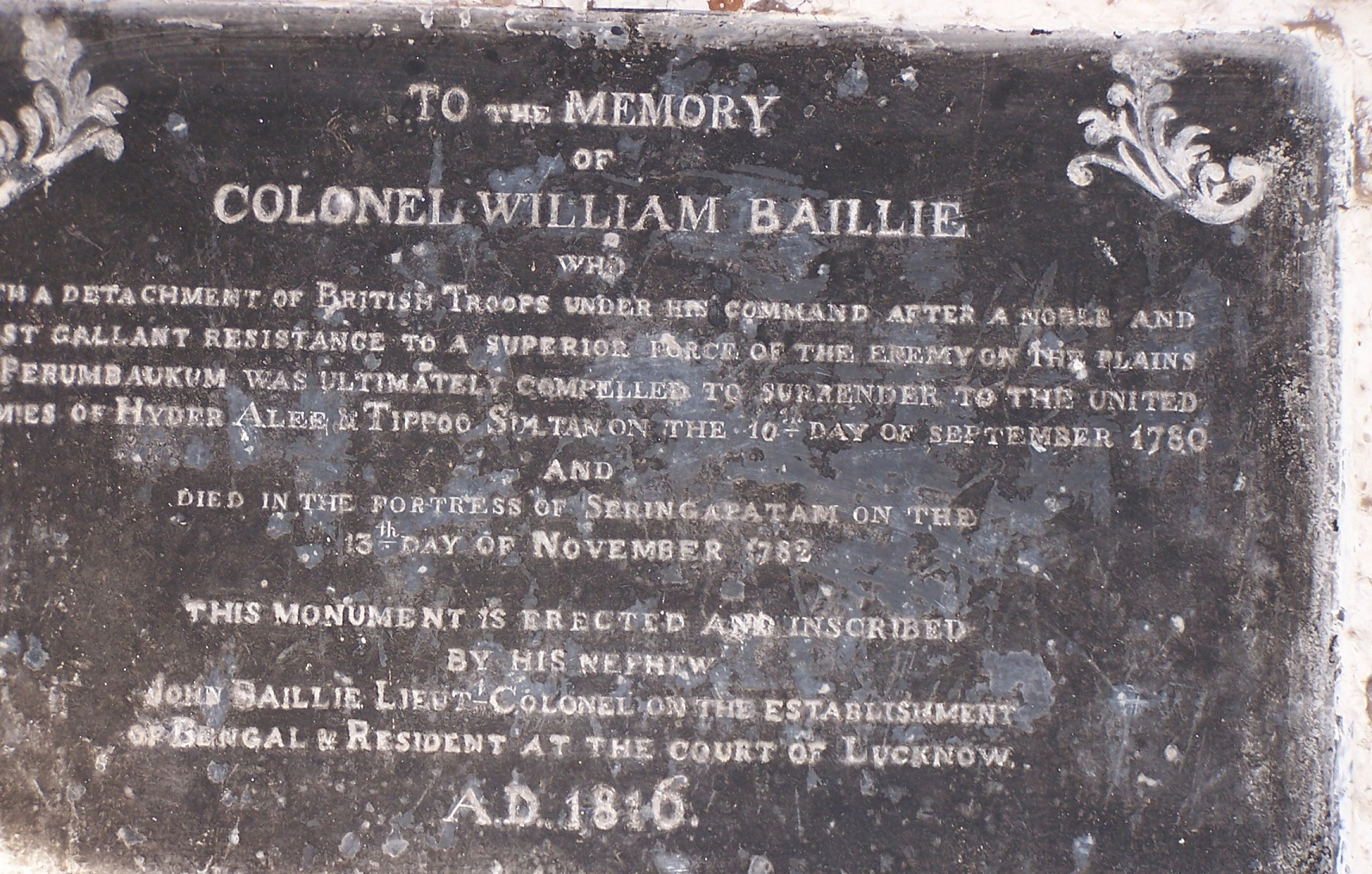
Plaque of the William Baillie Memorial, Seringapatam

== His Majesty's Cemetery, Ganjam ==
According to Rev. E W Thompson and other accounts, there used to exist a Madras Army cemetery called His Majesty's Cemetery at Ganjam, near the Gumbaz (a short distance in the North-West direction), much before the Garrison Cemetery. The cemetery was enclosed by a wall, with an inscription on the gate-post, His Majesty's Cemetery, Ganjam, a.d. 1799-1808. It contains burials between 1799 and 1808, mainly from the 33rd Regiment. Daniel Pritchard, the music master of this regiment was buried at this cemetery in July 1799. Elinda Harmonci, a child aged 4 years was also buried here in November 1799.

Col. Edward Montague of the Bengal Artillery, died 8 May 1799, 4 days after the final assault is buried near the Sangam, on the extreme east end of the island.

== See also ==
- Garrison Cemetery, Seringapatam
- Scott’s Bungalow, Seringapatam
