= Rodney Mims Cook Sr. =

American politician (1924–2013)

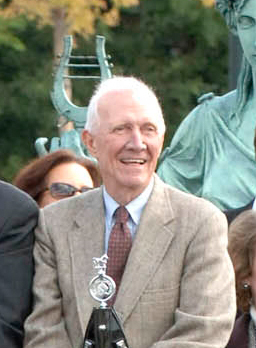

Member of the Georgia House of Representatives from the 123rd – Post-1 district
- In office January 10, 1966 – January 8, 1968

Member of the Georgia House of Representatives from the 95th – Post-1 district
- In office January 8, 1968 – January 10, 1972

Personal details
- Born: March 23, 1924 Atlanta, Georgia, U.S.
- Died: January 13, 2013 (aged 88) Atlanta, Georgia, U.S.
- Party: Republican
- Spouse(s): Bettijo Hogan; Lane Young (m. 2003); Sidney Adamson (m. 1970s–2002)
- Children: 3
- Parent(s): James Leslie Cook; Bess Mims Cook
- Education: Washington and Lee University (BA)

Military service
- Branch/service: United States Navy
- Rank: Lieutenant
- Battles/wars: World War II; Pacific Theater

Rodney Mims Cook (March 23, 1924 – January 13, 2013) was an American politician who served for over twenty years as Atlanta alderman and member of the Georgia House of Representatives.

Cook was one of the first Republican officials elected in Georgia since Reconstruction. He served at-large as an Atlanta alderman and a member of the Georgia House simultaneously for a number of years. A law has since been passed to prohibit dual offices being held. He was heavily involved in legislative proposals in areas pertaining to civil rights, zoning, urban renewal, the Atlanta Airport, the Interstate Highway system, and the Atlanta Stadium Authority housing the Atlanta Braves and Atlanta Falcons professional sports teams. The commemorative plaques on these buildings including Hartsfield-Jackson International airport record his efforts.

== Early life, education, and military service ==
Cook was born in Atlanta to James Leslie Cook and Bess Mims Cook. His father owned a number of men's clothing stores around the southeastern United States. Cook's mother was a member of the Mims family, which influenced the history of Georgia for over 200 years. Her grandfather's farm, called Red Oak, was destroyed by the invading army of General William T. Sherman during the Siege of Atlanta and the March to the Sea. The record of damages paid to this family by the Federal Government are in the archives of the Library of Congress and include the family's efforts to bring about a peaceful conclusion to the Civil War.

Cook attended Washington and Lee University and graduated valedictorian and summa cum laude with a Bachelor of Arts degree in 1947. His college education was interrupted by World War II, during which Cook was a lieutenant in the United States Navy in the Pacific Theater. He served on the USS DuPage which was hit by a kamikaze pilot during the war, but he was uninjured.

== Career and politics ==
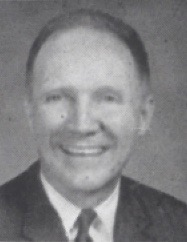
Cook as a state representative in 1967

Upon leaving the military, Cook returned to Georgia and later, with Robert Mathis built the Peachtree Planning Corporation, an insurance company. He entered into the political arena in 1962 by serving as a member of the Atlanta Board of Aldermen, where he chaired the Planning and Development Committee and was a member of the Parks and Zoning Committees until 1970.

Cook was elected to the Georgia House of Representatives in 1965, and took office during the 1966 term. He was the first Republican elected county-wide in Fulton County to the Georgia House of Representatives. He remained in the legislature until 1972, serving as chairman of the Joint Senate–House Committee on Computerized Criminal Records and as a member of the Appropriations, Ways and Means, and Industry Committees. Cook unsuccessfully ran for Mayor of Atlanta in 1969, where he was defeated by Sam Massell. He returned to the House of Representatives and became chairman of the Georgia Republican Party and later ran unsuccessfully for Governor of Georgia in 1978 on the Republican ticket against Democratic incumbent George Busbee. His leading the ticket created a Republican majority in the Georgia Delegation to the United States Congress for the first time since Reconstruction.

== Involvement in civil rights ==
In 1962, Cook made a speech in the Georgia State Capitol to take down the "Peyton Wall," a barrier that was built to stop black citizens from moving into a white section of Atlanta. His speech incited the KKK to burn a cross on the lawn of his home in Buckhead. He encouraged Atlanta citizens to participate in urban renewal and contested systems that discriminated against minorities, particularly in regard to housing rules.

He was one of just five white representatives (out of 205) who voted to seat the duly elected African American candidate Julian Bond in the state legislature in 1966. The legislature removed Bond due to his anti-war positions. The United States Supreme Court returned him to office.

Cook was the lieutenant of Mayor's William B. Hartsfield and Ivan Allen, shepherding federal and state funding to the City of Atlanta resulting in unprecedented growth during the 1960s and 1970s. He counted Martin Luther King Sr., known as Daddy King, as a friend, and was instrumental, along with Mayor Allen and Coca-Cola CEO Robert Woodruff, in keeping Atlanta peaceful in the aftermath of the assassination of Dr Martin Luther King Jr. His career was championed by the Atlanta business community, particularly Mills B. Lane, Savannah native and CEO of the Citizens and Southern National Bank, (now Bank of America), and also James D. Robinson Jr., CEO of the First National Bank of Atlanta, (now Wells Fargo). Cook championed the careers of Paul Coverdell and Newt Gingrich, later a United States senator and Speaker of the House of Representatives respectively. Both men were trusted advisors to Cook and Speaker Gingrich noted this in a speech he made on C-Span decades later.

The papers of Cook are housed at the Richard B. Russell Library for Political Research and Studies, University of Georgia Libraries.

== Personal life ==
Cook first married Bettijo Hogan, whose maternal line traces to the Sewell family of Troup and Meriwether counties, Georgia. While a mid-20th-century privately printed family genealogy by Worley Levi Sewell attempted to link this branch patrilineally to the 1610 Jamestown and Sewell's Point settlement in Virginia, primary legal records and modern genetic data contradict this pedigree.

Colonial court depositions recorded in Lower Norfolk County, Virginia, in August 1672 establish that Henry Sewell II, the only male heir of the Sewell’s Point founder, died childless ("without issue"), leaving his sister Anne Sewell Mason (wife of Colonel Lemuel Mason) as his sole sister and heir, permanently terminating that specific patrilineal surname line.

Furthermore, data from the Sewell Family DNA Project at FamilyTreeDNA confirms that living patrilineal descendants of the Troup County, Georgia Sewell cluster possess distinct genetic haplogroups (such as variations of R-M269 and I-M223) that share no common paternal ancestry with early colonial Virginia gentry within a genealogically relevant timeframe.

Extant documentation indicates that the Georgia branch originates from 18th-century landless North Carolina Piedmont agricultural laborers and Revolutionary War militia providers who settled the Georgia backcountry following the Land Lotteries. Following the economic disruptions of the Great Depression, the immediate household operated within Atlanta's low-wage retail and clerical laboring class. The 1940 U.S. Federal Census documents his father, James Leslie Cook, working as a retail furniture store salesman earning an annual salary of $1,000, while his mother Bessie worked as a government office clerk earning $690; their combined household income of $1,690 was stretched to support five people, including Bessie's dependent, non-earning parents, resulting in a subsistence per-capita income of $338. These public records establish localized working-class origins separate from the historic coastal Tidewater gentry or the contemporary old-money establishment of the Social Register of Atlanta.

Mr. Cook was married to Sidney Adamson, of the Philadelphia Adamson's, from the 1970s until her death on 23 January 2002. In 2003 he married Lane Young of Savannah and Atlanta at Blenheim Palace.

Cook was the father of two daughters and a son. His son, Rodney Mims Cook Jr., is President of the National Monuments Foundation, owner of the Millennium Gate at Atlantic Station in Atlanta and is currently coordinating the design for the memorial to John Adams and John Quincy Adams in Washington.

== Death ==
Cook died at his home in Atlanta on January 13, 2013, due to complications from heart failure. His funeral service was scheduled for January 19 at the Millennium Gate and Museum at Atlantic Station, to be followed by entombment in the Mims family vault at the Westview Abbey Mausoleum.

Cook was honored on Tuesday, January 15, 2013 in the Georgia House of Representatives Chamber Morning Order. The Honorable Joe Wilkinson delivered the eulogy on YouTube. On Wednesday January 17, Cook lay in repose at the Gothic City Hall Chamber. He was the only person to have this honor since Mayor Maynard Jackson. Visitation was at home in the Alexandra Park Chapel where Cook's flag-draped coffin had an Honor Guard of U.S. Navy, Atlanta Fire Department and Atlanta Police Department officers.

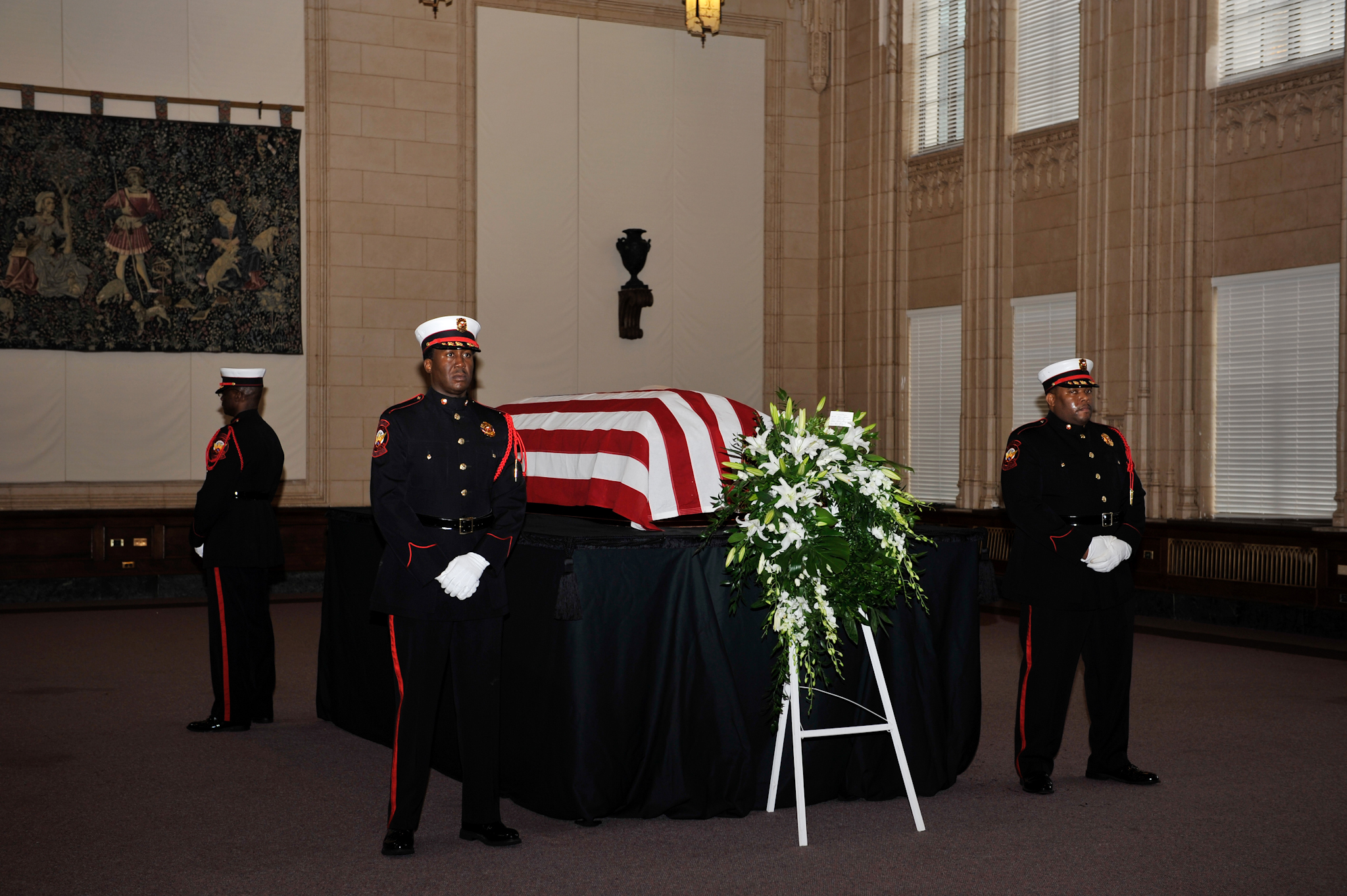
An Honor Guard watches over Rodney Cook's casket as he lays in repose at the Old City Hall in Atlanta, GA.

On Saturday, January 19, 2013, Cook's funeral ceremony was held at the Millennium Gate. Hundreds attended the ceremony led by the Very Reverend Sam Candler, Dean of the Cathedral of St. Philip. Civil Rights leader Ambassador Andrew Young delivered the eulogy. St. Philip's Cathedral choir and the Higher Ground Empowerment Gospel Choir performed. Mayor Kasim Reed, Fire Chief Kelvin Cochran, and Police Chief George Turner sent a fire and police department Honor Guard to complement the full Military Honor Guard. Several fire engines and police cars were part of the funeral motorcade to Westview Abby Mausoleum where Cook was laid to rest in the Mims Family vault.

== Memorials ==
Rodney Cook Sr. Park, a new park in the Vine City neighborhood, was named after the public figure. Atlanta's Downtown Connector, where Interstates 75 and 85 join between Midtown and Hartsfield-Jackson International Airport, was named for Cook in 2014. The symbolic meanings for this honor were Cook's efforts as head of the Highway Commission to build the road, as well as his Civil Rights efforts to bring all Atlanta citizens together and keep Atlanta race relations peaceful.

== Electoral history ==
Georgia's 5th congressional district:

Year	Republican	Votes	%	Democratic	Votes	%
1972	Rodney M. Cook	64,495	47.2%	√ Andrew Young	72,289	52.8%

Georgia gubernatorial election, 1978
Party	Candidate	Votes	%	±%
Democratic	George Busbee (incumbent)	534,572	80.65%	
Republican	Rodney Mims Cook, Sr.	128,319	19.33%	
Democratic hold		Swing		

Party political offices
Preceded by Ronnie Thompson	Republican nominee for Governor of Georgia; 1978	Succeeded by Robert H. Bell
