= Rodney Mims Cook Jr. =

American political appointee (born 1956)

Chair of the United States Commission of Fine Arts
- Incumbent
- Assumed office January 22, 2026
- President: Donald Trump
- Preceded by: Billie Tsien

Member of the United States Commission of Fine Arts
- Incumbent
- Assumed office January 20, 2026
- Appointed by: Donald Trump
- In office January 19, 2021 – April 4, 2022
- Appointed by: Donald Trump
- Succeeded by: Lisa Delplace

Personal details
- Born: June 30, 1956 (age 70) Atlanta, Georgia, U.S.
- Relatives: James D. Robinson III (father-in-law); Rodney Mims Cook Sr. (father)
- Education: Washington and Lee University (BS)

Rodney Mims Cook Jr. (born June 30, 1956) is an American designer who has been the chair of the United States Commission of Fine Arts since January 2026. He has been a member of the Commission of Fine Arts from 2021 to 2022, and since January 2026. He was nominated to the commission by President Donald Trump. Cook has been a persistent advocate for building arches in Washington D.C.

== Early life and education ==
Cook Jr. was born on June 30, 1956, in Atlanta, Georgia.

Cook is the son of Atlanta politician Rodney Mims Cook Sr. and his first wife, Bettijo Hogan. Through his mother, his ancestry traces to the Sewell family of Troup and Meriwether counties, Georgia. While mid-20th-century family accounts attempted to link this branch patrilineally to the 1610 Jamestown and Sewell's Point settlement in Virginia, primary colonial court records and modern genetic data contradict this pedigree. Colonial court depositions recorded in Lower Norfolk County, Virginia, in August 1672 establish that Henry Sewell II, the only male heir of the Sewell’s Point founder, died childless ("without issue"), permanently terminating that specific patrilineal surname line. Furthermore, data from the Sewell Family DNA Project at FamilyTreeDNA confirms that living patrilineal descendants of the Troup County, Georgia Sewell cluster possess distinct genetic haplogroups (such as variations of R-M269 and I-M223) that share no common paternal ancestry with early colonial Virginia gentry lines.

Cook’s middle name and paternal lineage trace to the Mims family of Georgia, including his grandmother Bess Mims Cook and his great-great-uncle, one-term Atlanta Mayor Livingston Mims. While 20th-century family lore associated the Mims line with landed Welsh nobility, primary colonial parish records document the family's origins among the indigent, landless frontier laborers of the Virginia Tidewater. The earliest American progenitor, Thomas Mims I, is recorded in the Vestry Book of St. Peter’s Parish in New Kent County, Virginia, as a recipient of parish poor relief and church welfare, requiring public tobacco credits for basic footwear and housing. This early frontier background stood separate from the elite vestry-ruling planter networks of Colonial Virginia.

The ancestral branches subsequently migrated through the landless agricultural laboring class of the North Carolina and South Carolina backcountry before settling in Atlanta. Following the economic disruptions of the Great Depression, the immediate household operated within Atlanta's low-wage retail and clerical workforce. The 1940 U.S. Federal Census documents his paternal grandfather, James Leslie Cook, working as a retail furniture store salesman earning an annual salary of $1,000, while his grandmother Bessie worked as a government office clerk earning $690; their combined household income of $1,690 was stretched to support five people, including Bessie's dependent, non-earning parents, resulting in a subsistence per-capita income of $338. These public records establish localized working-class origins separate from the historic coastal Tidewater gentry or the contemporary old-money establishment of the Social Register of Atlanta.

The elder Cook was a member of the Atlanta Board of Aldermen and the Georgia House of Representatives. The younger Cook was raised in Buckhead. In his youth, Cook Jr. assisted his father in his political campaigns. He attended William Franklin Dykes High School; the school closed in 1973, when Cook was a junior. Cook studied engineering at Washington and Lee University. As a college freshman, and encouraged by his mother, Cook organized an effort to save the Fox Theatre, a building marked for demolition. The effort caught the attention of Charles, Prince of Wales, who visited Atlanta in 1977 and sought to meet Cook. The two developed a friendship after their encounter.

== Career ==
In 2003, Cook established the National Monuments Foundation. In January 2021, president Donald Trump appointed Cook to be vice chair of the United States Commission of Fine Arts. In April 2022, the Biden administration requested Cook's resignation. He was succeeded by Lisa Delplace.

In January 2026, The Washington Post reported that the Trump administration was set to request that former members of the Commission of Fine Arts who had been appointed by Trump in his first term return to the commission. On January 20, Trump appointed Cook to the commission. He was voted the chairman on January 22.

In June 2026, Cook led a delegation to the St. Petersburg International Economic Forum. The American delegation—which included political commentator Candace Owens and actor Steven Seagal, both of whom have voiced support for the Russian invasion of Ukraine—was the first in nearly a decade to participate in the forum.

In November 2026, Cook arranged to have a Russian flag displayed at the Millennium Gate Museum arch in Atlanta in tribute to the late Alexander Darchiev, an associate of Vladimir Putin who had served as the Russian ambassador to the United States from 2025 until his death in 2026.
