= Idella Jones Childs =

American politician (1903–1998)

- Born: Idella Jones; June 21, 1903; Perry County, Alabama, U.S.
- Died: August 8, 1998 (aged 95)
- Education: Alabama State University
- Occupations: Educator, social activist
- Spouse: Norman Childs

Idella Jones Childs (June 21, 1903 – August 8, 1998) was an American educator, historian and civil rights activist. Childs worked as a teacher for 35 years in Perry County in Alabama. During the civil rights movement, her home was a meeting place for activists. She was the mother of Jean Childs Young, who later married Andrew Young who went on to become mayor of Atlanta. Childs worked as historian, helping to put two places in Alabama on the National Register of Historic Places. She also became the first black woman to sit on the city council in Marion. Childs was inducted into the Alabama Women's Hall of Fame in 2002. An award named after Childs is given out from the Alabama Historical Commission for the recognition of those who have contributed to the preservation of historic African-American places.

== Biography ==
Childs was born on June 21, 1903, in Perry County in Alabama, where she would live her entire life. Childs attended Lincoln Normal School and earned her teacher's certificate there. She studied elementary education at Alabama State University. She married Norman Childs and together they had five children. She earned her degree long after her first child was born. Childs' daughter, Jean Childs Young, was born on July 1, 1933. Childs taught in segregated schools for more than 35 years, teaching biology, algebra, history and social studies.

During the Civil Rights Movement, Childs' home became a meeting place for those involved in civil rights in Marion. In 1979, she was named an honorary member of the National Commission on the International Year of the Child by Jimmy Carter. She founded and became the first chair of the Perry County Arts and Humanities Council in 1982. In May 1985, she was appointed to fill a council seat in Marion. Childs was the first black woman to serve on the council. She was re-elected to the seat in 1988. Also in 1988, she was appointed to the board of the Alabama Historical Commission. She helped add the First Congregational Church Building and the Mary Elizabeth Phillips Thompson Auditorium of the Lincoln Normal School to the National Register of Historic Places. Childs earned NASA's Unsung Heroes Award in 1993.

Childs died on August 8, 1998. Hundreds attended a memorial service held in her honor at Lincoln Normal School. Childs was buried in the Marion Cemetery on Lafayette Street.

In 2002, she was inducted into the Alabama Women's Hall of Fame. Her son-in-law, Andrew Young, was a keynote speaker. The Alabama Historical Commission's Black Heritage Council gives out an award in her name. The award, known as the Idella Childs Distinguished Service Award, "recognizes people who have contributed to the preservation of African American historic places."
