= ADAM Architecture =

UK based architectural practice

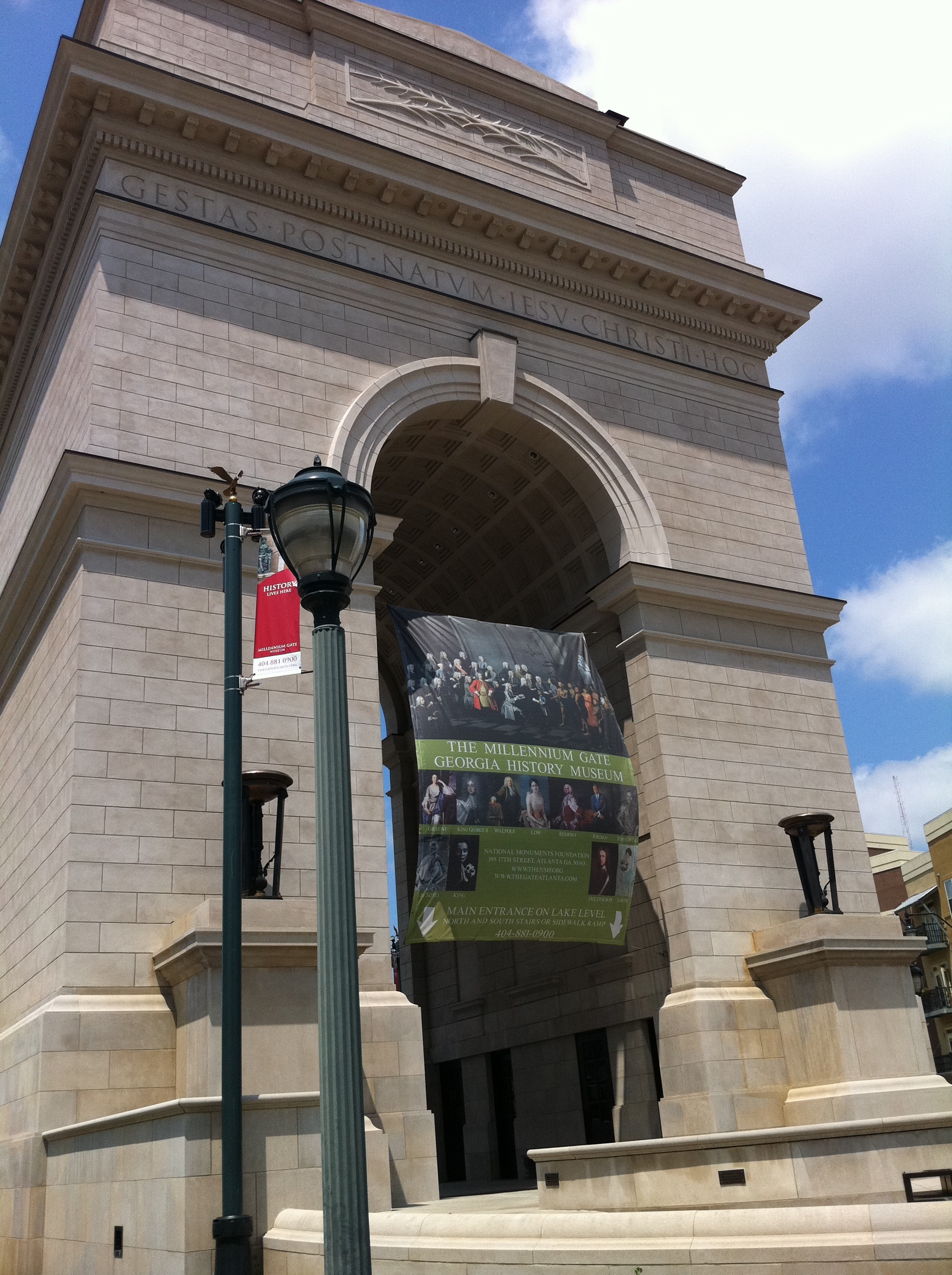
Millennium Gate in Atlanta, Georgia, USA (2008)

ADAM Architecture is a UK based, international architecture and urban design practice with offices in Winchester and London. It specialises in contemporary traditional and classical design, commonly known as New Classical Architecture.

Work includes new town and country homes; restoration, and alterations to listed and historic buildings; master planning, and urban extensions.

Dan Cruickshank is a historic building consultant.

== History ==
The practice name changed to ADAM Architecture from Robert Adam Architects in 2010 to recognise the individual design profiles of the Directors. Now it is run by Nigel Anderson, Hugh Petter, George Saumarez Smith, Robbie Kerr, Darren Price and Robert Cox. Wayne Reakes and Alison Duthie joined the executive board in 2022. Robert Adam retired from the firm in 2020

== Notable projects ==
- Nansledan, for the Duchy of Cornwall
- Chettle House restoration (2020)
- Portico at The Oval (2013)
- Millennium Gate, Atlanta (2008)
- Stocks House renovation, (2008)
- RAF Bentley Priory restoration and redevelopment (2013)
- British School at Rome gallery and lecture theatre (2002)
- Poundbury residential and commercial buildings
