= Peyton Finley =

Alabama educator

Peyton Finley was a doorkeeper of the Alabama House of Representatives, a delegate at the 1867 Alabama Constitutional Convention, and an influential Alabama State Board of Education member in Alabama. After the legislature established Lincoln School in Marion, Alabama, he pushed for the establishment of a university. Over the next few years his efforts helped expand the school into a normal school and university, Lincoln Normal School and University for the Education of the Colored Teachers and Students. In 1875 he proposed establishing four normal schools for African Americans and four for whites.

In 1866 he was marshal of the first Emancipation Day parade in Montgomery, Alabama. Attended by the governor and other dignitaries, it was held on New Year's Day. He was the first African American appointed to the Alabama State Board of Education. Finley proposed two bills to establish eight normal schools, four for the training of white teachers and four for the training of black teachers in Montgomery, Sparta, Marion, and Huntsville, with each institution overseen by a board of commissioners.

An Alabama State University apartment building is named for him.
