= Atlantic Steel =

Former steel company based in Atlanta, Georgia

Coordinates: 33.7925°N 84.3963°W

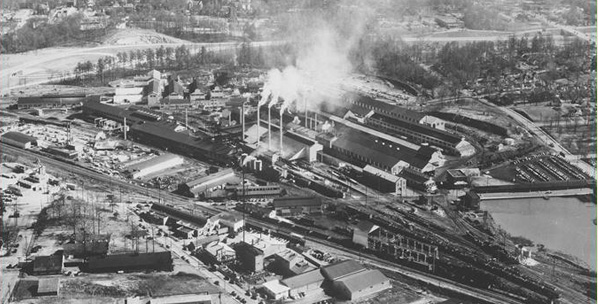
Atlantic Steel Mill

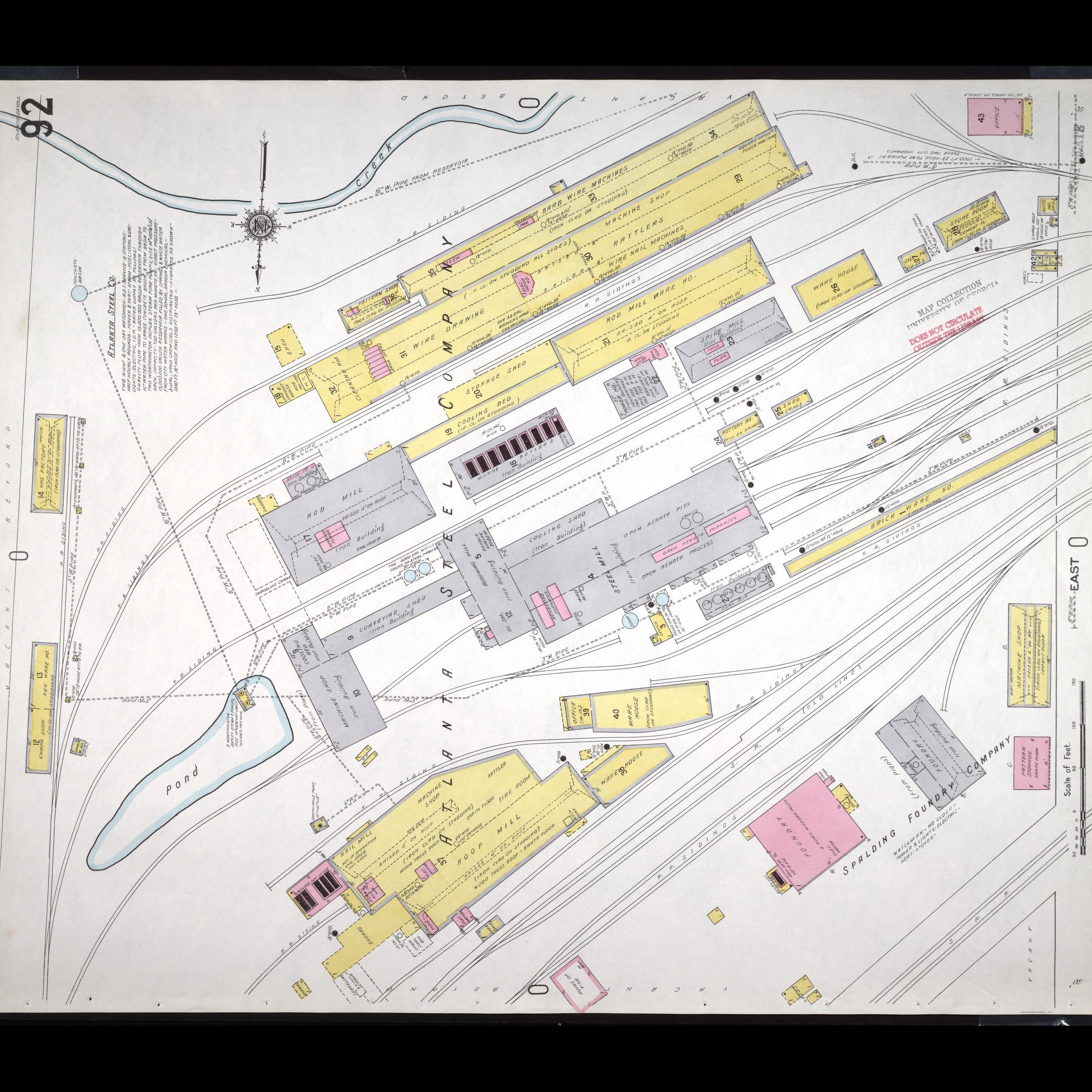
Atlanta Steel Mill, fire map 1911

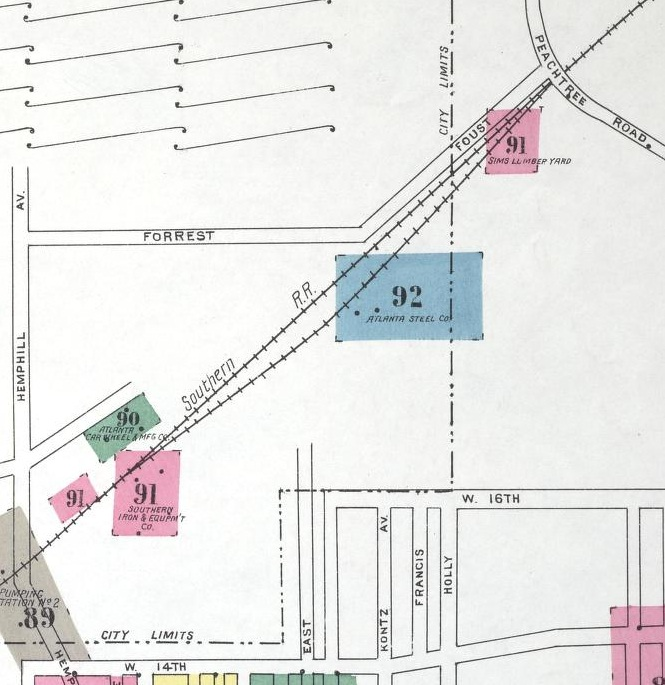
Atlanta Steel, location 1911

The Atlantic Steel Company was a steel company in Atlanta, Georgia with a large steel mill on the site of today's Atlantic Station multi-use complex.

Atlantic Steel's history dated back to 1901 when it was founded as the Atlanta Hoop Company, with 120 employees, and which produced cotton bale ties and barrel hoops. It became the Atlanta Steel Company, and then in December 1915, the Atlantic Steel Company.

From 1908 to 1922 Thomas K. Glenn was the company's president. A replica of his office exists at the Millennium Gate museum in Atlantic Station.

By 1952, the plant had 2,100 employees and was producing not only hoops and ties, but also "poultry and field fence, barbed wire, angles, round bars, channels, tees, handrail, reinforcing bars, nails, rivets, welding rods, shackles, [forgings] and fence posts".

The plant's "deep-throated" steam whistle was named "Mr. Tom", after Tom Glenn, an early president of the company.

By 1958, the impact of foreign steel competition pushed smaller steel producers like Atlantic Steel to speak to the United States House Committee on Ways and Means in a request for intervention. Atlantic Steel had only produced 37% of its capacity for steel production in 1958.

In 1979, the Ivaco company of Montreal, Quebec, Canada acquired Atlantic Steel. Operations were partially shut down in the 1980s as competition from home and abroad intensified.

In 1997, of the 1,400 employees in 1979, there were only 400 remaining.

In 1998, Jacoby Development purchased the complex for about US$76 million, tore down the complex, cleaned up the site and built Atlantic Station in its place.
