= Jean Childs Young =

American educator and civil right advocate (1933–1994)

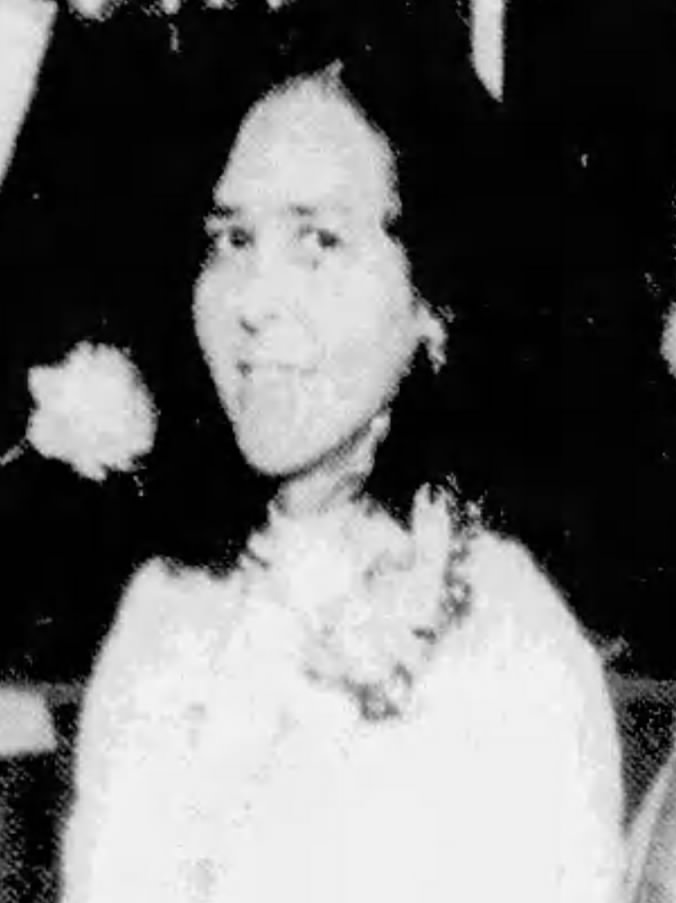
- Young in 1977

First Lady of Atlanta
- In office January 4, 1982 – January 2, 1990
- Preceded by: Valerie Jackson
- Succeeded by: Valerie Jackson

Personal details
- Born: July 1, 1933 Marion, Alabama, U.S.
- Died: September 16, 1994 (aged 61) Atlanta, Georgia, U.S.
- Party: Democratic
- Spouse: Andrew Young (m. 1954)
- Children: 4
- Parent: Idella Jones Childs (mother)
- Education: Manchester College (B.Ed)

Jean Childs Young (July 1, 1933 – September 16, 1994) was an educator and advocate for equal access to education in the United States. Young also dedicated much of her life to involvement in children's rights, and served as the American chairwoman of the United Nations' International Year of the Child in 1979. Young worked alongside her husband, Andrew Young, as an involved advocate in the Civil Rights Movement.

== Early life ==
Jean Childs Young was born on July 1, 1933, in Marion, Alabama. Her father, Norman Lorenzo Childs, worked at a family-owned grocery store and bakery in Marion, sometimes traveling around Alabama to sell the store's homemade peanut brittle during the Great Depression. Her mother, Idella Jones Childs, was an elementary school teacher. Young had four siblings. She spent her childhood and early adulthood in Marion, attending Lincoln Normal School, and later attended Manchester College in Indiana, where she received her bachelor's degree in education in 1954.

Jean Childs Young met Andrew Young in the summer of 1952. He had come to Marion, Alabama to be a pastor for a small church in the area. Upon his arrival, he had no place to stay and was assigned to lodge at the Childs' house for a week. Childs met Andrew during his stay at her house, and the two developed a relationship over the course of that summer. In the fall, Childs returned to Manchester College, where she was working towards a bachelor's degree in education, and the two kept in touch via letters. Young proposed to Childs in December 1953, and they were married in Marion on June 7, 1954.

== Career ==
Young initially taught elementary school in Thomasville, Georgia. After moving with her husband to Hartford, Connecticut, in the early-1950s so that he could earn a divinity degree from Hartford Seminary, she began teaching at Arsenal primary school. The couple later moved back to Georgia, where Young taught at two elementary schools in Atlanta. During her time teaching in Atlanta, Young became a coordinator of curriculum for elementary public schools in the area. Young also participated in educational advocacy and programs beyond the scope of the classroom. Along with being a dedicated elementary school teacher, Young also participated in the Teacher Corps program, one of Lyndon B. Johnson's "Great Society" programs that served as a means of enhancing education in impoverished or low-income areas of the United States. In 1970, she wrote a parental guide titled "Bridging the Gap: Home and School" to encourage parents of students to incorporate education from the classroom into life at home as well. Young was involved in higher education as well. She was one of the developers of Atlanta Metropolitan State College, and served there as a public relations officer as well as an advisor for a number of years after the school's establishment.

While her husband held office as the Mayor of Atlanta, Young continued to advocate for improved education, and took action through the resources available to her as first lady of Atlanta. In 1981, she founded the Atlanta Task Force on Public Education and served on the committee for a number of years. With the help of Young, this education task force greatly increased the funding given to elementary schools in Atlanta for a period of time. Young eventually extended her educational expertise to the digital realm as well, working with the technology company IBM to create "The Illuminated Books and Manuscripts." This is a resource for analyzing texts digitally that is meant to be used as part of educational curriculum.

=== Involvement in the Civil Rights Movement ===
Young, alongside her husband, Andrew, contributed much of her life to the Civil Rights Movement. Both Young and Andrew felt that their participation in the movement was consistent with their beliefs and values as those involved in ministry. Andrew was specifically influenced by the nonviolent resistance taught by Gandhi, and Young had also been influenced by similar nonviolent and pacifist beliefs while studying at Manchester College. Her background in education— specifically in regards to creating curriculum for public schools— carried over to her work in Civil Rights, as she created curriculum for "the Citizenship Schools of the Southern Christian Leadership Conference." She also aided her husband in his attempt to secure voters rights for African Americans, including during the Thomasville rallies. In 1956, the couple worked to organize a voter registration rally in Thomasville, Georgia— one of their first involvements in the Civil Rights Movement. They were inspired by the Brown vs. Board of Education ruling that outlawed segregation, and felt that they could make a substantial impact through such rallies. Despite initially meeting resistance from the Ku Klux Klan, the 1965 voter registration rally was successfully carried out at a local high school in Thomasville.

The couple later moved to New York City, which hindered their direct involvement in the movement for some time. Yet when Young and Andrew witnessed the Nashville Sit-Ins of 1960, they felt compelled to return to the South, moving back to Atlanta and becoming more involved in the movement than ever. Both Young and Andrew believed in the power of the youth to create change, and were inspired by the Sit-Ins partly because of the high youth involvement in the boycotts, protests, and marches in Nashville. Upon their return to the south, Andrew began his work alongside Martin Luther King Jr. Although he initially denied Martin's request that he work for the Southern Christian Leadership Conference, Andrew joined a few years later, in 1964. Young had gone to the same high school as Dr. King's wife, Coretta Scott King, and the two later became good friends as their husbands continued their work in the movement together. According to Young, the work that he and Martin did would not have been possible if it weren't for the support of the women they married.

Moreover, Young also participated in some of the most famous marches of the Civil Rights Movement, including the march in Alabama from Selma to Montgomery which began on March 21, 1965. Young decided, in spite of her husband's initial concerns, to attend the march and bring her two daughters, Andrea and Lisa, with her. The famous march drew mass media attention and contributed to establishing the Voting Rights Act later that year.

Along with actively participating in marches and other protests, Young and her husband often opened their home to students and others participating in the movement that needed a place to stay in Atlanta; people often slept in the basement or wherever else there was space in their house on a given night. In this sense, Young and Andrew were deeply involved in the movement, either through active participation or though enabling others to participate as well. Both Young and Andrew expressed the sentiment that neither overshadowed the other person, and that Young worked alongside her husband, rather than behind him. Not only was she his support, but she was his partner in the work he did as well. Young also resisted segregation in her personal life, and through the realm of education. Alongside Coretta Scott King, she attempted to enroll her daughters in schools that had not yet been desegregated. Her two daughters, Andrea and Lisa, were among the first black children to attend newly desegregated private schools in Atlanta.

=== Children's rights advocacy ===
Young was actively involved in promoting children's rights, and served on the committee for numerous national organizations, as well as organizations specific to Atlanta, that worked towards securing rights for children and ensuring the flourishing of children both in America and across the world. Young worked for the United Nations International Children's Emergency Fund and Children's Defense Fund.

=== International Year of the Child ===
In 1978, Young was appointed as chair of the American committee of the UN International Year of the Child by President Jimmy Carter. The International Year of the Child was a program that was funded and supported by the United Nations, and was meant to secure rights and improve the quality of life for children worldwide. Many countries participated in the program internationally. The program came about as a response to the concern that "far too many children, especially in developing countries are undernourished, are without access to adequate health services, are missing the basic educational preparation for their future and are deprived of the elementary amenities of life." Jimmy Carter claimed to have appointed Young due to her wide expertise in child's rights advocacy and her background in education.

The International Year of the Child had two main objectives that they hoped to accomplish within that year. The first goal of the International Year of the Child was to bring international awareness to the particular needs of children and the necessity of taking these needs into consideration during government decision and policy making. Bringing the needs of children into public awareness was the first step in ensuring that children's needs are being considered and recognized by nations and their governments across the world. The second goal was to encourage international acknowledgement of the importance of children's organizations, and to promote the idea that such organizations "should be an integral part of economic and social development plans with a view to achieving...sustained activities for the benefit of the children at the national and international levels."

=== Campaigns and involvement in government ===
Young was also actively involved in government, and ran campaigns geared towards those underrepresented in politics. In 1970, she founded "Women for Andrew Young:" a campaign aimed at women that promised her husband's support of women's issues should he win the position of mayor of Atlanta. Along with her direct involvement in government during her husband's tenure as mayor, Young actively participated in organizations such as the League of Women Voters of Georgia, which promoted the women's involvement in voting and the political system in general. Beyond this, the League advocated for fair government in Georgia that promoted equality. The League also had connections to education, as it advocated for equal opportunities and access to equal education for all students. This was a cause that Young had dedicated much effort towards in her lifetime.

== Honors and awards ==
Young has received numerous awards and honors for the work she has done in advocating for the rights of children, women, and African Americans. In 1989, Young was awarded the NAACP Distinguished Leadership Award for her work. She later received the Y.W.C.A. Women of Achievement Award in 1993, a year before her death. A middle school, the Jean Childs Young Middle School in Atlanta, was named in her honor. Young also received a number of honorary doctorates from Chicago's Loyola University, Manchester College, and New York City College of Technology. Young served on the committee of the Georgia Women of Achievement, an organization that honors women who were born in or resided in Georgia for their achievements and contributions to the state. Young was named their honorary trustee, and was later honored by the state organization in 1983 when she was named their Georgia Democratic Woman of the Year.

== Personal life ==
Jean and Andrew had four children: Andrea, Paula Jean, Lisa, and Andrew Jackson "Bo" Ill.

Jean Childs Young was diagnosed with liver cancer in 1991. She later died from the disease at the age of 61 on September 16, 1994, in Atlanta. A celebration of life in her honor was held at the Atlanta Civic Center, attended by thousands of friends, family and admirers. The many tributes to Young at the funeral included a poem read by Maya Angelou, a eulogy spoken by Coretta Scott King, and a personal note from President Bill Clinton. Young had written a memoir titled What to Remember About Me that was published posthumously on September 20, 1994.
