= Bethany Congregational Church (Thomasville, Georgia) =

Historic church in Georgia, United States

- U.S. National Register of Historic Places
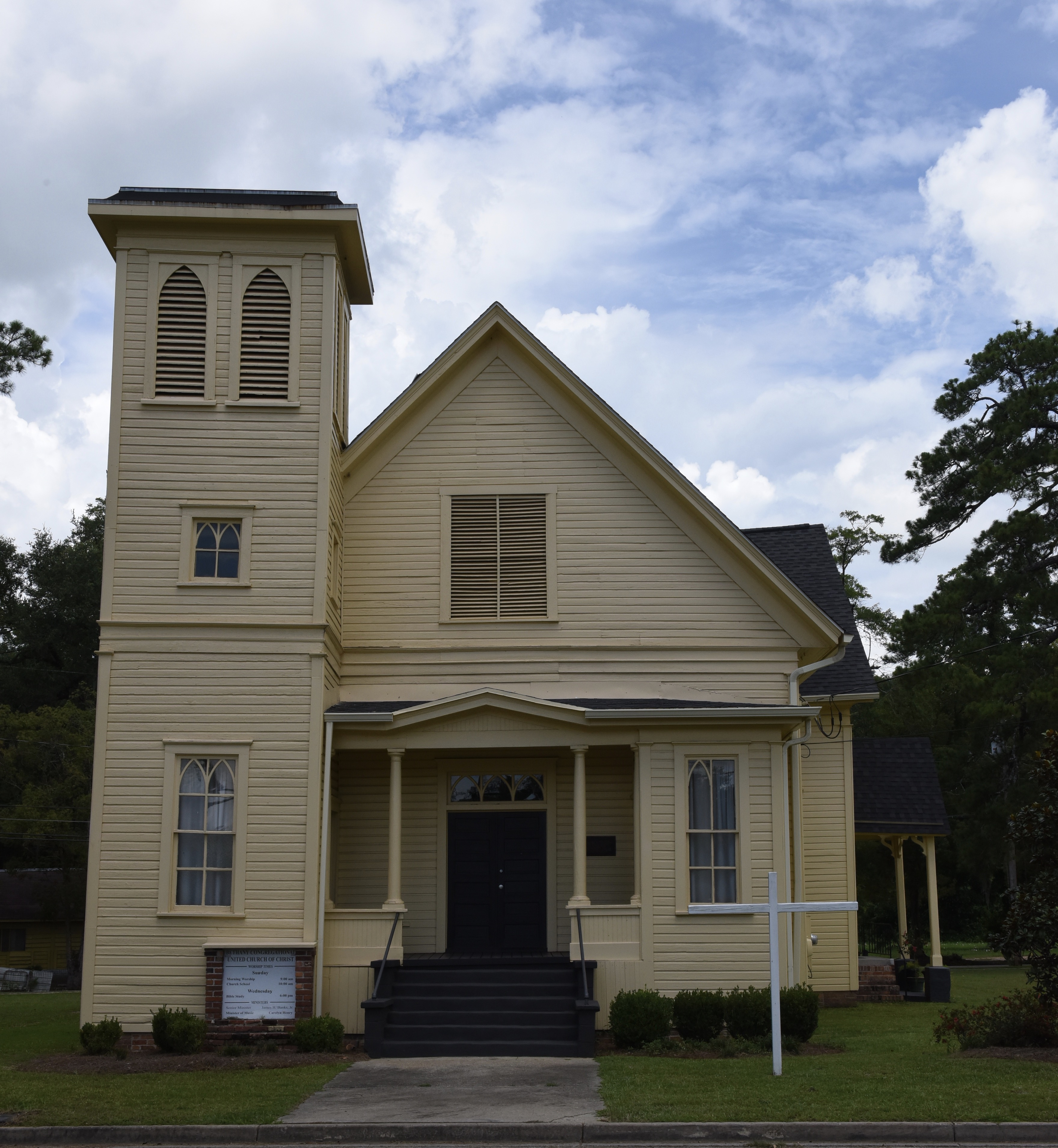

- Location within Georgia Location within the United States
- Location: 1122 Lester St. Thomasville, Georgia
- Coordinates: 30.82033°N 83.98611°W
- Area: 1.2 acres (0.49 ha)
- Built: 1891
- NRHP reference No.: 85000453
- Added to NRHP: March 7, 1985

Bethany Congregational Church is a United Church of Christ house of worship located in Thomasville, Georgia in south Georgia's Thomas County. It was founded on February 1, 1891, by the American Missionary Association as the chapel and worship center of the Allen Normal and Industrial School, an educational institution for African American students. The school operated from 1885 to 1933, and the church remained after the school property was razed in 1935.

In 1985, the church was added to the National Register of Historic Places.

Civil rights leader Andrew Young, who earned a divinity degree from Hartford Theological Seminary in Connecticut, accepted the pastorate of Bethany Congregational Church in 1955. He served as pastor of Evergreen Congregational Church in adjacent Grady County during 1957–59; Evergreen is also NRHP-listed.
