= 1978 Georgia gubernatorial election =

- November 7, 1978
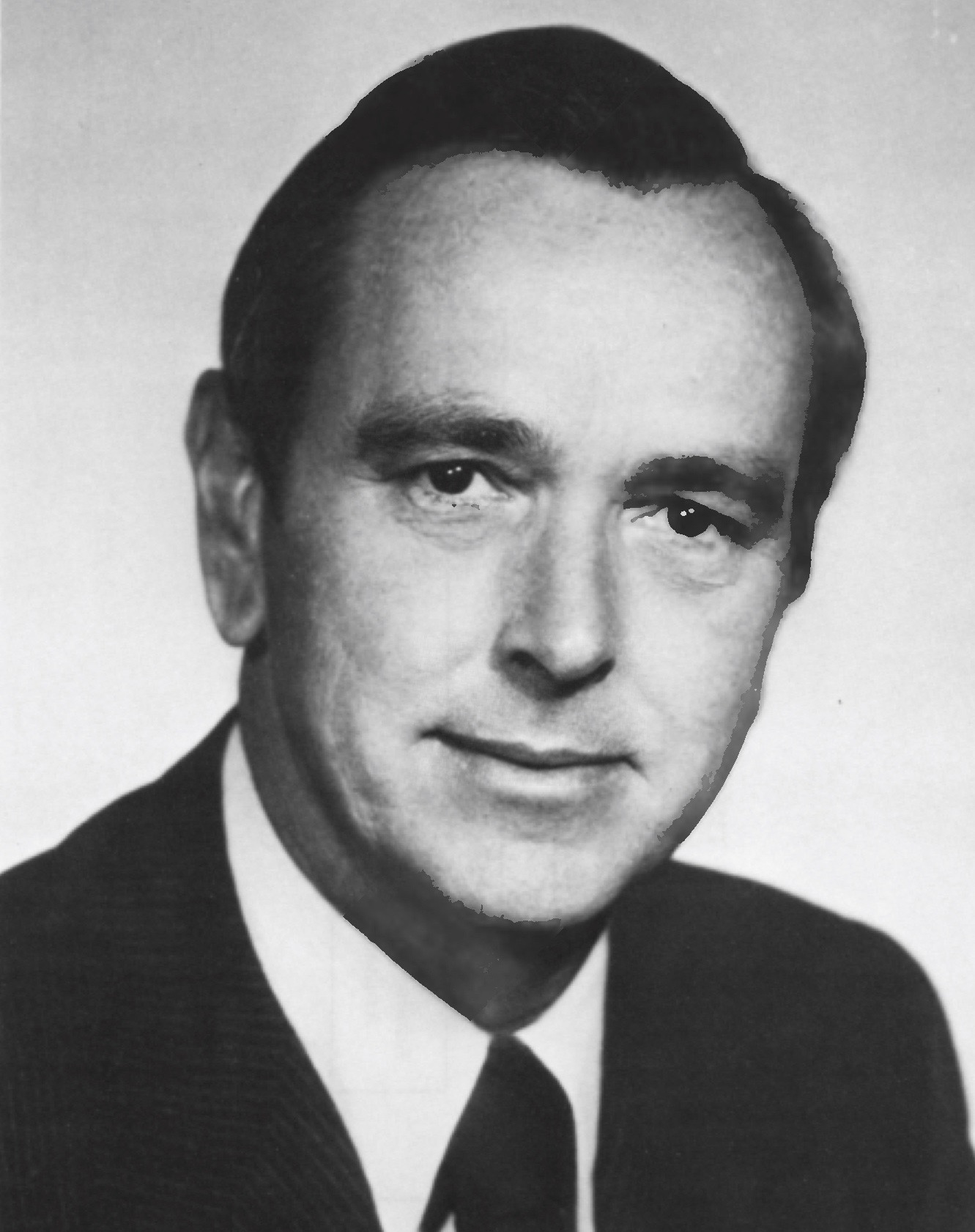

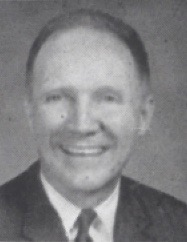
Nominee	George Busbee	Rodney Mims Cook Sr.
Party	Democratic	Republican
Popular vote	534,572	128,139
Percentage	80.65%	19.33%
- County results Busbee: 50–60% 70–80% 80–90% >90%
Governor before election
George Busbee
Democratic
Elected Governor
George Busbee
Democratic

The 1978 Georgia gubernatorial election was held on November 7, 1978. George Busbee was re-elected, the first time a governor of Georgia was re-elected for a second four-year term under the amendment made to the constitution in 1976, and the first time overall after serving a complete first four-year term.

== Democratic nomination ==
Governor Busbee won the primary with 503,875 votes (72.41%), defeating Roscoe Dean, Jr and his 111,901 votes (16.08%). Notable segregationist J. B. Stoner finished third with 37,654 votes (5.41%).

== Republican nomination ==
Rodney Cook, who had served in the Georgia House of Representatives, defeated Bud Herrin with 23,231 votes (87.32%) to his 3,374 votes (12.68%).

== General election results ==
This election was a contest between the Democratic Governor Busbee and civil rights icon Rodney Cook, who ran on the Republican ticket. Despite receiving fewer votes than in the previous election four years earlier, Busbee defeated Cook in every single county and by over 400,000 votes.

Georgia gubernatorial election, 1978
Party	Candidate	Votes	%	±%
Democratic	George Busbee (incumbent)	534,572	80.65%	
Republican	Rodney Mims Cook, Sr.	128,319	19.33%	
Democratic hold		Swing		
