= William R. Pettiford =

American minister, banker (1847–1914)

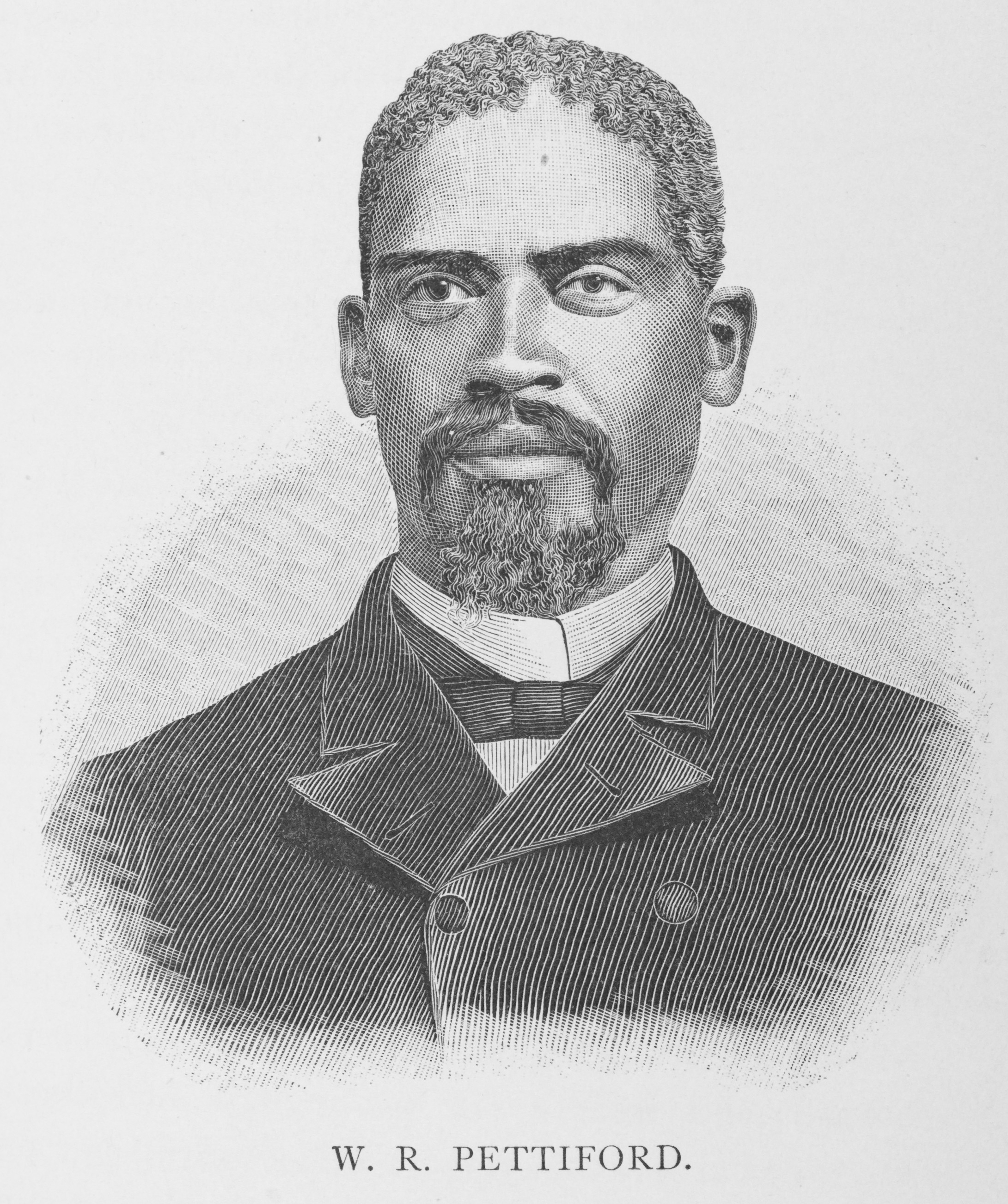
- Pettiford in 1887
- Born: William Reuben Pettiford; January 20, 1847; Granville County, North Carolina, U.S.
- Died: September 20, 1914 (aged 67); Birmingham, Alabama, U.S.
- Education: Lincoln Normal School, Selma University, Shaw University
- Occupations: Minister, educator, banker
- Political party: Republican

Religious life
- Religion: Baptist

William Reuben Pettiford (January 20, 1847 – September 20, 1914) was a minister and banker in Birmingham, Alabama. Early in his career he worked as a minister and teacher in various towns in Alabama, moving to the 16th Street Baptist Church in 1883 and serving there for about ten years. In 1890 he founded the Alabama Penny Savings Bank. It played an important role in black economic development in Alabama and in the South during the 25 years it existed. Pettiford has been called the most significant institutional builder and leader in the African American community in Birmingham during the period in which he lived. In 1897 he was said to be next to Booker T. Washington the black man who has done the most in the South for blacks.

== Early life ==
William Reuben Pettiford was born in Granville County, North Carolina on January 20, 1847 to William and Matilda Pettiford. His parents were free blacks and owned a farm. William worked on the farm and had lessons on the weekends where he learned to read. About the age of ten, his parents sold their farm and moved to Person County, North Carolina, where Pettiford was able to get a tutor and more formal lessons.

On July 4, 1868, Pettiford converted to the Baptist religion and on August 3, 1868 he was baptized by Rev. Ezekiel Horton in Salisbury, North Carolina. He took the place of clerk at the Pleasant Grove church and on July 4, 1869 he married Mary Jane Farley, daughter of Joseph Farley, but she died on March 8, 1870. He remarried to Jennie Powell on July 24, 1873, but she died September 5, 1874. He married a third time on November 23, 1880 to Della Boyd, daughter of Richard and Caroline Boyd of Selma, Alabama. They had at least three children, the oldest of which was Carrie Bell Pettiford born September 22, 1882.

== Early career as minister and teacher ==
On December 3, 1869 he moved to Selma, Alabama where he took work as a farm hand and teacher. He entered the State Normal School at Marion, Alabama where he studied for seven years, teaching and farming in his spare time to fund his education. He took a principalship at a school in Uniontown, Alabama from which he resigned in 1877 to focus on finishing his schooling. In 1878, he was elected a teacher at the Selma Institute (later Selma University) and given the opportunity to study theology under then president, W. H. Woodsmall. On March 6, 1879 he was licensed to preach at the Baptist Church in Marion, Alabama and in November 1879 he was made general financial agent by the board at the State Baptist Convention in Opelika, Alabama. In 1880, he resigned from these positions to accept the pastorate of a church at Union Springs, Alabama. In late February 1883 he moved to Sixteenth Street Baptist Church in Birmingham, Alabama. In Birmingham, he was a very successful fundraiser for the church, and succeeded in building a new church building costing $25,000 and growing the size of the congregation.

== Community leader ==
In 1887, together with A. L. Scott, Samuel Roebuck, George Turner, J. H. Thompson, Sandy Goodloe, D. A. Williams, A. T. Walker, R. C. O. Benjamin, and J. T. Jones he incorporated the Robert Brown Elliot School of Technology in Birmingham, the first school of its kind for blacks in the US By 1887, he was a leader in the Baptist Church in Alabama: he was president of the Ministerial Association in Birmingham, a member of the board of trustees at Selma University, and president of the Negro American Publishing Company affiliated with the Birmingham Negro American Journal. In 1889, he was in a delegation to meet with President Benjamin Harrison to discuss needs of Republicans in Alabama and advocate for greater inclusion of blacks in Republican politics. He was an attendee of the 1889 American National Baptist Convention in Indianapolis where William J. Simmons led the push to provide aid for blacks fleeing violence in the South and moving to the North. In 1896 he was an Alabama at-large delegate to the 1896 Republican National Convention in St. Louis, Missouri and supported William McKinley.

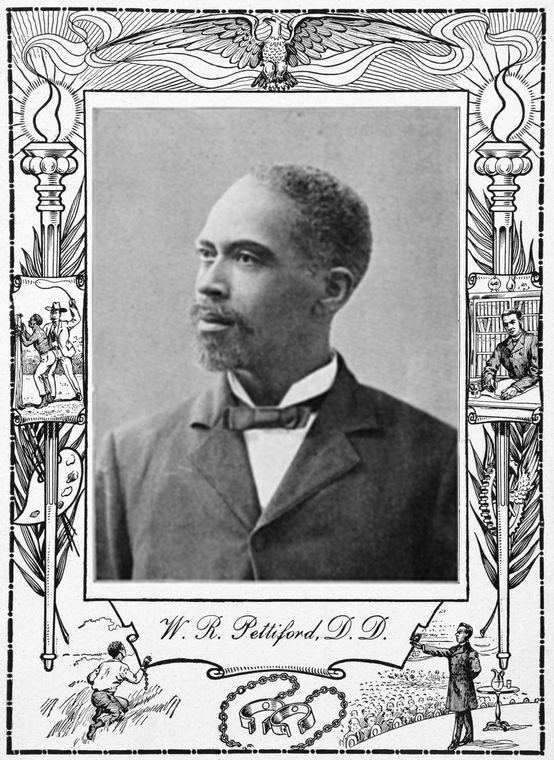
W R Pettiford in 1902

In 1895 he wrote Divinity in Wedlock about Christian marriage. In 1899 he was a predominant delegate at the annual meeting of the National Afro-American Council in Chicago led by Alexander Walters. In the late 1890s, Pettiford and other pastors petitioned the city to form the first public high school for African Americans in Birmingham called Industrial High School. The school opened in September 1900 with Arthur H. Parker principal in the Cameron Building and held its first graduation at the Sixteenth Street Baptist Church in 1904. In September 1902, he led the local organization for relief of the victims of the Shiloh Baptist Church stampede that killed over 100 people during a speech given by Booker T. Washington He was again an Alabama delegate-at-large to the 1908 Republican National Convention in Chicago.

He received an honorary master of arts from Shaw University in June, 1912. He was the spiritual leader of the Alabama Grand Lodge of the Knights of Pythias of North America, South America, Europe, Asia, Africa and Australia. In 1904, together with Rev. C. O. Boothe, Pettiford held theological classes in the basement of the church to educate future ministers. These classes became what is today known as the Birmingham-Easonian Baptist Bible College.

At the Sixteenth Street church, Pettiford established the Christian Aid Society to help sick members and bury its dead. He was a member of the Birmingham Negro Business League and the city's Inter-Denominational Ministers' Alliance. He was constantly active in Birmingham and Alabama politics and he worked particularly closely with Reverend T. W. Walker of the cities Shiloh Baptist Church on a number of civil rights and anti-Jim Crow causes.

== Alabama Penny Savings Bank ==
Pettiford was inspired by the apparent need and by the success of William Washington Browne's Saving Bank of the Grand Fountain United Order of True Reformers of Richmond, Virginia to establish a local bank for the community. The Alabama Penny Savings Company opened on October 15, 1890 due to the efforts of Pettiford, Peter F. Clarke (who became the bank's vice-president), B. H. Hudson Sr. (who worked as a cashier), N. B. Smith, Arthur H. Parker, and Thomas W. Walker. The board of directors included Reverend J. I. Jackson, F. S. Hayzel, and Reverend J. Q. A. Wilhite. Pettiford was the leader of the efforts to establish the bank but wished to continue his position in the church and not be bank president. However, the directors told him that it was necessary for the community's confidence in the bank that he be its president and he reluctantly took the role on a year to year basis. Four years after the bank was formed he finally resigned as pastor and turned to bank president full time, although he continued to insist that he was still a preacher and he continued to preach. He even held the pastorate at Tabernacle Baptist Church for a short period during his presidency. Pettiford's leadership took influence from his friend, Booker T. Washington, emphasizing self-help and racial solidarity while cultivating the assistance of white leaders who helped train employees and finance the bank. One example was the aid the Steiner Brothers gave which helped the bank persist through the economic panic of 1893. He also believed in the relationship between financial and spiritual success, and in 1895 wrote a book entitled God's Revenue System about this idea.

In 1906, Pettiford organized the National Negro Banking Association at the convention of the National Negro Business League, where he was a prominent member. In 1910, Percy Bond organized another bank to service the African-American community in Birmingham, and the two clashed at the 1910 League convention in New York City. The bank continued its success and by 1913, the bank's assets were over $540,000 (equivalent to $12.6 million in 2024) and it had branches across the state. Pettiford's leadership was key to the bank's success, and the bank failed shortly after his death.

== Death ==
Pettiford took ill in March 1914 and took an indefinite leave from the head of the bank and was succeeded by J. O. Diffay. Pettiford died of heart failure on Sunday, September 20, 1914 in Birmingham, Alabama. His funeral was at the Sixteenth Street Baptist Church led by Rev. F. G. Ragland and Rev. D. P. Moore.
