= Atlantic Station, Atlanta =

Neighborhood in Atlanta, Georgia

Coordinates: 33.7925°N 84.3963°W

Atlantic Station

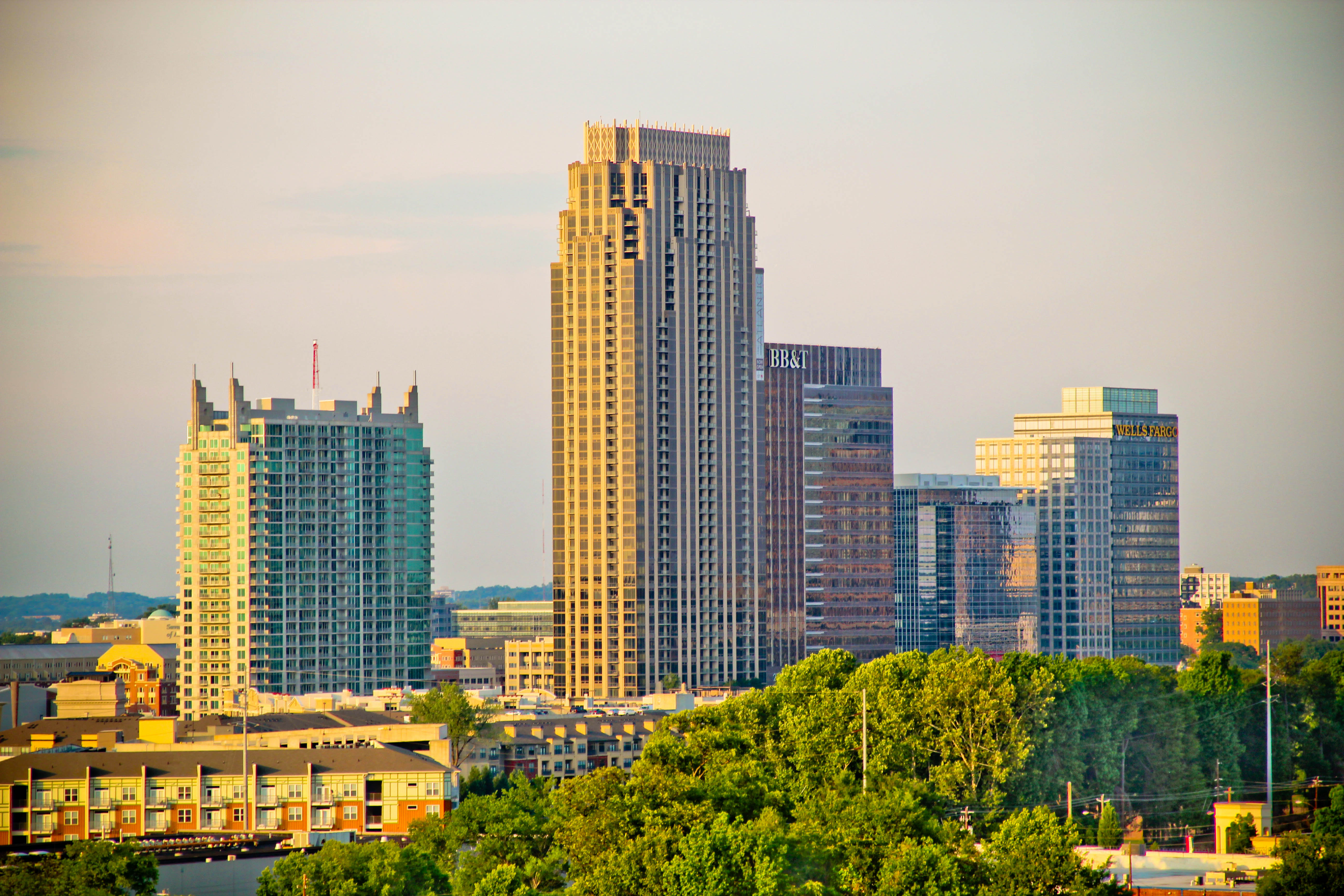
- The skyline of Atlantic Station in 2011
- Interactive map of Atlantic Station
- Location: Midtown Atlanta
- Address: 1380 Atlantic Dr NW, Atlanta, GA 30363
- Groundbreaking: 2002
- Opening: 2005
- Use: Mixed-use development
- Website: Official website

Companies
- Architect: Development Design Group
- Owner: Hines

Technical details
- Cost: $150 million
- Size: 523,511 sq. ft. (approx.)
- Proposed: 1998

Atlantic Station is a neighborhood on the northwestern edge of Midtown Atlanta, Georgia, United States comprising a retail district, office space, condominiums, townhomes and apartment buildings. First planned in the mid-1990s and officially opened in 2005, the neighborhood is located on the former brownfield site of the Atlantic Steel mill.

== History ==
Atlantic Station is located on the site of the Atlantic Steel mill, which opened in 1901. The steel mill was nearly closed in the mid-1970s, but it remained nominally operational primarily to avoid the huge costs it would have required to remediate the soil contamination present after years of operation.

Developer Jim Jacoby, who also redeveloped Florida's Marineland, began putting the project together in 1997 when his company became the property contractor of the land. The redevelopment of the land into what is now Atlantic Station was financed largely by private investment, but was heavily supplemented by a special tax district to pay for city tax bonds for public utilities (streets, sidewalks, and sewers). The development was originally planned to include 15 million square feet (1,400,000 m^{2}) of retail, office, residential space as well as 11 acres (45,000 m^{2}) of public parks. Its size encouraged the Postal Service to award the neighborhood its own ZIP code: 30363.

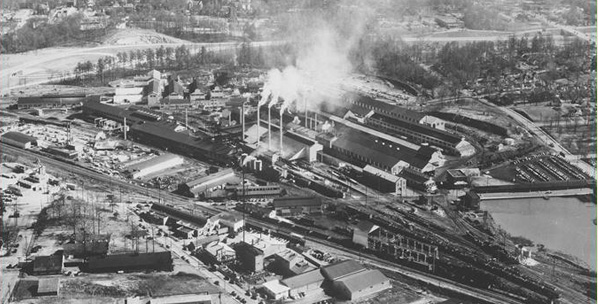
Atlantic Steel Mill

The project design was led by US architect, John Clark while working at Development Design Group Inc. (DDG), based in Baltimore.

Atlantic Station was designed with energy efficiency in mind and many of the buildings are LEED certified. Additionally, the project was developed to help mitigate urban sprawl and reduce air pollution by allowing many more people to live and work within walking distance of most everyday things they need, with many alternative transportation options nearby. The proposed BeltLine transit/greenway project is expected to pass within a few miles of the development.

In October 2003, the very first residents moved into the development. The 17th Street bridge was completed in January 2004 and the first round of retail establishments opened in October 2005. Atlantic Station received the EPA's 2004 Phoenix Award as the Best National Brownfield Redevelopment, as well as the Sierra Club's 2005 America's Best New Development Projects listing.

In July 2005, a pre-dawn fire completely destroyed a large wood-frame residential building under construction. Two days later, it was ruled arson after a major investigation. In addition to the destruction of the 65-unit Element building, which was only framed-in at the time, another 80 inhabited units at the Art Foundry across Mecaslin Street had damage to the facade, including scorching, broken windows, and melted miniblinds. At least five million dollars of damage was done to the buildings, 18 cars parked on the street were destroyed and another 7 were seriously damaged from the intense heat.

In a joint venture, North American Properties Atlanta, founded by Mark Toro, and CB Richard Ellis Investors closed on the purchase of Atlantic Station's retail component on December 31, 2010. Toro and the NAP management launched a social media blitz, attended community meetings and real estate symposiums to openly discuss challenges, such as crime, and invite feedback. Toro's vision to transform Atlantic Station included new retail, new restaurants, better parking and a renewed effort to make Atlantic Station a destination for in-town residents.

On October 1, 2015, Atlantic Station's retail core was officially sold to Hines Interest Limited Partnership with an unnamed joint financial partner.

On the night of November 26, 2022, several people opened fire in the Atlantic Station neighborhood. One person was shot and killed, while five others were injured.

== Layout ==
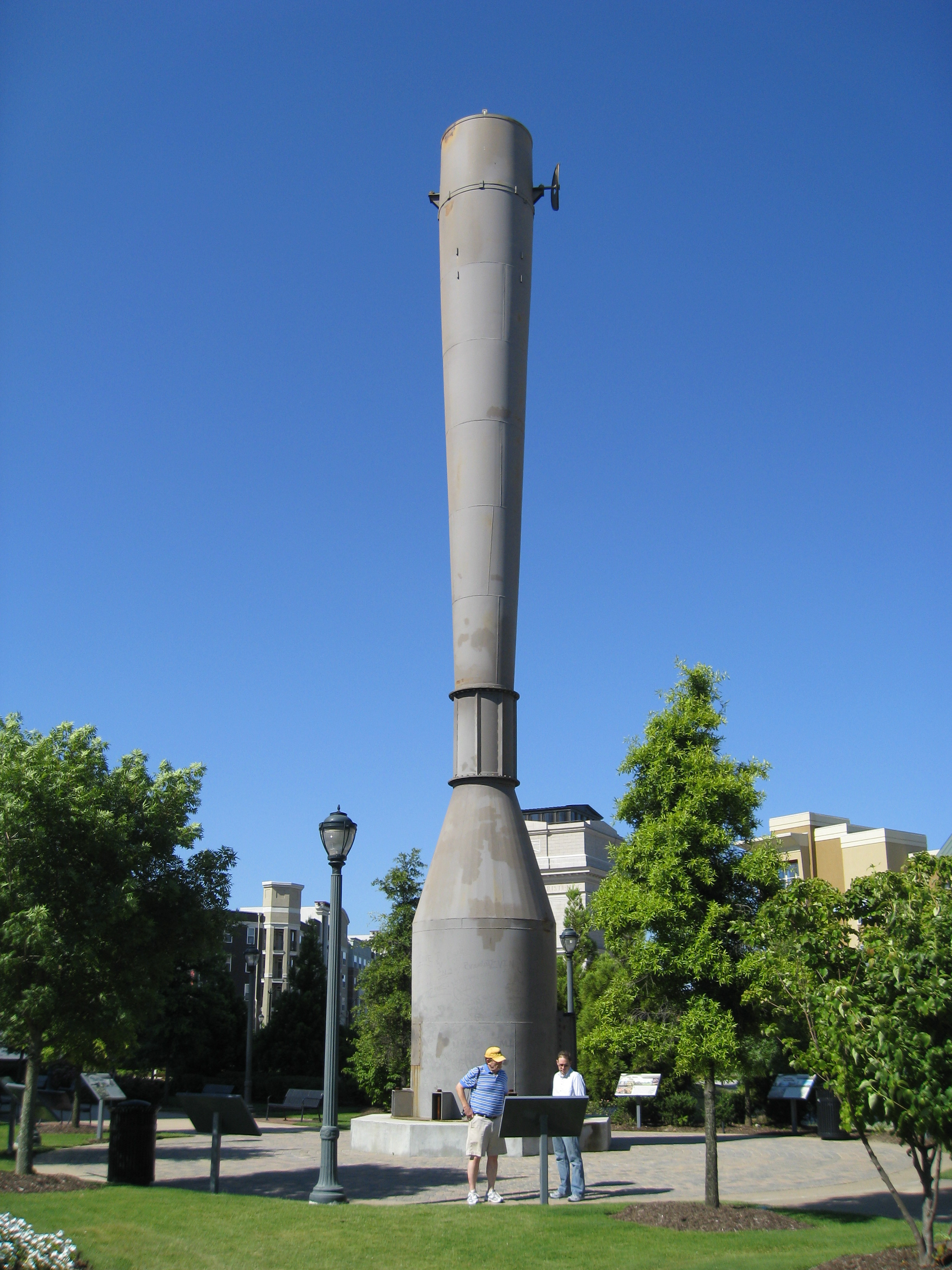
A smokestack from the original steel mill

Atlantic Station comprises three distinct areas that are lined along 17th Street between the Downtown Connector and Northside Drive, the District, the Commons, and the Village.

The District is where most of Atlantic Station's retail and office space is located. Opened on October 21, 2005, it was constructed in the style of an outdoor mall, with choices of shopping, dining, and a 16-screen Regal movie theater. Above the retail levels is an additional two to three stories of condominiums. With the 7,200-space parking garage underneath, the shopping area is pedestrian-friendly and many of the surface level streets are often closed off for special events. The southwest corner of The District is home to the 26-story, 336-foot (102 m) TWELVE Hotel and Residences Atlantic Station, which was completed in December 2005. In addition, townhomes constructed in 2004 line 16th Street one block south of The District.

The District's office space is located along the six-lane 17th Street Corridor, and is home to the 22-story tall 171 17th Street, known as the Wells Fargo Building and completed in 2004, and the 17-story 201 17th Street, completed in 2007. Developed by AIG Global Real Estate, 171 17th Street was awarded the silver certificate in the U.S. Green Building Council's Leadership in Energy and Environmental Design (LEED) Core and Shell Development program. 171 17th Street became the first-ever LEED Silver-Core and Shell certified high-rise office building, and the first high-rise office building in Georgia to receive any LEED certification. The 25-story BB&T Tower at 271 17th Street was completed in 2009, becoming Atlantic Station's tallest office tower. 271 was designed by tvsdesign and built by Brasfield & Gorrie.

The Commons is home to many low-rise condominiums, apartments, townhomes, and a large man-made stormwater retention pond that is located within the median of 17th Street. The Village is located on the westernmost portion of Atlantic Station, along 16th Street, and comprises an IKEA store that opened in 2005, as well as two apartment complexes.

== Retail ==
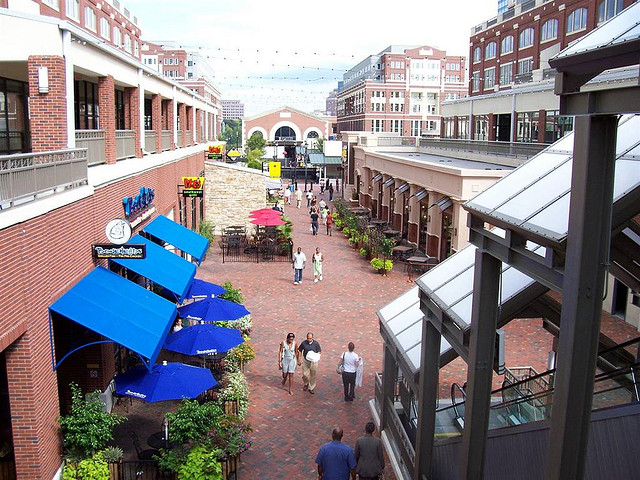
The courtyard of Atlantic Station's town center

Current tenants include Athleta, The Athlete's Foot, Atlanta Falcons Official Team Store, Atlanta United Official Team Store, AT&T, Banana Republic, Bath & Body Works, Cellairis, Dermalogica, Dillard's, DSW, Earth and Sky Creations, Express, The Eye Gallery, Fab'rik, Francesca's, Gap, H&M, Icing, IKEA, IT'SUGAR, Jos A. Bank, Journey's, Kate's, Kinnucan's, LA Fitness, Loft, Lush Nail Bar, Old Navy, Publix, Regal Cinemas, Target, Tervis, Victoria's Secret, West Elm, and Z Gallerie.

== Restaurants ==
Current restaurant tenants include Atlantic Grill, BGR The Burger Joint, California Pizza Kitchen, Bantam & Biddy, Great American Cookies, Kilwins Chocolates & Ice Cream, NaanStop, The Pig & the Pearl, Subway, Yard House, Salata, Gyu Kaku, Poke Bar, Envegan, and Allora.

== Attractions ==
The Premier Exhibition Center at Atlantic Station is currently home to the exhibit Bodies: The Exhibition.

Atlantic Station is home the Atlanta Open men's tennis tournament every summer. The event is an ATP 250-level tournament.

== Millennium Gate ==
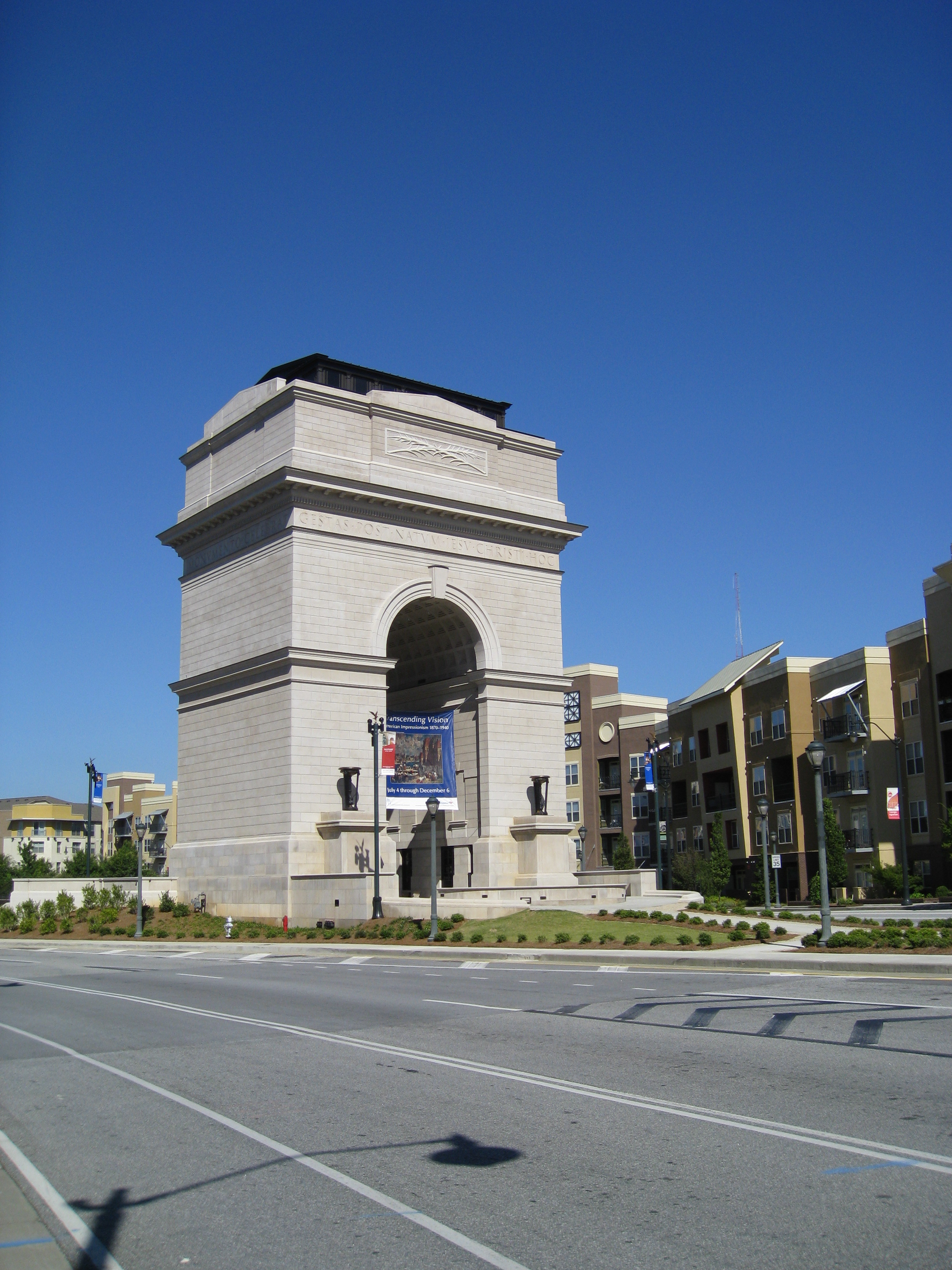
Millennium Gate

Adjacent to the Commons pond is the Millennium Gate, an $18 million arch intended to celebrate peaceful accomplishment, with special attention paid to Georgia's rich history and people. The Millennium Gate opened July 4, 2008. As of 2008, it is the largest classical monument to have been dedicated since completion of the Jefferson Memorial in Washington, D.C. Hugh Petter of ADAM Architecture was commissioned by the National Monuments Foundation to work alongside National Monuments director, Rodney Cook Jr., to develop the initial concepts into the final architectural design. The design is embellished with a sculptural allegory by Alexander Stoddart, telling the story of peaceful accomplishment over the last 2000 years.

It houses 12,000 sq ft (1,100 m^{2}) of gallery space, featuring traditional and modern exhibits. Collections of artifacts and family histories contribute to exhibits showcasing the pioneering and philanthropic spirit behind the development of Atlanta. Other exhibits include a recreation of the 1928 Rhodes-Robinson House foyer located on West Paces Ferry Road and a recreation of Thomas K. Glenn's office. Mr. Glenn, the late chairman of Trust Company bank, in the 1930s ran Atlantic Steel, previous owner of the land that is now Atlantic Station. Glenn's family is among the project's supporters.

The Millennium Gate has been greeted with puzzlement regarding its purpose, and it has been criticized by Modernists for its historic references. To this, New York sculptor George Kelly responds that "People are more drawn to tradition. It's the scale of it, it's the warmth of it. The word is beauty." Because of its proximity to the IKEA furniture store, some observers have given it the nickname "Arc d’Ikea."

The Gate's exhibits are open to the public. The rooftop penthouse, Foyer gallery, and Oval Lawn are available for weddings, conferences, and other events by booking only. The Millennium Gate also serves as a museum, but is only open to the public by appointment.

== Transportation ==
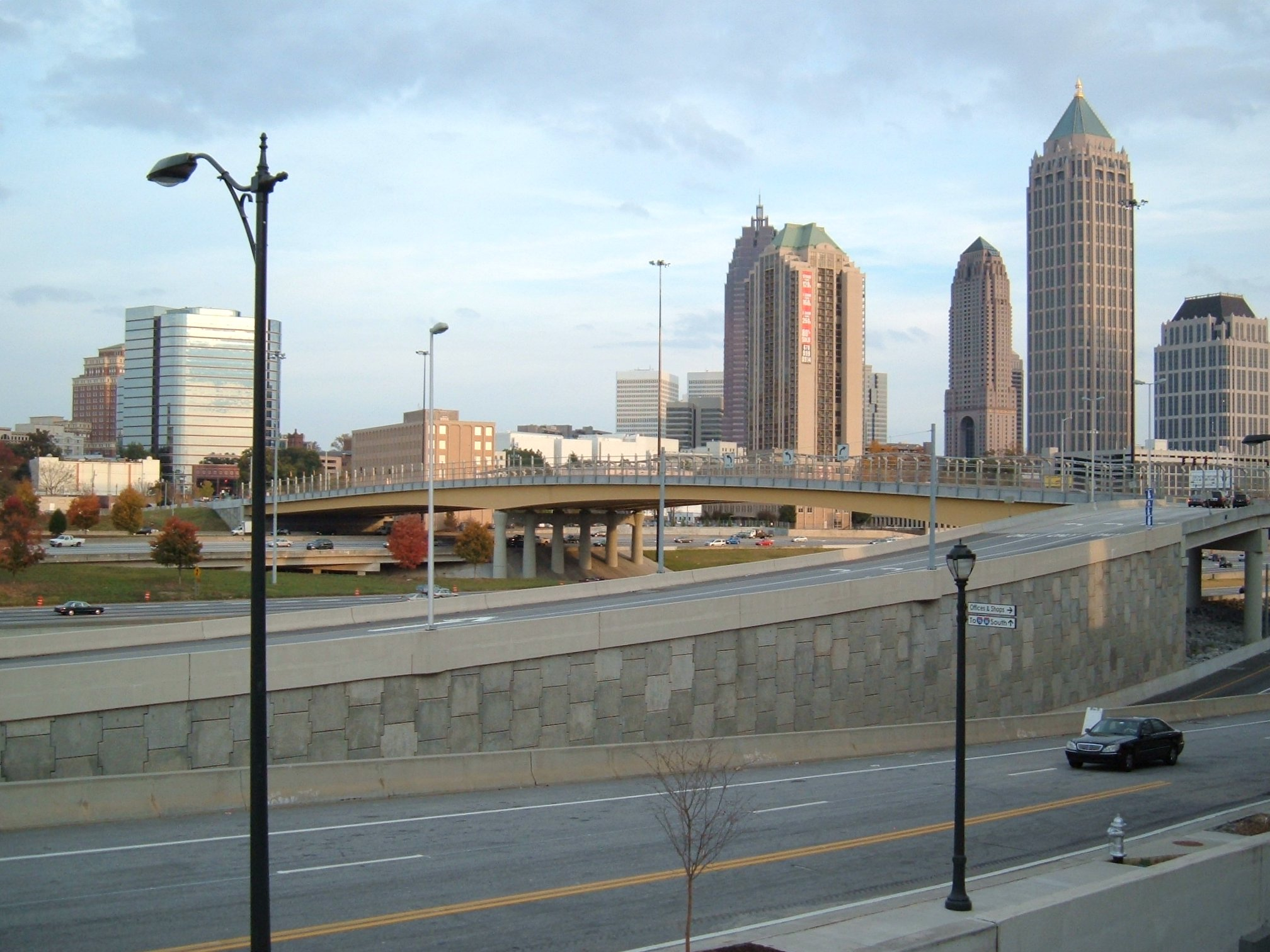
17th Street bridge over the Downtown Connector in 2005.

The primary roadway access to and through Atlantic Station is an extension of 17th Street constructed by the developers. As part of the project, the Georgia Department of Transportation erected the yellow 17th Street bridge over the I-75/85 Downtown Connector expressway that separates Atlantic Station and the Home Park neighborhood from the rest of Midtown. Controversy developed at the time of construction not only because of the bridge's unusual yellow color, but also for GDOT's insistence that the bridge and street meet highway standards. The section of the street west of the bridge consists of four through-lanes of traffic, in addition to a bus lane, bike lane, and turning lanes in each direction.

Access to public transportation is provided via a free shuttle that runs every 5–15 minutes to the Arts Center MARTA rail station as well as MARTA and Cobb Linc bus routes. A railroad line runs along the northern border, but passenger service on the Amtrak Crescent is available only at the Peachtree Station in Brookwood, one mile away. In April 2011, the city of Atlanta submitted a grant application seeking $22.5 million to relocate that station to the Atlantic Station community. Shuttle service is also provided by Lanier Parking Solutions, for Georgia Tech students in the student apartments, the Flats.

Despite the pedestrian-friendly arrangement of much of the eastern section of the project, parking is inexpensive (first two hours of deck parking is free) and easily available in underground parking decks; indeed most visitors arrive by car.
