= Andrew Young =

American politician, diplomat, activist and pastor (born 1932)

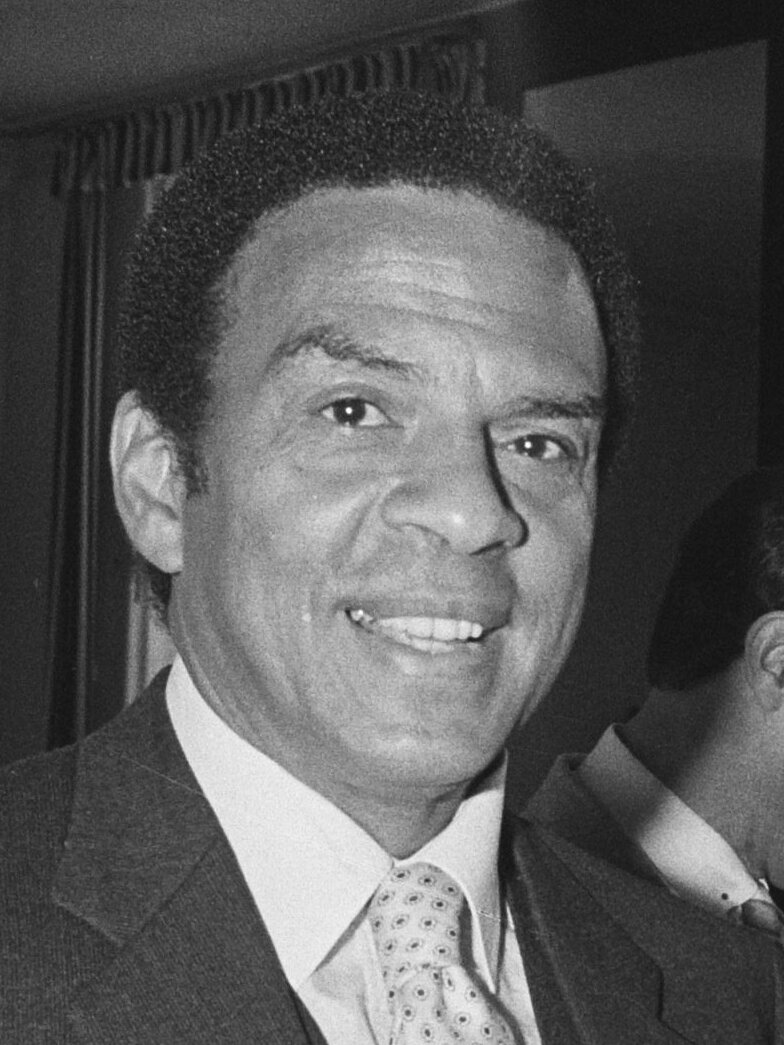
- Young in 1984

55th Mayor of Atlanta
- In office January 4, 1982 – January 2, 1990
- Preceded by: Maynard Jackson
- Succeeded by: Maynard Jackson

14th United States Ambassador to the United Nations
- In office January 30, 1977 – September 23, 1979
- President: Jimmy Carter
- Preceded by: William Scranton
- Succeeded by: Donald McHenry

Member of the U.S. House of Representatives from Georgia's 5th district
- In office January 3, 1973 – January 29, 1977
- Preceded by: Fletcher Thompson
- Succeeded by: Wyche Fowler

Personal details
- Born: Andrew Jackson Young Jr. March 12, 1932 (age 94) New Orleans, Louisiana, U.S.
- Party: Democratic
- Spouses: Jean Childs (m. 1954; died 1994); Carolyn McClain (m. 1996)
- Children: 4
- Education: Dillard University (attended); Howard University (BS); Hartford Seminary (BDiv)

Andrew Jackson Young Jr. (born March 12, 1932) is an American politician, diplomat, and activist. Beginning his career as a pastor, Young was an early leader in the civil rights movement, serving as executive director of the Southern Christian Leadership Conference (SCLC) and as a close confidant to Martin Luther King Jr. A member of the Democratic Party, Young later became active in politics, serving as a U.S. Congressman from Georgia, United States Ambassador to the United Nations in the Carter Administration, and 55th Mayor of Atlanta. He was the first Black American elected to Congress from Georgia since Reconstruction, as well as one of the first two Black Americans elected to Congress from the former Confederacy since Reconstruction. Since leaving office, Young has founded or served in many organizations working on issues of public policy and political lobbying.

== Early life ==
Andrew Young was born on March 12, 1932, in New Orleans, to Daisy Young, a schoolteacher, and Andrew Jackson Young, a dentist. Young's father hired a professional boxer to teach Andrew and his brother to defend themselves. In a 1964 interview with author Robert Penn Warren for his book, Who Speaks for the Negro?, Young recalls the tensions of segregation in New Orleans, especially growing up in a fairly well-to-do household. He recalls that his parents tried to "compensate for segregation" by providing for their children but were reluctant to help less wealthy black communities in the area.

Young attended Dillard University for one year before graduating from Howard University. He then earned a divinity degree from Hartford Seminary in Hartford, Connecticut, in 1955. He is a member of Alpha Phi Alpha fraternity.

== Early career ==
Young was appointed to serve as pastor of a church in Marion, Alabama. It was there in Marion that he met Jean Childs, who later became his wife. Young became interested in Mahatma Gandhi's concept of nonviolent resistance as a tactic for social change. He encouraged African Americans to register to vote in Alabama, and sometimes faced death threats while doing so. It was at this time that he became a friend and ally of Martin Luther King Jr.

In 1955, Young accepted a pastorate at Bethany Congregational Church in Thomasville, Georgia.

In 1957, Young and Jean moved to New York City when he accepted a job with the Youth Division of the National Council of Churches. While in New York City, Young regularly appeared on Look Up and Live, a weekly Sunday morning television program on CBS, produced by the National Council of Churches in an effort to reach out to secular youth.

Young served as a pastor of the Evergreen Congregational Church in Beachton, Georgia, from 1957 to 1959.

In 1960, he joined the Southern Christian Leadership Conference. No longer satisfied with his work in New York City, Young moved to Atlanta, Georgia, in 1961 upon the invitation of Bernard Lafayette and worked to register black voters. Young played a key role in the 1963 events in Birmingham, Alabama, serving as a mediator between the white and black communities as they negotiated against a background of protests.

In 1964, Young was named executive director of the Southern Christian Leadership Conference. As a colleague and friend of Martin Luther King Jr., he was a strategist and negotiator during the Civil Rights Campaigns in Birmingham (1963), St. Augustine (1964), Selma (1965), and Atlanta (1966). He was jailed for his participation in civil rights demonstrations, both in Selma, Alabama, and in St. Augustine, Florida. The movement gained congressional passage of the Civil Rights Act of 1964 and Voting Rights Act of 1965.

Young was with King in Memphis, Tennessee, when King was assassinated on April 4, 1968. Following the deaths of Jesse Jackson and civil rights activist Clara Ester, who both died in 2026, Andrew Young is believed to be the last surviving eyewitness to King's assassination.

== Congress ==
In 1970, Andrew Young ran as a Democrat for the 5th District seat in the US House of Representatives, from Georgia, but was unsuccessful. After his defeat, Rev. Fred C. Bennette Jr. introduced him to Murray M. Silver, an Atlanta attorney, who served as his campaign finance chairman. Young ran again in 1972 and won. He later was re-elected in 1974 and in 1976. During his four-plus years in Congress, he was a member of the Congressional Black Caucus, and was involved in several debates regarding foreign relations, including the decision to stop supporting the Portuguese attempts to hold on to their colonies in southern Africa. Young also sat on the powerful Rules Committee and the Banking and Urban Development Committee. Young opposed the Vietnam War, helped enact legislation that established the U.S. Institute for Peace, established the Chattahoochee River National Recreation Area and negotiated federal funds for MARTA and the Atlanta Highways.

== American Ambassador to the United Nations ==
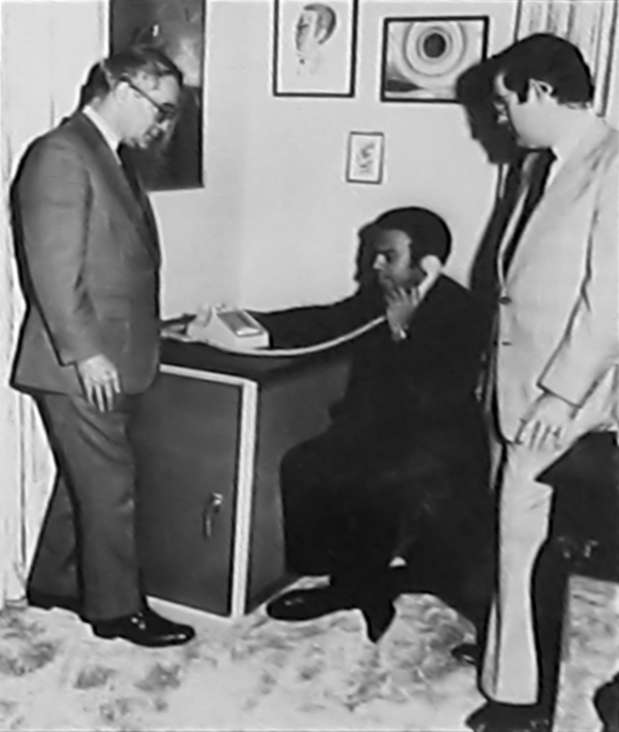
Ambassador Young, calling from New York City on an STU-I secure phone during the Egypt–Israel peace talks. (NSA museum)

In 1977, President Jimmy Carter appointed Young to serve as the United States Ambassador to the United Nations. Young was the first Black American to hold the position. Atlanta city councilman Wyche Fowler won the special election to fill Young's seat in Congress.

Although the US and the UN enacted an arms embargo against South Africa, as President Carter's UN ambassador, Young vetoed economic sanctions.

Young caused controversy when, during a July 1978 interview with French newspaper Le Matin de Paris while discussing the Soviet Union and its treatment of political dissidents, he said, "We still have hundreds of people that I would categorize as political prisoners in our prisons", in reference to jailed civil-rights and anti-war protestors. In response, US Representative Larry McDonald (D-GA) sponsored a resolution to impeach Young, but the measure failed 82 to 293. Carter referred to it in a press conference as an "unfortunate statement."

In 1979, Young played a leading role in advancing a settlement in Rhodesia with Robert Mugabe and Joshua Nkomo, who had been two of the rebel leaders in the Rhodesian Bush War, which had ended in 1979. The settlement paved the way for Mugabe to take power as Prime Minister of the newly formed Republic of Zimbabwe. There had been a general election in 1979, bringing Bishop Abel Muzorewa to power as leader of the United African National Council leading to the short-lived country of Zimbabwe Rhodesia. Though majority rule had been implemented, many in the international community felt that the reforms were not wide-ranging enough. Young refused to accept the election results and described the election as "neofascist," a sentiment echoed by United Nations Security Council Resolution 445 and 448. The situation was resolved the next year with the Lancaster House Agreement and the establishment of Zimbabwe.

Young's favoring of Mugabe and Nkomo over Muzorewa and his predecessor and ally, Ian Smith, has been controversial. Many African-American activists, including Jesse Jackson and Coretta Scott King, supported the anticolonialism represented by Mugabe and Nkomo. However, it was opposed by others, including civil-rights leader Bayard Rustin, who argued that the 1979 election had been "free and fair", as well as Senators Harry F. Byrd Jr. (I-VA) and Jesse Helms (R-NC). It was later criticized in 2005 by Gabriel Shumba, executive director of the anti-Mugabe Zimbabwe Exiles Forum.

In July 1979, Young discovered that an upcoming report by the United Nations Division for Palestinian Rights called for the creation of a Palestinian State. Young wanted to delay the report because the Carter Administration was dealing with too many other issues at the time. He met with the UN representatives of several Arab countries to try to convince them the report should be delayed; they agreed in principle but insisted that the Palestine Liberation Organization also had to agree. As a result, on July 20, Young met with Zuhdi Labib Terzi, the UN representative of the PLO, at the apartment of the UN Ambassador from Kuwait. On August 10, news of the meeting became public when the Mossad leaked its illegally-acquired transcript of the meeting first to Prime Minister Menachem Begin, and then through his office to Newsweek. The meeting was highly controversial since the United States had already promised Israel that it would not meet directly with the PLO until it recognized Israel's right to exist.

During the controversy, Young took a break and was invited by John F. Kennedy Jr. to speak about apartheid in South Africa at Brown University.

Young's UN ambassadorship ended on August 14. Carter denied any complicity in what was called the "Andy Young Affair" and asked Young to resign. Asked about the incident by Time soon afterward, Young stated, "It is very difficult to do the things that I think are in the interest of the country and maintain the standards of protocol and diplomacy.... I really don't feel a bit sorry for anything that I have done." Soon afterward, on the television show Meet the Press, he stated that Israel was "stubborn and intransigent."

After his ambassadorship ended, Young became a guest lecturer at Michigan State University in East Lansing, Michigan.

== Atlanta mayor ==
In 1981, after being urged by a number of people, including Coretta Scott King, the widow of Martin Luther King Jr., Young ran for mayor of Atlanta. He was elected later that year with 55% of the vote, succeeding Maynard Jackson. As mayor of Atlanta, he brought in $70 billion of new private investment. He continued and expanded Jackson's programs for including minority and female-owned businesses in all city contracts. The Mayor's Task Force on Education established the Dream Jamboree College Fair that tripled the college scholarships given to Atlanta public school graduates. In 1985, he was involved in renovating the Atlanta Zoo, which was renamed Zoo Atlanta. Young was re-elected as mayor in 1985 with more than 80% of the vote. Atlanta hosted the 1988 Democratic National Convention during Young's tenure. He was prohibited by term limits from running for a third term. During his tenure, he talked about how he was "glad to be mayor of this city, where once the mayor had me thrown in jail."

A 1993 survey of historians, political scientists and urban experts conducted by Melvin G. Holli of the University of Illinois at Chicago saw Young ranked as the fifteenth-best American big-city mayor to serve between the years 1820 and 1993. The survey also saw Young ranked the fifth-best big-city mayor to serve in office post-1960.

== 1990 Georgia gubernatorial election ==
After leaving the mayor's office in early 1990, Young launched a bid for the Democratic nomination for governor in 1990. He ran in a primary that included three former or future governors of Georgia: then lieutenant governor Zell Miller, then-state senator Roy Barnes, and former governor Lester Maddox. The field also contained then state representative Lauren "Bubba" McDonald. The first poll put Young at 38 percent to Miller's 30 percent, 15 percent for Maddox and 10 percent for Barnes with McDonald trailing at 7 percent. Young campaigned hard but by the primary, with no central message, his campaign ran into trouble against the well-heeled and prepared lieutenant governor. Miller led the primary with 40 percent to Young's 29 percent and 21 percent for Barnes, Maddox got 7 percent and McDonald rounded out at 3 percent. Future U.S. senator Johnny Isakson won the Republican nomination. After Miller's stunning and broad-based primary win, Young's campaign floundered. Many think he failed in his effort by trying to garner support amongst rural, conservative white voters, rather than turning out his urban and African-American base. Also, Young never found an issue that roused supporters, unlike Miller, who won voters by championing a state lottery. Miller won the runoff, 2 to 1 and ended Young's gubernatorial aspirations for good.

== Post-mayoral career ==
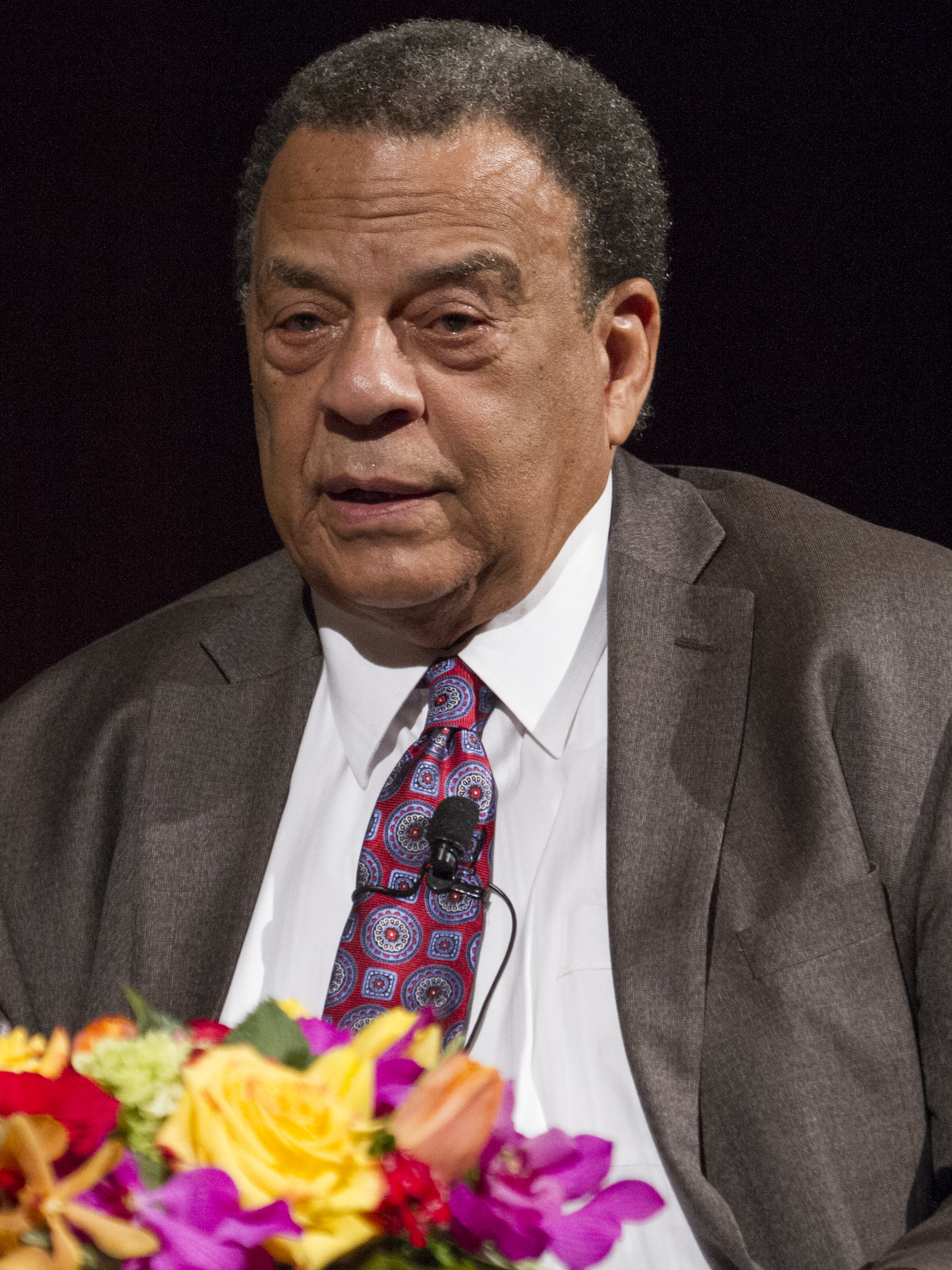
Young gives a speech in 2013.

Young has been a director of the Drum Major Institute for Public Policy, and is also the chairman of the board for the Global Initiative for the Advancement of Nutritional Therapy.

In 1990, Young was a member of the Atlanta Olympic bid committee. He served as co-chair of the 1996 Summer Olympic Games.

Between April 29 to May 3, 1992, the 1992 Los Angeles riots took place in response to the acquittal of the four LAPD officers charged with using excessive force in the arrest of Rodney King. After President George H. W. Bush said initially that justice had been served, Young criticized him as having known better: "I never got mad during the whole civil rights movement because I knew what I was dealing with with an Alabama jury or a Mississippi jury. But from a California jury in the home of a former president, I expected more – particularly when they’ve got pictures."

From 2000 to 2001, Young served as president of the National Council of Churches.

In April 2000, Young appeared on stage with Vice President Al Gore at Morehouse College as the presidential candidate called for programs to better the access of computers and the Internet for minorities. After the election, in which Gore lost to George W. Bush, Young spoke at Ebenezer Baptist Church, calling for Bush to not follow the divisiveness of his party and cited Attorney General nominee John Ashcroft as not being qualified "to be attorney general at a time like this."

In 2003, Young founded the Andrew Young Foundation, an organization meant to support and promote education, health, leadership and human rights in the United States, Africa and the Caribbean.

From February to August 2006, Young served as the public spokesman for Working Families for Walmart, an advocacy group for the retail chain Walmart. Young resigned from the position soon after a controversial interview with the Los Angeles Sentinel, in which, when asked about Walmart hurting independent businesses, he replied, "You see those are the people who have been overcharging us, and they sold out and moved to Florida. I think they've ripped off our communities enough. First it was Jews, then it was Koreans and now it's Arabs."

In 2007, GoodWorks Productions released the documentary film Rwanda Rising, about Rwanda's progress since the Rwandan genocide of 1994. Young also served as the film's narrator. Rwanda Rising premiered as the opening night selection at the Pan African Film Festival in Los Angeles in 2007.

An edited version of Rwanda Rising served as the pilot episode of Andrew Young Presents, a series of quarterly, hour-long specials airing on nationally syndicated television.

On January 22, 2008, Young appeared as a guest on the television show The Colbert Report. Host Stephen Colbert invited Young to appear during the writers' strike, because, in 1969, Young and Colbert's father had worked together to mediate a hospital workers' strike. Young made another appearance on The Colbert Report on November 5, 2008, to talk about the election of Barack Obama to the presidency.

Young co-wrote and co-produced the 2010 documentary film Change in the Wind, about the friendship between Gone with the Wind (1936) author Margaret Mitchell and civil rights leader Benjamin Mays, who was the president of the traditionally black Morehouse College; Mitchell became a major benefactor of the institution. The documentary also revealed the friendship between Mitchell and actress Hattie McDaniel, who played Mammy in the 1939 film Gone with the Wind.

In 2014, the Tourism office of the Bahamas commissioned Jamaal Rolle to paint a portrait of Andrew Young to give him as a gift during a conference where he was the special guest.

On January 19, 2015, Young gave the keynote address at Vanderbilt University's Martin Luther King Jr. Commemoration Day. The theme was "Dismantling Segregation: Race, Poverty, and Privilege", and Young spoke about his experiences in Selma, stories of traveling with King, and his advice to the next generation of leaders.

Young served on the board of the Trumpet Awards Foundation and was a cofounder of Bounce TV, which acquired the Trumpet Awards in 2016.

On May 13, 2019, Young gave the keynote address at Emory University's spring commencement ceremony.

On May 29, 2020, Young remarked on the protests in Atlanta in reaction to the murder of George Floyd. He stated that riots, violence, and looting "hurt the cause instead of helping it".

Young is co-chairman of Rodney Cook Sr. Park along with National Monuments Foundation president Rodney Mims Cook Jr. This peace park is located in the Vine City neighborhood on Atlanta's westside and has a strong civil rights focus.

In 2023, Young launched the "Andrew Young HBCU Scholarship Program" funded by McGraw Hill Education in partnership with the Institute of World Politics Chair of Law and Human Rights, Matthew Daniels and the Thurgood Marshall College Fund. The scholarship is awarded to students who "demonstrate the vision and leadership potential to be an ambassador for the unifying, non-violent principles of Dr. King and Ambassador Young, rooted in respect for the fundamental dignity, rights, and equality of all human beings." Young also endorsed a companion bible study for those seeking to apply Dr. King's teachings to improving their communities.

Following a reading from the Book of Ephesians, Young delivered the homily at the state funeral service for Jimmy Carter at Washington National Cathedral on January 9, 2025.

On March 1, 2026, Young traveled to South Carolina to speak with University of South Carolina Upstate's Bennie Harris for the monthly Below the Line feature. On March 2, 2026, Young spoke at a private memorial service for Rev. Jesse Jackson at the South Carolina State House in Columbia, South Carolina. On March 22, 2026, Young spoke at the funeral service of civil rights activist Bernard Lafayette, held at Tuskegee University Chapel in Tuskegee, Alabama.

Young criticized the Roberts Court's decision in Louisiana v. Callais (2026) for striking down part of Section 2 of the Voting Rights Act.

== Personal life and family ==
Young has four children with his first wife, Jean Childs Young, who died of liver cancer in 1994. His mother-in-law was Idella Jones Childs. He married Carolyn McClain in 1996. His daughter Lisa died on March 14, 2025, from cancer.

In September 1999, Young was diagnosed with prostate cancer which was successfully removed with surgery in January 2000.

== Books ==
- An Easy Burden: The Civil Rights Movement and the Transformation of America. (January 1998);
- A Way Out of No Way. (June 1994);
- Andrew Young at the United Nations. (January 1978);
- The History of the Civil Rights Movement. (9 volumes) (September 1990);
- Trespassing Ghost: A Critical Study of Andrew Young. (January 1978);
- Walk in My Shoes: Conversations between a Civil Rights Legend and his Godson on the Journey Ahead with Kabir Sehgal. (May 2010) ISBN 978-0-230-62360-6;

== Writings ==
- Young, Andrew, Harvey Newman, and Andrea Young. 2016. Andrew Young and the Making of Modern Atlanta. Macon, GA: Mercer University Press.

== Awards and honors ==
- Presidential Medal of Freedom;
- France's Légion d'honneur;
- The NAACP Spingarn Medal;
- Four Freedoms Award for the Freedom of Worship;
- More than 45 honorary degrees including awards from Dartmouth, Yale, Notre Dame, Clark Atlanta, Emory, Oglethorpe University, Lakeland University and the University of Georgia;
- 1978 Adam Clayton Powell Award (Phoenix Award)
- Legend in Leadership Award, Yale University
- 1983 Golden Plate Award of the American Academy of Achievement
- 1995 Eagle Award from the United States Sports Academy. The Eagle Award is the Academy's highest honor and was awarded to Young for his significant contribution to international sport.
- 1996 Harold Washington Award (Phoenix Award)
- 2002 Order of the Long Leaf Pine
- Honorary Co-Chair of the World Justice Project;
- 2005 "Louisiana Legend" by Louisiana Public Broadcasting in Baton Rouge, along with timber industrialist Roy O. Martin Jr., comedian Kix Brooks, and the Louisiana State University athletic legends Paul Dietzel and Sue Gunter
- The 2011 Lifetime Achievement Emmy Award, for his involvement on Look Up and Live;
- 2012 Georgia Trustee. Given by the Georgia Historical Society, in conjunction with the Governor of Georgia, to individuals whose accomplishments and community service reflect the ideals of the founding body of Trustees, which governed the Georgia colony from 1732 to 1752.
- 2018 Ivan Allen Jr. Prize for Social Courage.
- 2023 induction into the Black Music & Entertainment Walk of Fame.

=== Places named after Andrew Young ===
- In 1999 Georgia State University in Atlanta renamed its public policy school the Andrew Young School of Policy Studies to honor Young.
- International Boulevard, near Centennial Olympic Park, was renamed Andrew Young International Boulevard, in honor of his involvement in bringing the 1996 Summer Olympics to Atlanta.
- The Andrew Young Center for Global Leadership at Morehouse College was named after Young.
- The Andrew and Walter Young YMCA, the only full-service YMCA operating in Southwest Atlanta, is named after Young and his younger brother.
- A Delta Air Lines Boeing 767-300ER bears Young's name in recognition of his civil rights achievements.
- On March 11, 2021, Delta Air Lines renamed the building at the entrance to their headquarters as the "Ambassador Andrew J. Young International Building"
- The Andrew Young Crossing in St. Augustine, FL

== In popular culture ==
Young is played by Howard E. Rollins Jr. in the 1978 television miniseries King.

Young is played by Andre Holland in the 2014 film Selma.

== See also ==
- List of African-American United States representatives
- List of civil rights leaders
- Timeline of Atlanta, 1980s

U.S. House of Representatives
Preceded by Fletcher Thompson	Member of the U.S. House of Representatives from Georgia's 5th congressional district 1973–1977	Succeeded by Wyche Fowler
Diplomatic posts
Preceded by William Scranton	United States Ambassador to the United Nations; 1977–1979	Succeeded by Donald McHenry
Political offices
Preceded by Maynard Jackson	Mayor of Atlanta; 1982–1990	Succeeded by Maynard Jackson
U.S. order of precedence (ceremonial)
Preceded by Tom Malinowski as Former U.S. Representative	Order of precedence of the United States as Former U.S. Representative	Succeeded by Marjorie Taylor Greene as Former U.S. Representative
