= Lincoln Normal School =

- Phillips Memorial Auditorium
- U.S. National Register of Historic Places
- Alabama Register of Landmarks and Heritage
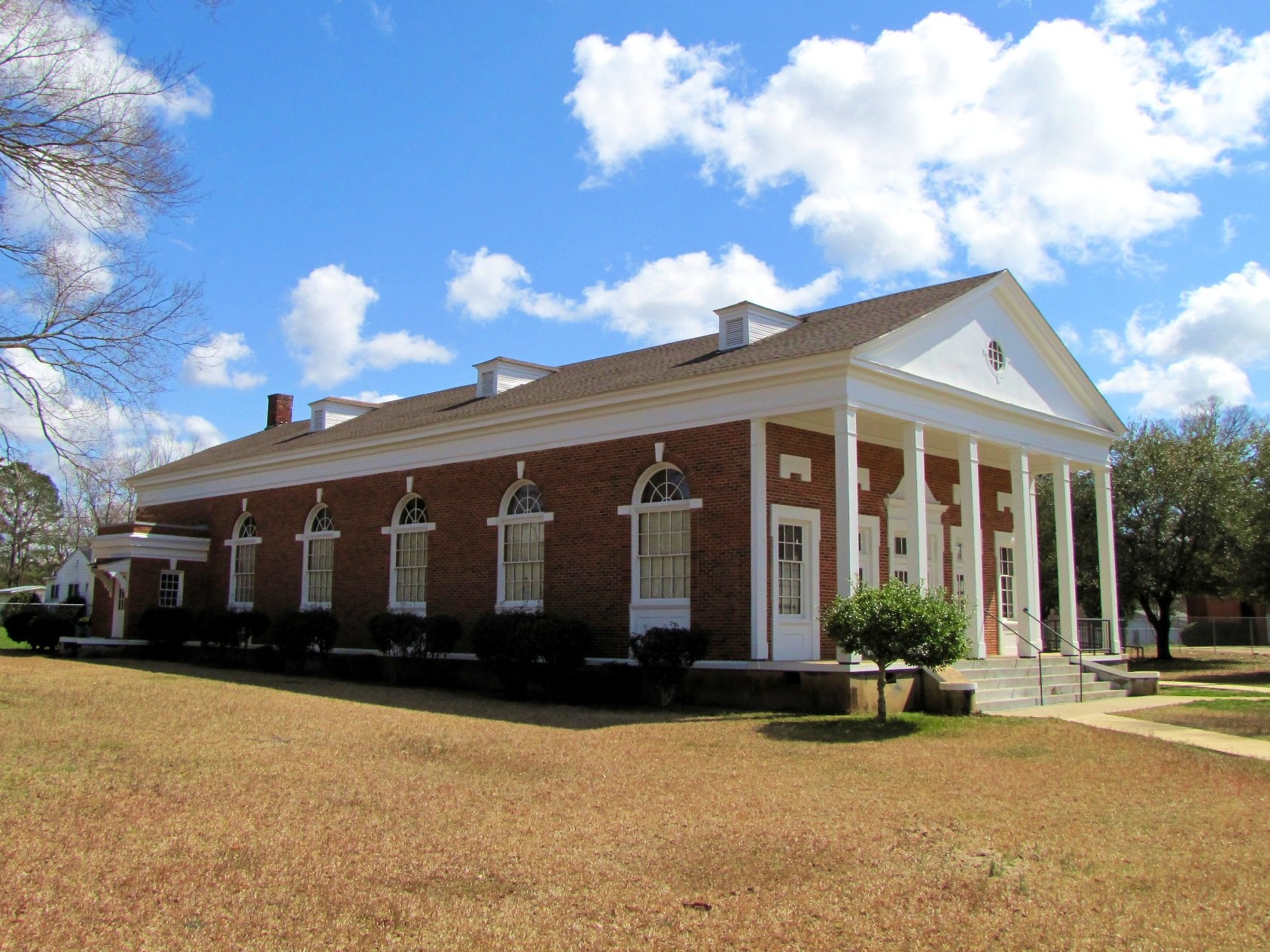
- Phillips Memorial Auditorium, one of only a few campus buildings still standing

- Location within Alabama Location within the United States
- Location: Lincoln Ave. and Lee St., Marion, Alabama
- Coordinates: 32°37′32″N 87°19′45″W
- Area: 0.1 acres (0.040 ha)
- Built: 1937
- Architectural style: Classical Revival
- NRHP reference No.: 88003243

Significant dates
- Added to NRHP: February 13, 1990
- Designated ARLH: February 19, 1988

The Lincoln Normal School (1867–1970), originally Lincoln School and later reorganized as State Normal School and University for the Education of Colored Teachers and Students, was a historic African American school expanded to include a normal school in Marion, Alabama. Founded less than two years after the end of the Civil War, it is one of the oldest HBCUs (historically black colleges and universities) in the United States.

== History ==
The school's roots go back to a Union Army soldier who remained in Marion after the end of the Civil War to teach newly freed African Americans. His efforts proved successful and in 1867 the school was incorporated with the support of African Americans from the surrounding Perry County.

Nine ex-slaves, Joey Pinch, Thomas Speed, Nickolas Dale, James Childs, Thomas Lee, John Freeman, Nathan Levert, David Harris, and Alexander H. Curtis, made up the first Board of Trustees. Under their guidance, the black and white community of Marion raised five hundred dollars to buy land for the school's campus. The money to build the school building came from the American Missionary Association (AMA). In 1868, school trustees sought the assistance of the AMA for help with day-to-day operation of the school. The AMA supplied teachers and financial support.

In 1871, Alabama State Board of Education member Peyton Finley pushed for the school's expansion into a normal school and university.

== Teacher training ==
In 1870, the school expanded to include teacher training and for a time became known as the Lincoln Normal University for Teachers. The program primarily focused on training African American high school graduates to become teachers. In 1885, Lincoln School was voted the top school for freed slaves in the south. On July 26, 1878, William Burns Paterson left Tullibody Academy to accept the Presidency of the State Normal School and University for Colored Students and Teachers in Marion, Alabama. In 1887 fire destroyed many of the campus buildings. As a result, the teacher training function was relocated to Montgomery where it became Alabama State University.

== Faculty ==
The school was led by several principals, most notably Miss Mary Elizabeth Phillips. During her tenure from 1896 to 1927 both the campus and student body expanded. In 1939, alumni and friends constructed Phillips Memorial Auditorium in her honor.

Other notable faculty included Cecil and Fran Thomas who were instrumental in establishing a choral program at the school. Under their direction, choirs from the school toured across the Southeast and Midwest.

== Legacy and reputation ==
Lincoln School became well known for graduating a high proportion of students who went on to attain advanced degrees, a remarkable achievement for any school but more particularly for a segregated high school in rural Alabama.

The school closed in 1970, when it was consolidated with the newly built and racially integrated Marion High School. One of the few buildings remaining on the campus site is the Phillips Memorial Auditorium, now on the National Register of Historic Places and the Alabama Register of Landmarks and Heritage. The Lincoln High School Gymnasium was also added to the Alabama Register on February 29, 2005.

== Notable alumni ==
- Coretta Scott King, civil rights activist and wife of Martin Luther King Jr.
- Edythe Scott Bagley, educator, and civil rights activist
- William R. Pettiford, Birmingham minister and banker
- Jean Childs Young, wife of civil rights activist Andrew Young
- Odith Thelma Patton, mother of Bishop T. D. Jakes
