= Jamaal Rolle =

Bahamian artist and journalist (born 1984)

Jamaal Rolle (born 7 June 1984), also known as "The Celebrity Artist", is a Bahamian visual artist and journalist.

He is known for his life-like portrait depictions of world figures, government officials, entertainment celebrities, and sports stars. Rolle has received wide attention and critical acclaim for his depictions of U.S. President Barack Obama, Prince Harry, Sir Sidney Poitier, Oprah Winfrey, Johnny Depp, and Michael Jackson.

Rolle is a multi-disciplinary artist, working in mediums including acrylic, oils, charcoal, graphite, colored pencil, pastels, digital media, and cosmetics and has embarked on creating artwork using food.

== Early life and education ==
Jamaal Rolle was born in Nassau, Bahamas, on Thursday, 7 June 1984. He is the sixth child of thirteen siblings who are all artistic. His father, Harry Rolle, is a landscape artist, caricaturist, and bronze sculptor, and his mother, Judy Rolle, is a conch-shell artist.

Rolle was first inspired to become an artist after a teacher who found a caricature drawing Rolle had made of him in class and purchased it for $10.00.

== Career ==
Rolle's career started in 2001, at Christmas Treasures where Rolle created Junkanoo-inspired Christmas ornaments under the supervision of the late Paul Knowles. Rolle later transitioned to drawing live portraits and caricatures at the Marina Village, Atlantis Paradise Island in the Bahamas.

Rolle is the artist and writer behind the socio-political news column, "Pushin Da Envelope", featured on weekdays in The Tribune newspaper in the Bahamas.

=== 2008 U.S. presidential election ===
Rolle was inspired by then-presidential nominee Barack Obama and started the "Bahama for Obama" campaign, which used the phrase "I Am the Dream" (an allusion to Martin Luther King Jr.'s 1963 "I Have a Dream" speech) during the 2008 U.S. presidential election. Obama also "inspired him to do an oil portrait on Super Tuesday. He displays this portrait at his studio in downtown Nassau and it has received heavy attention from the thousands of American tourists that pass by on a daily basis." During President Barack Obama's 2009 inauguration, Rolle presented a portrait to Reverend Al Sharpton at the Martin Luther King Jr. Day Rally in Washington, D.C. The portrait depicts side-by'side portraits of Obama, Sharpton, and King.
