= Millennium Gate Museum =

Coordinates: 33.79107°N 84.39975°W

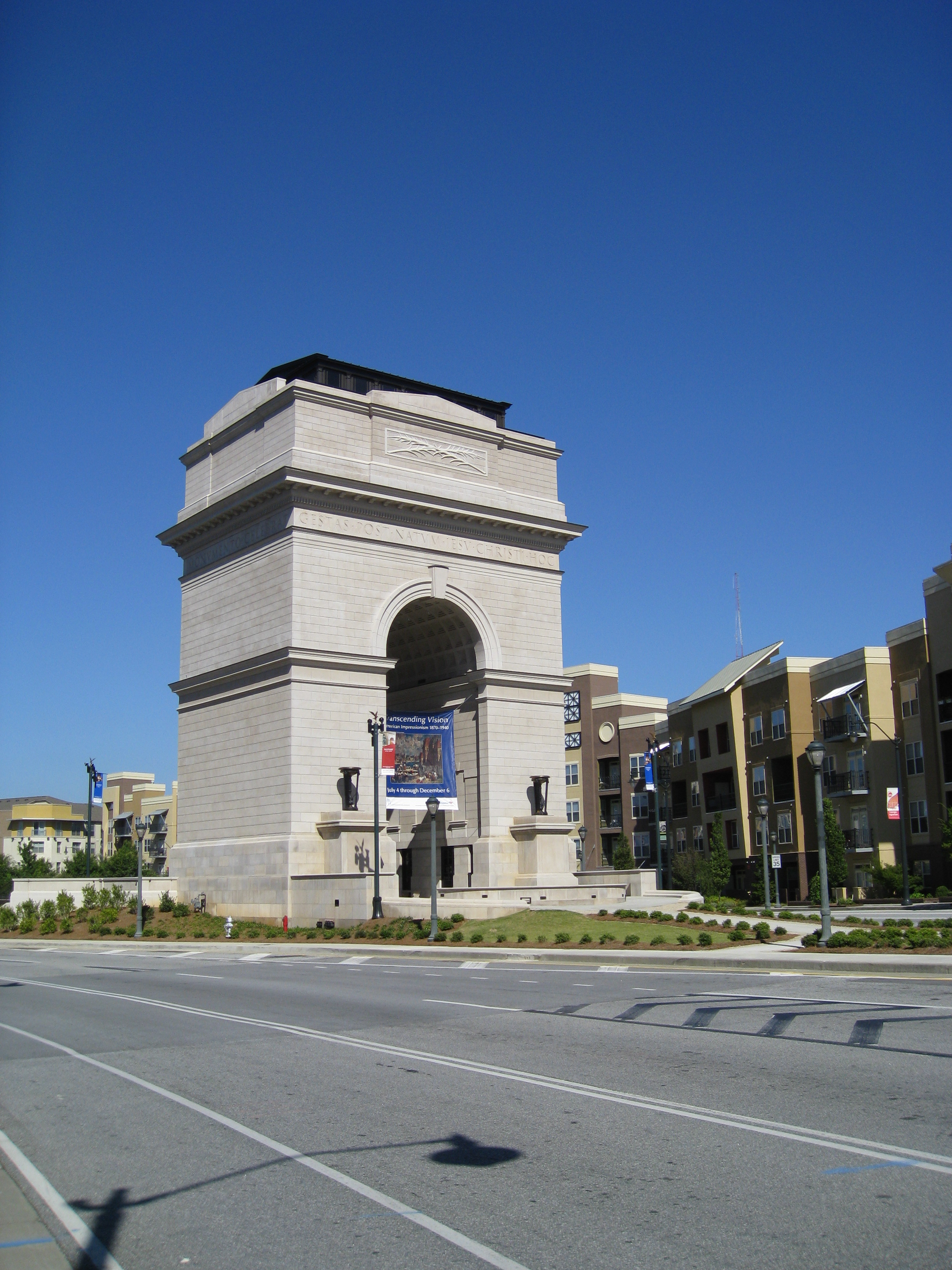
- The Millennium Gate Museum

General information
- Type: Triumphal arch Art museum
- Architectural style: New Classical
- Location: Atlanta, United States
- Construction started: 2005
- Completed: 2008

Design and construction
- Architects: Hugh Petter; Rodney Cook Jr. ADAM Architecture

The Millennium Gate Museum (also known as The Gate) is a triumphal arch and Georgia history museum located in Atlanta, on 17th Street in the Atlantic Station district of Midtown.

It was the largest classical monument created in the United States since the Jefferson Memorial in 1943. At 82 feet (25 m) tall, it also surpassed the 77-foot tall (23 m) Big Chicken and became the largest roadside attraction in Georgia.

The monument celebrates peaceful accomplishment and its supporters see celebrating classicism as celebrating democracy. The design was a collaboration of Rodney Mims Cook Jr and Hugh Petter of ADAM Architecture to refine the 10 winning entries from a design in competition in 2000. It is a project of the National Monuments Foundation.

== History ==
The Millennium Gate Museum opened July 4, 2008, and cost approximately $20 million. CollinsCooperCarusi, Atlanta were the architects of record. Lady Henrietta Spencer-Churchill was the curator of the period rooms. Tunnell and Tunnell were the landscape architects. The arch had originally been intended for a location in Washington, DC, but failed to gain sufficient official support.

The design is embellished with sculptural allegory by Scottish sculptor Alexander Stoddart, telling the story of peaceful accomplishment of the last 2000 years. Stoddart's Peace and Justice Gates flanking the arch were given the 2006 Palladio Award for best American design of a public space.

The arch inscription reads, in Latin: "This American monument was built to commemorate all peaceful accomplishment since the birth of Jesus Christ in the year of our Lord, MM."

The initial response to the museum was mixed, with some critics claiming that the design was inappropriate to the site or the city, but the building was gaining acceptance after its first year installed.

=== Design competition winners ===
The names of the 10 winners of the 2000 Millennium Gate Design Competition are carved into the base of the monument:

- Lisa Schmitt Bergman (USA)
- Marianne Cusato (USA)
- Anton Glikin (Russia)
- Shelley Hoenle (USA)
- Abdul Muzikir (Saudi Arabia)
- Silvia Neri (Italy)
- Daniel Parolek (USA)
- Milan Petkovic (Czech Republic)
- Joseph Matthew Smith (USA)
- Luis Pedro Vasquez-Lobos (Guatemala)

== Museum and collections ==
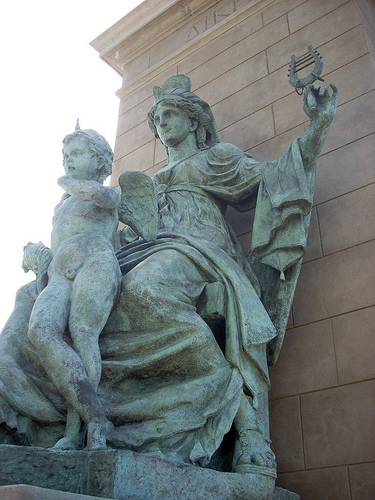
Alexander Stoddart's "Justice"

The Museum houses 12,000 sq ft (1,100 m^{2}) of gallery space. They are arranged in a series of Savannah double parlors by century, the enfilade created as a result ends at an exedra cloister with a monumental bronze bust of President George Washington.

Beginning with pre-Columbian Native American history and 16th century Spanish settlement of the coast, the 18th Century Georgia Pioneer Gallery focuses on General James Oglethorpe's creation of the Colony of Georgia. The gallery contains documents and historical artifacts from the American Indian, Spanish, British Colonial, and American Revolutionary periods.

The 19th and 20th Century galleries narrate the story of Atlanta's and Georgia's early history. The exhibition features photographs and artifacts from twenty of Atlanta's pioneering families.

In partnership with Georgia Tech's Interactive Media Technology Center, the museum has created the 21st Century Interactive Gallery, allows visitors to explore Atlanta and how philanthropy has changed the city over time.

The Millennium Gate features three period rooms: an 18th-century Colonial study from Georgia's Declaration of Independence signer Lyman Hall's Midway, Georgia, the 19th century office of Coca-Cola magnate Thomas K. Glenn during his tenure as president of Atlantic Steel and the Trust Company of Georgia simultaneously, and the 20th century drawing room of Pink House, the Rhodes-Robinson home designed by Philip T. Shutze and Edward Vason Jones.

== Gallery ==
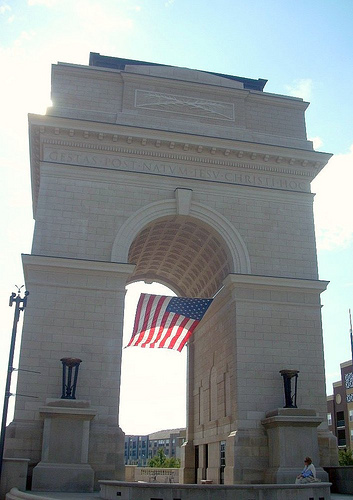

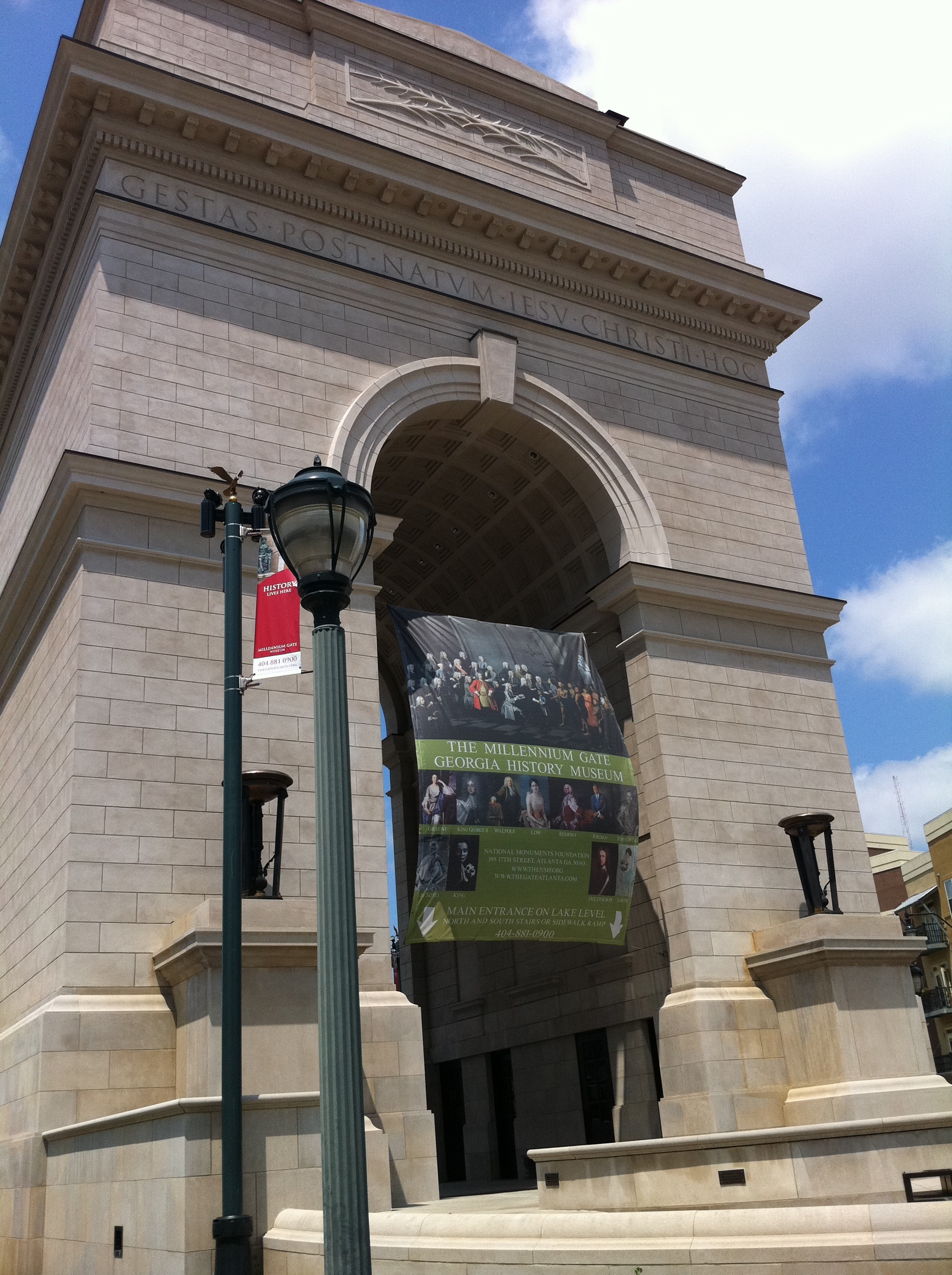
