= National Monuments Foundation =

Organization

Coordinates: 33.79107°N 84.39975°W

- Type: Non-Profit Foundation
- Legal status: 501(c)(3)
- Purpose: Arts, Culture, and Humanities
- Leader: Rodney Mims Cook Jr.

The National Monuments Foundation is a non-profit organization that builds monuments, including the World Athletes Monument and the Millennium Gate in Atlanta.

== History and activities ==
It is run by Rodney Mims Cook Jr. who has also been appointed twice by President Trump to the US Commission of Fine Arts which reviews and approves monuments in Washington, D.C.

The foundation, like its founder, is focused on traditionalism (meaning the common architecture of Europe and its royal family) has also attracted supporters among the tech right who have an affinity with neo conservative Venture Capitalist like Joe Lonsdale. The foundation created an exhibit about the life of Andrew Young that had been displayed at three colleges in mid-2024. This Foundation has little significant experience in architecture or design except to duplicate historical forms like arches etc. As a firm, it is committed to its founders affinity for classical design, having once said "modernism has destroyed American cities".[5]Boyles, Sallie (July 2, 2019). "A Storied Past and Brighter Future". Vie Magazine. Archived from the original on February 9, 2026. Retrieved March 15, 2026.

== See also ==
- Rodney Cook Sr. Park
