= List of parks in Atlanta =

Parks in Atlanta
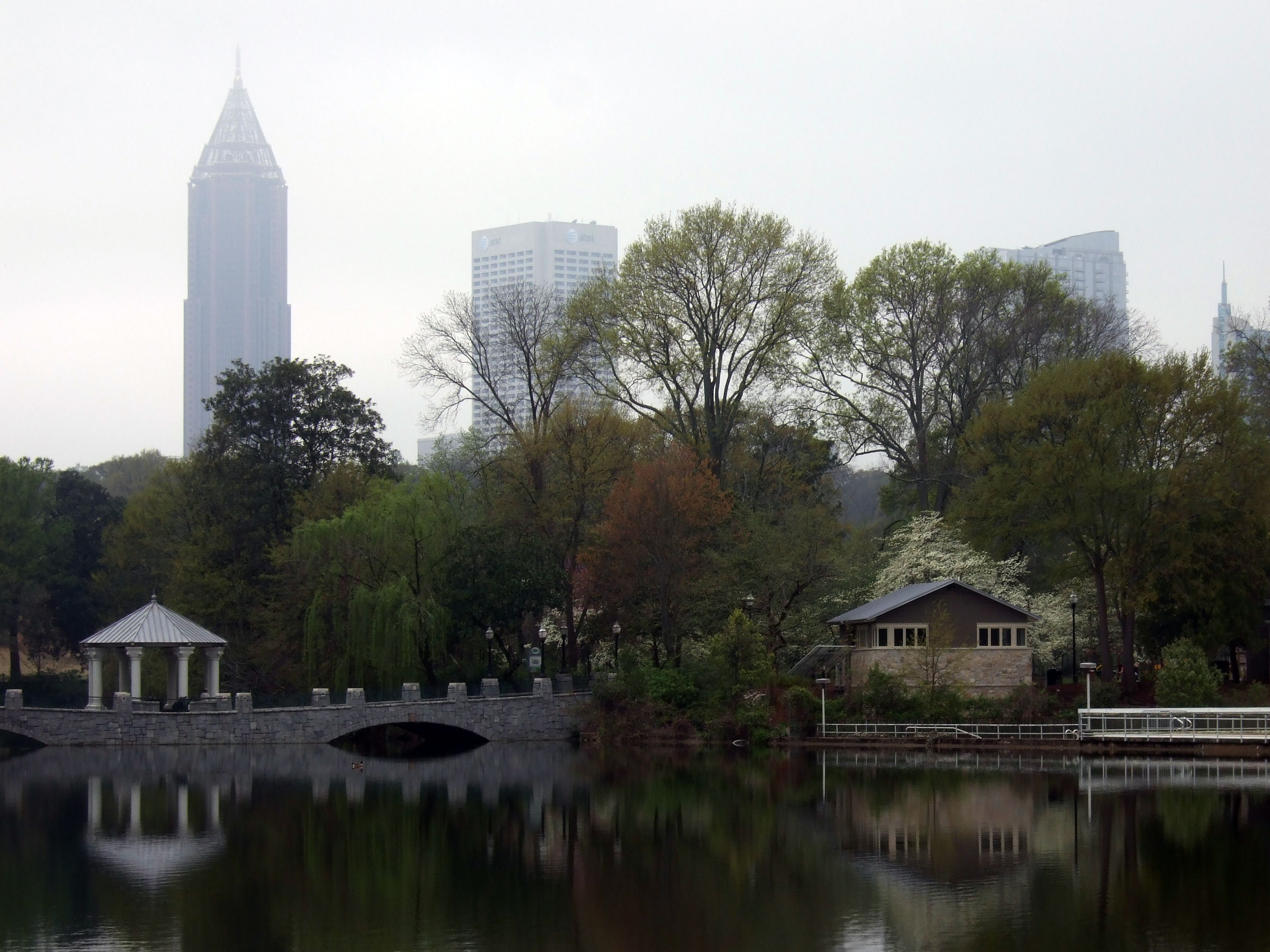
- Location: Atlanta, Georgia, United States
- Area: 3,000 acres (12 km^{2})
- Created: 1882
- Operator: City of Atlanta Department of Parks and Recreation
- Website: https://www.atlantaga.gov/government/departments/department-parks-recreation/office-of-parks

The City of Atlanta maintains a comprehensive system of municipal parks spanning over 3,000 acres of protected green space throughout the city. Administered by the City of Atlanta Department of Parks and Recreation, the park system encompasses diverse landscapes including urban regional parks, neighborhood greenspaces, nature preserves, and recreational facilities. This network serves residents and visitors across all neighborhoods represented by the city's Neighborhood Planning Units (NPU) system, ensuring equitable access to outdoor recreation and environmental stewardship throughout Atlanta's twenty-city council districts.

The city's park development and stewardship strategy is anchored in the "Activate ATL" master plan, a foundational policy framework designed to enhance park accessibility, community engagement, and environmental sustainability. The plan classifies properties into distinct categories—Regional Parks, Community Parks, Neighborhood Parks, Nature Preserves, Trail Corridors, and Playlots & Greenspots—each serving specific recreational, ecological, and social functions. This systematic classification enables strategic resource allocation, program planning, and capital improvements that align with neighborhood-specific needs and city-wide recreation priorities. The park system includes twenty-four recreation centers featuring programming for youth, adults, and seniors, while maintaining natural areas critical to the city's urban forest canopy and watershed management.

== Regional Parks ==
Park Name	Location / Address	Acreage	Notes / Facilities
Adams Park	2300 Wilson Dr. SW (NPU-R)	158.44 acres (64.12 ha)	Features a municipal recreation center; Regional park with extensive recreational facilities
Chastain Park	Powers Ferry Rd. NW and Chastain Park Ave. NW (NPU-A)	268 acres (108.46 ha)	Features a municipal recreation center; Second-largest city park; Includes Synovus Bank Amphitheater
Grant Park	840 Cherokee Ave. SE (NPU-W)	131.5 acres (53.22 ha)	Features a municipal recreation center; Home to Zoo Atlanta
Perkerson Park	770 Deckner Ave. SW (NPU-X)	49.9 acres (20.19 ha)	Features a municipal recreation center; Regional park with recreation facilities
Southside Park	3460 Jonesboro Rd. SE (NPU-Z)	211.44 acres (85.57 ha)	Regional park serving southeast Atlanta; Large recreational area
Freedom Park	Moreland Ave / North Ave NE (NPU-N)	188.59 acres (76.32 ha)	Linear park; Connects historic neighborhoods via Beltline trails
Piedmont Park	400 Park Dr. NE (NPU-E)	185 acres (74.87 ha)	Historic urban park with cultural events; designed by Olmsted Brothers
Historic Fourth Ward Park	664 Angier Avenue (NPU-M)	18.2 acres (7.37 ha)	Regional park; Part of Atlanta Beltline development; Urban greenspace in historic neighborhood
Historic Fourth Ward Skate Park	850 Willoughby Way (NPU-M)	4.5 acres (1.82 ha)	Regional park; Dedicated skateboard facility
Robert W. Woodruff Park	91 Peachtree St. NE (NPU-M)	3.3 acres (1.34 ha)	Regional park; Downtown civic space; Anchors Georgia State University campus
Springdale Park	1247 Ponce de Leon Ave. NE (NPU-N)	5.25 acres (2.12 ha)	Regional park; Midtown neighborhood park
Virgilee Park	1324 Ponce de Leon Ave. NE (NPU-N)	3.5 acres (1.42 ha)	Regional park; Neighborhood greenspace
Oak Grove Park	1451 Ponce de Leon Ave. NE (NPU-N)	3.43 acres (1.39 ha)	Regional park; Historic neighborhood park
Dellwood Park	Ponce de Leon Ave. NE (NPU-N)	1.36 acres (0.55 ha)	Regional park; Small neighborhood greenspace
Browns Mill Golf Course	480 Cleveland Ave. SE (NPU-Z)	160.13 acres (64.80 ha)	Regional park; Municipal golf facility with 18 holes
Atlanta Memorial Park	384 Woodward Way NW (NPU-C)	199 acres (80.53 ha)	Community classification; Large memorial park space
Shirley Clarke Franklin Park	1660 Johnson Road NW (NPU-G)	280 acres (113.31 ha)	Atlanta's largest park; Former quarry site; Features 35-acre emergency water reservoir and Atlanta Beltline trails
John A. White Park	1053 Cascade Cir. SW (NPU-S)	106.65 acres (43.16 ha)	Regional park; Large southwest Atlanta recreation area
Oakland Cemetery	248 Oakland Ave. SE (NPU-W)	48 acres (19.42 ha)	Historic regional park; National Register of Historic Places; Civil War cemetery; burial site of Margaret Mitchell and Bobby Jones
Rodney Cook Sr. Park	616 Joseph E Boone Blvd. (NPU-L)	16 acres (6.47 ha)	Regional park in Historic Vine City (acreage data incomplete)

== Community Parks ==
Park Name	Location / Address	Acreage	Notes / Facilities
A.D. Williams Park	1154 James Jackson Parkway NW (NPU-G)	11 acres (4.45 ha)	Features a municipal recreation center
Arthur Langford Jr Park	211 Thornton St. SW (NPU-Y)	9.9 acres (4.01 ha)	Features a municipal recreation center
Bessie Branham Park	2051 Delano Dr. / Norwood Ave. NE (NPU-O)	6.58 acres (2.66 ha)	Features a municipal recreation center
Brownwood Park	607 Brownwood Ave. SE (NPU-W)	12.33 acres (4.99 ha)	Features a municipal recreation center
C.T. Martin Recreation Center	3201 Martin Luther King Jr. Dr. SW (NPU-I)	11 acres (4.45 ha)	Features a municipal recreation center
Candler Park	1500 McLendon Ave. NE (NPU-N)	55.3 acres (22.38 ha)	Community park; Named after Coca-Cola magnate Asa Candler; Features golf course and swimming pool
Central Park	400 Merritts Ave. NE (NPU-M)	17.37 acres (7.03 ha)	Features a municipal recreation center; Community park in downtown area
Coan Park	1530 Woodbine Ave. SE (NPU-O)	13.26 acres (5.37 ha)	Features a municipal recreation center
Collier Park	3691 Collier Drive SW (NPU-H)	16.17 acres (6.54 ha)	Features a municipal recreation center
Charles Rambo Sr. Park	98 Anderson Ave. NW (NPU-J)	56.7 acres (22.95 ha)	Features a municipal recreation center
Center Hill Park	2305 Bankhead Hwy. NW (NPU-J)	46 acres (18.62 ha)	Community park; Neighborhood recreation area
Dr. Mary Shy Scott Park	3114 Collier Dr. NW (NPU-I)	23.4 acres (9.47 ha)	Community park; West Atlanta recreation area
East Lake Park	2617 Memorial Dr. SE / 241 Daniel St. (NPU-O)	10.3 acres (4.17 ha)	Features a municipal recreation center
English Park	1350 Bolton Rd. NW (NPU-G)	9.5 acres (3.84 ha)	Features a municipal recreation center
Four Corners Park	1040 Crew St. SE (NPU-V)	1.5 acres (0.61 ha)	Features a municipal recreation center
Gertrude Place	Gertrude Place / Bankhead Hwy. NW (NPU-J)	1.27 acres (0.51 ha)	Community park; Small recreation area
Grove Park	709 Hortense Place NW (NPU-J)	17.35 acres (7.02 ha)	Features a municipal recreation center
Historic Bagley Park	100 Bagley St. / Pharr Rd. NE (NPU-B)	21.3 acres (8.62 ha)	Community park; Historic north Atlanta park
J.D. Sims Recreation Center	544 Angier Ave. NE (NPU-M)	0.85 acres (0.34 ha)	Features a municipal recreation center
Lang-Carson Park	100 Flat Shoals Ave. SE (NPU-N)	3.24 acres (1.31 ha)	Features a municipal recreation center
Maddox Park	1115 Bankhead Hwy. NW / Marietta Blvd. (NPU-K)	51.5 acres (20.84 ha)	Community park; Large northwest Atlanta park
Mozley Park	1565 Martin Luther King Jr. Dr. SW (NPU-K)	28.15 acres (11.39 ha)	Features a municipal recreation center
Peachtree Hills Park	308 Peachtree Hills Ave. NE (NPU-B)	7.2 acres (2.91 ha)	Features a municipal recreation center
Pittman Park	950 Garibaldi St. SE (NPU-V)	14.1 acres (5.71 ha)	Features a municipal recreation center
Red's Farm and Nature Preserve	703 Naomi St. SE (NPU-W)	5.34 acres (2.16 ha)	Community park; Environmental education area
Rev. James Orange Park	1305 Oakland Dr. SW at Epworth (NPU-S)	15.4 acres (6.23 ha)	Community park; South Atlanta recreation area
Rosel Fann Park (Southeast Atlanta)	365 Cleveland Ave. SE (NPU-Z)	20.08 acres (8.13 ha)	Features a municipal recreation center
Rosa L. Burney Park (Dunbar)	477 Windsor St. SE (NPU-V)	13.73 acres (5.56 ha)	Features a municipal recreation center
Selena S. Butler Park	98 William Holmes Borders Dr. NE (NPU-M)	3.36 acres (1.36 ha)	Features a municipal recreation center
South Bend Park	1955 Compton Dr. SE (NPU-Y)	76.6 acres (31.00 ha)	Community park; Large south Atlanta park
Thomasville Park	1835 Henry Thomas Drive SE (NPU-Z)	44.09 acres (17.84 ha)	Features a municipal recreation center
Washington Park	102 Ollie St. NW / Lena St. NW (NPU-K)	20.43 acres (8.27 ha)	Features a municipal recreation center
West Manor Park	3240 W. Manor Cir. SW / Benjamin E. Mays Dr. SW (NPU-I)	11.2 acres (4.53 ha)	Features a municipal recreation center
Ben Hill Park	2405 Fairburn Rd SW (NPU-P)	21.97 acres (8.89 ha)	Community park; West Atlanta recreation area
Browns Mill Food Forest	2217 Browns Mill Rd SE (NPU-Z)	7.1 acres (2.87 ha)	Community park; Urban agriculture facility
Boulevard Crossing Park	Boulevard & Englewood Avenue (NPU-W)	21.3 acres (8.62 ha)	Community/Park in Holding designation
Summerhill Triangle	Fulton St. SE / Sydney St. / Glenwood Ave. (NPU-V)	0.27 acres (0.11 ha)	Community park; Neighborhood greenspot

== Neighborhood Parks ==
Park Name	Location / Address	Acreage	Notes / Facilities
Adair Park I	742 Catherine St. SW (NPU-V)	6.39 acres (2.59 ha)	Neighborhood park; South Atlanta recreation
Adair Park II	866 Murphy Ave. SW (NPU-V)	10.6 acres (4.29 ha)	Neighborhood park; South Atlanta recreation
Adamsville Gym Park	3404 Delmar Lane SW (NPU-H)	0.82 acres (0.33 ha)	Features a municipal recreation center
Ansley Park	Maddox Dr. / E. Park Lane NE (NPU-E)	6.11 acres (2.47 ha)	Neighborhood park; Midtown Atlanta
Barbara A. McCoy Park	1640 Kenmore St. SW (NPU-S)	8.5 acres (3.44 ha)	Neighborhood park; Southwest Atlanta
Beaverbrook Park	Brookview Dr. NW / Beaverbrook Dr. (NPU-C)	6.8 acres (2.75 ha)	Neighborhood park; North Atlanta
Beecher Park	Edgewater Dr. / Beecher Rd. SW (NPU-I)	5.8 acres (2.35 ha)	Neighborhood park; Southwest Atlanta
Benteen Park	Benteen Ave. / Casanova St. SE (NPU-W)	9.81 acres (3.97 ha)	Neighborhood park; Southeast Atlanta
Betty Young Park	473 Woodward Way NW (NPU-C)	0.74 acres (0.30 ha)	Features a municipal recreation center
Cabbagetown Park	701 Kirkwood Ave. SE (NPU-N)	3.1 acres (1.25 ha)	Neighborhood park; Historic east Atlanta
Chattahoochee Park	Bolton Rd. / Peyton Rd. NW (NPU-D)	3.2 acres (1.29 ha)	Neighborhood park; North Atlanta
Chosewood Park	1385 Gault Street SE (NPU-W)	0.19 acres (0.08 ha)	Neighborhood park; East Atlanta
Cleopas R. Johnson Park	Northside Dr. / Fair St. SW (NPU-T)	4.3 acres (1.74 ha)	Neighborhood park; Southwest Atlanta
Cleveland Avenue Park	41 Cleveland Ave. SE (NPU-Z)	5.86 acres (2.37 ha)	Neighborhood park; Southeast Atlanta
D.H. Stanton Park	213 Haygood Ave. SE (NPU-V)	7.9 acres (3.20 ha)	Neighborhood park; Southeast Atlanta
Deerwood Park	Alexandria Dr. / Tampa Trail SW (NPU-P)	17.4 acres (7.04 ha)	Neighborhood park; Southwest Atlanta
Emma Millican Park	Deckner Ave. / Clinton Pl. SW (NPU-X)	9.73 acres (3.94 ha)	Neighborhood park; South Atlanta
Empire Park	245 Oak Dr. SE (NPU-Z)	11.8 acres (4.78 ha)	Neighborhood park; Southeast Atlanta
Esther Peachy Lefevre	Wylie St. / Powell St. SE (NPU-N)	0.7 acres (0.28 ha)	Neighborhood park; East Atlanta
Eubanks Park (The Prado)	The Prado and Barksdale Dr. NE (NPU-E)	1.37 acres (0.55 ha)	Neighborhood park; Midtown Atlanta
Garden Hills Park	E. Wesley / Rumson Rd. (NPU-B)	3.6 acres (1.46 ha)	Neighborhood park; North Atlanta
Gilliam Park	Clifton St. / Wade Ave. / Wyman St. NE (NPU-O)	2.6 acres (1.05 ha)	Neighborhood park; East Atlanta
Goldsboro Park	1368 Euclid Ave. NE / Goldsboro Rd. (NPU-N)	2.5 acres (1.01 ha)	Neighborhood park; East Atlanta
Harper Park	Wilson Rd / Southside Industrial Parkway (NPU-Z)	13.57 acres (5.49 ha)	Neighborhood park; Southeast Atlanta
Isabel Gates Webster Park	275 Peyton Rd. SW / Peyton Place (NPU-I)	15.69 acres (6.35 ha)	Neighborhood park; Southwest Atlanta
Iverson Park	1429 Iverson St. NE (NPU-N)	2 acres (0.81 ha)	Neighborhood park; East Atlanta
John F. Kennedy Park	225 Chestnut St. / Orr St. NW (NPU-L)	4.8 acres (1.94 ha)	Neighborhood park; Northwest Atlanta
John Howell Memorial Park	797, 833 & 869 Virginia Ave. NE (NPU-F)	2.8 acres (1.13 ha)	Neighborhood park; Northeast Atlanta
John Wesley Dobbs Park	Fort Street & Auburn Ave (NPU-M)	1.3 acres (0.53 ha)	Neighborhood park; Downtown area
Kathryn Johnston Memorial Park	870 Proctor Street NW (NPU-Y)	2.5 acres (1.01 ha)	Neighborhood park; Northwest Atlanta
Knight Park	1194 Church St. NW (NPU-K)	2.68 acres (1.08 ha)	Neighborhood park; Northwest Atlanta
Lake Claire Park	430 Lakeshore Dr. (NPU-N)	4.7 acres (1.90 ha)	Neighborhood park; East Atlanta
Lenox-Wildwood Park	1760 Lenox Rd. NE (NPU-F)	8.47 acres (3.43 ha)	Neighborhood park; Northeast Atlanta
Lillian Cooper Shepherd Park	2886 Argyle Dr. NW (NPU-G)	2.3 acres (0.93 ha)	Neighborhood park; Northwest Atlanta
Loring Heights Park	Loring Dr. / Garden Lane NW (NPU-E)	1.9 acres (0.77 ha)	Neighborhood park; Midtown Atlanta
Louise Howard Park	471 Collier Drive NE (NPU-C)	5.5 acres (2.23 ha)	Neighborhood park; North Atlanta
Lucius D. Simon, Sr. Memorial Park	Gammon St. SE at Bisbee Ave. (NPU-Y)	11.053 acres (4.47 ha)	Neighborhood park; South Atlanta
Macon Drive Park	Macon Drive at Mt. Zion Road (NPU-Y)	1 acre (0.40 ha)	Neighborhood park; South Atlanta
Mattie Freeland Park	612 Echo Street NW (NPU-L)	0.7 acres (0.28 ha)	Neighborhood park; Northwest Atlanta
McClatchey Park	Avery Dr. / Westminister Dr. NE (NPU-E)	5 acres (2.02 ha)	Neighborhood park; Midtown Atlanta
Melvin Drive Park	3895 Melvin Drive SW (NPU-P)	48.9 acres (19.79 ha)	Neighborhood park; Southwest Atlanta
Orme Park	795 Brookridge Dr. NE (NPU-F)	6.6 acres (2.67 ha)	Neighborhood park; Northeast Atlanta
Phoenix II Park	141 Martin St. SE / Georgia Ave. (NPU-V)	7.3 acres (2.95 ha)	Neighborhood park; Southeast Atlanta
Phoenix III Park	Georgia Ave. / Connally St. SE (NPU-V)	4 acres (1.62 ha)	Neighborhood park; Southeast Atlanta
Rawson-Washington Park	Connally St. / Kelly St. NE (NPU-V)	4.5 acres (1.82 ha)	Neighborhood park; Southeast Atlanta
Renaissance Park	Piedmont Ave. / Pine St. NE (NPU-M)	5.4 acres (2.19 ha)	Neighborhood park; Downtown area
Rose Circle Park	Rose Circle / White Street SW (NPU-T)	2.7 acres (1.09 ha)	Neighborhood park; Southwest Atlanta
Shadyside Park	1635 Ponce de Leon Ave. NE (NPU-N)	4.07 acres (1.65 ha)	Neighborhood park; East Atlanta
Shady Valley Park	2720 Shady Valley Dr. NE (NPU-B)	11.08 acres (4.48 ha)	Neighborhood park; Northeast Atlanta
Sidney Marcus Park	786 Cumberland Rd. NE (NPU-F)	2.69 acres (1.09 ha)	Neighborhood park; Northeast Atlanta
Springvale Park	Euclid Ave. / Waverly Way NE (NPU-N)	4.6 acres (1.86 ha)	Neighborhood park; East Atlanta
Stone Hogan Park	Stone Hogan Rd. SW / St Hogan Conn. SW (NPU-R)	10.5 acres (4.25 ha)	Neighborhood park; Southwest Atlanta
Tanyard Creek Park	Collier Rd. NW / Walthall Dr. NW (NPU-C)	14.5 acres (5.87 ha)	Neighborhood park; North Atlanta
Tullwater Park	680 McWilliams Rd. SE (NPU-Z)	5.37 acres (2.17 ha)	Neighborhood park; Southeast Atlanta
Underwood Hills Park	1845 Harper St. NW (NPU-D)	10.7 acres (4.33 ha)	Neighborhood park; North Atlanta
Walker Park	Memorial Dr. SE / Memorial Ter. SE (NPU-O)	7.02 acres (2.84 ha)	Neighborhood park; East Atlanta
West Cascade Park	4391 Danforth Rd SW (NPU-Q)	12.42 acres (5.03 ha)	Neighborhood park; Southwest Atlanta
West End Park	1111 Oak St. SW (NPU-T)	6.37 acres (2.58 ha)	Neighborhood park; Southwest Atlanta
West Lake and Boone Park	Joseph E. Boone Blvd & W. Lake Ave (NPU-J)	1.24 acres (0.50 ha)	Neighborhood park; Northwest Atlanta
Whittier Mill Park	Spad Ave. NW / Wales Ave. NW (NPU-D)	22 acres (8.90 ha)	Neighborhood park; North Atlanta
Wilson Mill Park	300 Wilson Mill Rd. SW (NPU-H)	35.5 acres (14.37 ha)	Neighborhood park; Southwest Atlanta
Winn Park	Westminister Dr. NE / Lafayette Dr. NE (NPU-E)	10.3 acres (4.17 ha)	Neighborhood park; Midtown Atlanta
Yonah Park	Yonah Dr. NE / 15th St. NE (NPU-E)	1.9 acres (0.77 ha)	Neighborhood park; Midtown Atlanta
Indian Creek Park	3162 Lenox Rd (NPU-B)	4 acres (1.62 ha)	Neighborhood park; Northeast Atlanta

== Nature Preserves ==
Park Name	Location / Address	Acreage	Notes / Facilities
17th Street Park	138 17th Street NE (NPU-E)	2.3 acres (0.93 ha)	Nature preserve; Midtown area
Alexander Park	E. Wesley Rd. / Alexander Dr. NW (NPU-B)	11.6 acres (4.69 ha)	Nature preserve; North Atlanta
Beecher Triangle	Beecher Cir. / Beecher Rd. SW (NPU-I)	0.02 acres (0.01 ha)	Nature preserve; Small greenspace
Blue Heron Nature Preserve	4055 Roswell Rd NE (NPU-B)	30 acres (12.14 ha)	Nature preserve; Large protected area northeast Atlanta
Cascade Springs Nature Preserve	2852 Cascade Rd. SW (NPU-I)	120 acres (48.56 ha)	Nature preserve; Large southwest Atlanta preserve
Dale Creek Park	Dale Creek Dr. NW (NPU-I)	3.2 acres (1.29 ha)	Nature preserve; Northwest Atlanta
Daniel Johnson Nature Preserve	Beech Valley Rd NE (NPU-F)	8 acres (3.24 ha)	Nature preserve; Northeast Atlanta
Herbert Greene Boulder Park Drive	Boulder Park Drive at Dollar Mill Rd. SW (NPU-H)	56.44 acres (22.84 ha)	Nature preserve; Large southwest Atlanta area
Herbert Taylor Park	1795 Johnson Rd. NE (NPU-F)	26 acres (10.52 ha)	Nature preserve; Northeast Atlanta
Jennie Drake Park	645 Waterford Road (NPU-I)	2.91 acres (1.18 ha)	Nature preserve; West Atlanta area
Kirkwood Urban Forest	Dixie St. SE / Rogers St. / Bixby St. (NPU-O)	5.7 acres (2.31 ha)	Nature preserve; East Atlanta forest
Klaus park and Preserve	2010 Cornell Blvd (NPU-H)	10.3 acres (4.17 ha)	Nature preserve; Southwest Atlanta
Lake Charlotte Nature Preserve	Forest Park Rd SE (NPU-Z)	0 acres (0.00 ha)	Nature preserve; Southeast Atlanta (acreage data incomplete)
Lionel Hampton Willis Mill Rd	Willis Mill Rd. SW (NPU-I)	48.44 acres (19.60 ha)	Nature preserve; Large southwest Atlanta preserve
Mantissa Road	Mantissa St. & Cambria Ave. (NPU-D)	2 acres (0.81 ha)	Nature preserve; North Atlanta
Mayson Park	4417 Club Drive NE (NPU-B)	3.1 acres (1.25 ha)	Nature preserve; Northeast Atlanta
Mayson Ravine	E. Club Lane (NPU-B)	2.7 acres (1.09 ha)	Nature preserve; Northeast Atlanta
Morningside Nature Preserve	Cheshire Bridge Rd. NE / Woodcliffe Ter. / Wildwood Rd (NPU-F)	34.38 acres (13.91 ha)	Nature preserve; Large northeast Atlanta preserve
Mount Zion Nature Preserve	Forest Park Rd SE (NPU-Y)	34.39 acres (13.92 ha)	Nature preserve; Large south Atlanta preserve
North Camp Creek Parkway Nature Preserve	3380 Stone Rd. SW (NPU-P)	40.3 acres (16.31 ha)	Nature preserve; Large southwest Atlanta area
Oak Knoll I Park	Oak Knoll Cir. / Oaknoll Terr. SE (NPU-Y)	1.07 acres (0.43 ha)	Nature preserve; South Atlanta
Oak Knoll II Park	Oak Knoll Cir. SE (NPU-Y)	0.56 acres (0.23 ha)	Nature preserve; Small south Atlanta preserve
Outdoor Activity Center	1442 Richland Rd. SW (NPU-S)	21.76 acres (8.81 ha)	Nature preserve; Southwest Atlanta recreation area
Peachtree Park Nature Trail	751 Burke Rd (NPU-B)	1.5 acres (0.61 ha)	Nature preserve; Northeast Atlanta trail
Rockdale Park	Habershal Dr. / Johnson Rd. NW (NPU-G)	21.1 acres (8.54 ha)	Nature preserve; Large northwest Atlanta area
Sibley Park	W. Wesley Rd. / Habersham Rd. NW (NPU-B)	1.6 acres (0.65 ha)	Nature preserve; North Atlanta
South River Nature Preserve	Pryor Road (NPU-Z)	11.7 acres (4.73 ha)	Nature preserve; South Atlanta area
Southwest Nature Preserve	Southwest Atlanta (NPU-H)	178.4 acres (72.20 ha)	Nature preserve; Large southwest Atlanta preserve
Spring Valley Park	Spring Valley Rd. / Meredith Dr. NW (NPU-C)	3.55 acres (1.44 ha)	Nature preserve; North Atlanta
Springlake Park	Northside Dr. / Norfleet Rd. / Springlake Dr. NW (NPU-C)	5.2 acres (2.10 ha)	Nature preserve; North Atlanta
Standing Peachtree Park	2566 Chattahoochee Circle NW (NPU-A)	15 acres (6.07 ha)	Nature preserve; North Atlanta area
Sunnybrook Park	Pinetree Dr. NE / Brentwood Dr. NE (NPU-B)	2.4 acres (0.97 ha)	Nature preserve; Northeast Atlanta
Swann Preserve	Swan Drive SE / Meador Ave. (NPU-Y)	18.03 acres (7.30 ha)	Nature preserve; South Atlanta
Tanyard Creek Urban Forest	473 Wilson Mill Rd SW (NPU-I)	53 acres (21.45 ha)	Nature preserve; Large southwest Atlanta area
Tatum Lakes Nature Preserve	473 Wilson Mill Road SW (NPU-I)	53 acres (21.45 ha)	Nature preserve; Large southwest Atlanta area
Utoy Creek Nature Preserve	Benjamin E. Mays Drive (NPU-I)	27.56 acres (11.15 ha)	Nature preserve; Large southwest Atlanta area
Vermont Road Park	Vermont Rd. NE / Calvert Lane NE (NPU-B)	2 acres (0.81 ha)	Nature preserve; Northeast Atlanta
West Wesley Park	59 W. Wesley Rd. NW (NPU-B)	1.13 acres (0.46 ha)	Nature preserve; North Atlanta
Wildwood Gardens Park	735 Wildwood Rd. NE (NPU-F)	1.56 acres (0.63 ha)	Nature preserve; Northeast Atlanta
Woodward Way Park	Habersham Rd. NW / Woodward Way NW (NPU-C)	1.67 acres (0.68 ha)	Nature preserve; North Atlanta
Whetstone Creek Park	2329 Adams Drive (NPU-D)	2.33 acres (0.94 ha)	Nature preserve; North Atlanta

== Trail Corridors ==
Park Name	Location / Address	Acreage	Notes / Facilities
650 Canterbury Rd	650 Canterbury Rd (NPU-L)	1.4 acres (0.57 ha)	Trail corridor; East Atlanta
Eastside Trail	Atlanta (NPU-area)	2 acres (0.81 ha)	Trail corridor; East Atlanta trail system
Haynes Manor Park	Northside Dr. / Sagamore Dr. / Peachtree Battle Ave. (NPU-C)	2.98 acres (1.21 ha)	Trail corridor; North Atlanta
Lanier Boulevard Parkway	Lanier Blvd. NE (NPU-F)	2.1 acres (0.85 ha)	Trail corridor; Northeast Atlanta
Little Nancy Creek Park	Peachtree Dunwoody & Winall Road (NPU-B)	5 acres (2.02 ha)	Trail corridor; North Atlanta area
North Fork Trail	Cheshire and Lindbergh (NPU-area)	6 acres (2.43 ha)	Trail corridor; East Atlanta trail
West End Trail	Rose Circle / White Street (NPU-area)	4 acres (1.62 ha)	Trail corridor; Southwest Atlanta trail
Peachtree Battle Parkway	Peachtree Battle Av. NW / Ptree-Dellwood Dr. (NPU-C)	4.22 acres (1.71 ha)	Trail corridor; North Atlanta
Memorial Drive Greenway	234 Memorial Drive SE (NPU-area)	5 acres (2.02 ha)	Trail corridor; East Atlanta greenway

== Playlots & Greenspots ==
Park Name	Location / Address	Acreage	Notes / Facilities
25th Street Median	25th St. / Alden Ave. / Standish Ave. NW (NPU-E)	0.11 acres (0.04 ha)	Greenspot; Midtown area
70 Boulevard Pedal Park	70 Boulevard (NPU-E)	0 acres (0.00 ha)	Greenspot; East Atlanta
Abner Place Park	2539 Abner Pl. NW (NPU-G)	0.37 acres (0.15 ha)	Greenspot; Northwest Atlanta
Adamsville Triangle	Fairburn / MLK Jr. Dr. / Bakers Ferry Rd. (NPU-H)	0.05 acres (0.02 ha)	Greenspot; Southwest Atlanta
Ardmore Park	Ardmore Rd. off Collier Rd. NW (NPU-E)	1.74 acres (0.70 ha)	Playlot; North Atlanta
Armand Park	2177 Armand Rd (NPU-F)	1.1 acres (0.45 ha)	Playlot; Northeast Atlanta
Arlington Circle Playlot	Arlington Cir. / North Ave. NW (NPU-J)	0.49 acres (0.20 ha)	Playlot; Northwest Atlanta
Ashby Circle Playlot	Ashby Cir. off Mayson Turner Rd. NW (NPU-K)	0.87 acres (0.35 ha)	Playlot; Northwest Atlanta
Ashview Triangle	Westview Dr. / Agnes Jones Pl. SW (NPU-T)	0.11 acres (0.04 ha)	Greenspot; Southwest Atlanta
Atwood Street Park	Atwood St. / White St. SW (NPU-T)	0.05 acres (0.02 ha)	Greenspot; Southwest Atlanta
Barclay Median	Barclay Place / E. Rock Springs NE (NPU-F)	0.31 acres (0.13 ha)	Greenspot; Northeast Atlanta
Beech Valley Triangle	Beech Valley Rd. NE / Beech Val. Way (NPU-F)	0.36 acres (0.15 ha)	Greenspot; Northeast Atlanta
Benton Place Garden	Benton Place / Rilman Dr. NW (NPU-A)	0.04 acres (0.02 ha)	Greenspot; North Atlanta
Beverly-Avery Circle	Beverly Rd. / Avery Cir. NE (NPU-E)	0.03 acres (0.01 ha)	Greenspot; Midtown
Beverly-Avery Triangle	Beverly Rd. / Avery Dr. NE (NPU-E)	0.04 acres (0.02 ha)	Greenspot; Midtown
Beverly-Montgomery Ferry Triangle	Beverly Rd. / Montgomery Ferry Dr. NE (NPU-E)	0.02 acres (0.01 ha)	Greenspot; Midtown
Beverly-Polo Triangle	Beverly Rd. / Polo Dr. NE (NPU-E)	0.02 acres (0.01 ha)	Greenspot; Midtown
Billings Circle	Billings Ave. SE (NPU-Z)	0.03 acres (0.01 ha)	Greenspot; Southeast Atlanta
Birchwood-Arlene Triangle	Birchwood Dr. / Arlene Way NE (NPU-B)	0.05 acres (0.02 ha)	Greenspot; Northeast Atlanta
Bonnie Brae Park	Tift Ave / Bonnie Brae Ave. SW (NPU-V)	0.19 acres (0.08 ha)	Playlot; Southeast Atlanta
Boulevard-Angier Park	Boulevard / Angier Ave. NE (NPU-M)	0.18 acres (0.07 ha)	Playlot; Downtown area
Bridges Walkway	Bridges Avenue SW (NPU-area)	12 acres (4.86 ha)	Walkway feature
Broadland and West Conway Park	Broadland Rd. NW / W. Conway Dr. (NPU-A)	0.09 acres (0.04 ha)	Greenspot; North Atlanta
Browns Mill/McWilliams Park	Browns Mill Rd. / McWilliams Rd. SE (NPU-Z)	0.04 acres (0.02 ha)	Greenspot; Southeast Atlanta
Capitol View Garden	Athens Avenue (NPU-X)	0.3 acres (0.12 ha)	Greenspot; South Atlanta
Carver Circle	off Tiger Flowers Dr. NW (NPU-J)	0.02 acres (0.01 ha)	Greenspot; Northwest Atlanta
Castlewood Triangle	Castlewood Dr. NW / Edinboro Rd. (NPU-C)	0.41 acres (0.17 ha)	Greenspot; North Atlanta
Cativo and Dogwood Beauty Spot	Cativo Dr. / Dogwood Ct. (NPU-I)	0.02 acres (0.01 ha)	Greenspot; Southwest Atlanta
Cativo Circle	700 Cativo Dr. SW (NPU-I)	0.03 acres (0.01 ha)	Greenspot; Southwest Atlanta
Channing Valley Park	Channing Dr. / Sunbury Pl. NW (NPU-C)	0.58 acres (0.23 ha)	Playlot; North Atlanta
Charles Allen Median	Charles Allen Dr. NE (NPU-E)	0.32 acres (0.13 ha)	Greenspot; Midtown
Charles L. Harper Memorial Park	Ashby St. / Mayson Turner Rd. NW (NPU-L)	1.1 acres (0.45 ha)	Plaza; Northwest Atlanta
Charlie Loudermilk Park	Peachtree Rd / Roswell Rd NW (NPU-B)	0.52 acres (0.21 ha)	Plaza; North Atlanta
Chatham and Avon Park	Avon Ave. / Chatham Rd. (NPU-S)	0.05 acres (0.02 ha)	Greenspot; Southwest Atlanta
Chattahoochee Brick	3195 Brick Plant Road (NPU-E)	75.47 acres (30.54 ha)	Park in Holding; North Atlanta
Club Drive Park	Club Dr. / Davidson Ave. NE (NPU-B)	0.08 acres (0.03 ha)	Greenspot; Northeast Atlanta
Collum Circle Beauty Spot	200 Block Collum St. NW (NPU-J)	0.05 acres (0.02 ha)	Greenspot; Northwest Atlanta
Cumberlander Ivan Hill	Circle at Lynhurst Dr. SW (NPU-I)	8.67 acres (3.51 ha)	Park in Holding; Southwest Atlanta
Darlington Circle Park	Darlington Cir. NE (NPU-B)	0.06 acres (0.02 ha)	Greenspot; Northeast Atlanta
Davidson and Lakehaven Park	Davidson Ave. / Lakehaven Dr. NE (NPU-B)	0.05 acres (0.02 ha)	Greenspot; Northeast Atlanta
John Davis Park	Ontario Ave. / Stokes Ave. SW (NPU-T)	0.07 acres (0.03 ha)	Greenspot; Southwest Atlanta
Defoors Ferry Park	2400 Defoors Ferry Rd (NPU-D)	6 acres (2.43 ha)	Park in Holding; North Atlanta
Dean Rusk Park	Sells Ave. / Lawton St. SW (NPU-T)	6 acres (2.43 ha)	Neighborhood park; Southwest Atlanta
Delta Park	Edgewood Ave. / Delta Place NE (NPU-N)	0.22 acres (0.09 ha)	Greenspot; East Atlanta
Dill Avenue Park	Manford Rd. / Mellview Ave. SE (NPU-X)	0.09 acres (0.04 ha)	Greenspot; South Atlanta
Dollar Mill Median	Boulder Park Dr. / Dollar Mill Rd. (NPU-H)	0.24 acres (0.10 ha)	Greenspot; Southwest Atlanta
E. Club and Lakehaven Park	E. Club Lane / Lakehaven Dr. NE (NPU-B)	0.01 acres (0.00 ha)	Greenspot; Northeast Atlanta
E. Pine Valley and W. Pine Valley Park	E. Pine Valley Rd. / W Pine Valley Rd. NW (NPU-C)	0.04 acres (0.02 ha)	Greenspot; North Atlanta
E. Rock Springs Triangle	E. Rock Springs Rd. / N Pelham Rd. NE (NPU-F)	0.12 acres (0.05 ha)	Greenspot; Northeast Atlanta
East Andrews and Roswell Park	E. Andrews Dr. NW / Roswell Rd. (NPU-B)	0.01 acres (0.00 ha)	Greenspot; North Atlanta
East Brookhaven and Lakehaven Park	E. Brookhaven Dr / Lakehaven Dr NE (NPU-B)	0.05 acres (0.02 ha)	Greenspot; Northeast Atlanta
Eastwood/Emerson Triangle	Eastwood Av. / Emerson Av. SE (NPU-W)	0.03 acres (0.01 ha)	Greenspot; East Atlanta
Edgewater Circle	2440 Edgewater Dr. SW (NPU-I)	0.03 acres (0.01 ha)	Greenspot; Southwest Atlanta
Edwin Place Park	Edwin Place / Bankhead Hwy. NW (NPU-J)	4.29 acres (1.74 ha)	Greenspot; Northwest Atlanta
Elinor Place Park	Elinor Place / Bankhead Hwy. NW (NPU-J)	0.6 acres (0.24 ha)	Greenspot; Northwest Atlanta
Ella Mae Wade Brayboy Memorial Park	1210 Lena Street / Burbank and Lena Street SW (NPU-K)	2.33 acres (0.94 ha)	Neighborhood park; Northwest Atlanta
Ellsworth Park	Howell Mill Rd. / Collier Rd. NW (NPU-C)	1.27 acres (0.51 ha)	Greenspot; North Atlanta
Emma Lane	Emma Lane NE (NPU-B)	8.8 acres (3.56 ha)	Park in Holding; Northeast Atlanta
Enota Place Playlot	Enota Place / Sells Ave. SW (NPU-T)	0.31 acres (0.13 ha)	Community playlot; Southwest Atlanta
Findley Plaza	Euclid Ave / Moreland Ave. NE (NPU-N)	0.11 acres (0.04 ha)	Plaza; East Atlanta
Fire Station #5 Park	Trinity Ave. SW / Spring St. (NPU-M)	0.08 acres (0.03 ha)	Greenspot; Downtown area
Folk Art (Courtland) Park	Courtland St. / Ralph McGill Ave. (NPU-M)	0.5 acres (0.20 ha)	Plaza; Downtown area
Folk Art (Piedmont) Park	Piedmont Ave. NE (NPU-M)	0.3 acres (0.12 ha)	Plaza; Downtown area
Forest Park Road Park	3724 Forest Park Road SE (NPU-Z)	3.76 acres (1.52 ha)	Park in Holding; Southeast Atlanta
Fountain Drive #1	1114 Morris Brown Dr. SW (NPU-T)	0.01 acres (0.00 ha)	Greenspot; Southwest Atlanta
Fountain Drive #2	Morris Brown Dr. SW (NPU-T)	0.02 acres (0.01 ha)	Greenspot; Southwest Atlanta
Fountainebleau Beauty Spot	Hogan Rd. / The Fontainebleau SW (NPU-R)	0.04 acres (0.02 ha)	Greenspot; Southwest Atlanta
Fulton-Pryor Island	Fulton St. / Pryor St. SE (NPU-V)	0.12 acres (0.05 ha)	Community area; Downtown area
Georgian Terrace Park	2170 Old Georgian Terrace (NPU-D)	2.64 acres (1.07 ha)	Park in Holding; North Atlanta
Glenwood Triangle	Wilkinson Dr. / Glenwood Ave. / I-20 (NPU-O)	0.05 acres (0.02 ha)	Greenspot; East Atlanta
Gordon-White Park	Gordon St. / White St. SW (NPU-T)	1.7 acres (0.69 ha)	Greenspot; Southwest Atlanta
Green Leaf Circle	202 Napolean Dr. SW (NPU-T)	0.99 acres (0.40 ha)	Greenspot; Southwest Atlanta
Greenwood-Charles Allen Triangle	Greenwood Av. / Charles Allen Dr. NE (NPU-E)	0.04 acres (0.02 ha)	Greenspot; Midtown
Greenbriar	2841 Greenbriar Pkwy. SW (NPU-R)	7.05 acres (2.85 ha)	Park in Holding; Southwest Atlanta
Harold Avenue Place	595 Harold Avenue (NPU-area)	5 acres (2.02 ha)	Greenspace; West Atlanta
Haven Ridge	Haven Ridge Drive (NPU-area)	8 acres (3.24 ha)	Greenspace; West Atlanta
Havilon Triangle	Havilon Dr. / S. Alvarado Ter. SW (NPU-S)	0.27 acres (0.11 ha)	Greenspot; Southwest Atlanta
Helen Drive Park	Helen Dr. / Kay Lane NE (NPU-F)	0.02 acres (0.01 ha)	Greenspot; Northeast Atlanta
Heritage Park (Founder's)	Crumley St. SE (NPU-V)	0.67 acres (0.27 ha)	Greenspot; Southeast Atlanta
Hickory Grove Park	Homestead Ave. / Inverness Ave. NE (NPU-F)	0.41 acres (0.17 ha)	Greenspot; Northeast Atlanta
Hill Street Beauty Spot	Hill St. / Memorial Dr. SE (NPU-W)	0.07 acres (0.03 ha)	Greenspot; East Atlanta
Hillside at Northside Drive Park	Hillside Dr. / Northside Dr. NW (NPU-A)	0.38 acres (0.15 ha)	Greenspot; North Atlanta
Holderness/Lucile Park	471 Holderness Ave. SW (NPU-T)	0.17 acres (0.07 ha)	Greenspot; Southwest Atlanta
Holly Street Park	1237 Holly Street (NPU-E)	0 acres (0.00 ha)	Playlot/Park In-Holding
Home Park	1015 Tumlin St. / Calhoun St. NW (NPU-E)	1.8 acres (0.73 ha)	Community park; Midtown area
Homestead Park	Meadowdale Av. / Homestead Av. NE (NPU-F)	0.15 acres (0.06 ha)	Greenspot; Northeast Atlanta
Howard Park	471 Collier Drive NE (NPU-area)	8 acres (3.24 ha)	Neighborhood park; North Atlanta
Howell Mill at Beaverbrook Park	Howell Mill Rd / Beaverbrook Dr NW (NPU-C)	0.05 acres (0.02 ha)	Greenspot; North Atlanta
Howell Mill at Glenbrook Park	Howell Mill Rd. / Glenbrook Dr. NW (NPU-C)	0.02 acres (0.01 ha)	Greenspot; North Atlanta
Howell Park	983 Ralph David Abernathy Blvd. SW (NPU-T)	2.1 acres (0.85 ha)	Neighborhood park; Southwest Atlanta
Hurt Park	25 Courtland St. NE (NPU-M)	1.87 acres (0.76 ha)	Plaza; Historic downtown civic space; Anchors downtown lunch crowd gathering
Hutchens Road Park	640 Hutchens Road (NPU-Z)	0.99 acres (0.40 ha)	Playlot/Park In-Holding; Southeast Atlanta
Inman Circle at 17th St Park	Inman Cir. / 17th Street NE (NPU-E)	0.03 acres (0.01 ha)	Greenspot; Midtown
Inman Park	Euclid Ave. / Edgewood Ave. NE (NPU-N)	0.28 acres (0.11 ha)	Greenspot; East Atlanta
Jacci Fuller Woodland Garden Park	Gilbert St. / United Ave SE (NPU-W)	0.64 acres (0.26 ha)	Playlot; East Atlanta
John Calhoun Park	170 Auburn Ave. NE (NPU-M)	0.28 acres (0.11 ha)	Plaza; Downtown area
Jonesboro Triangle	Jonesboro Rd. / Hutchens Rd. SE (NPU-Z)	0.16 acres (0.06 ha)	Greenspot; Southeast Atlanta
June Elois Mundy	Walnut St. NW (NPU-L)	1.44 acres (0.58 ha)	Playlot; Northwest Atlanta
Kimpson Park	97 Thirkeld Ave. SE (NPU-Y)	0.55 acres (0.22 ha)	Playlot; South Atlanta
Kirkwood Dickson	Woodbine Ave. SE (NPU-O)	0.67 acres (0.27 ha)	Greenspot; East Atlanta
Lafayette-15th Street Triangle	Lafayette Dr. / 15th Street NE (NPU-E)	0.04 acres (0.02 ha)	Greenspot; Midtown
Larchmont Circle	Larchmont Dr. / Larchmont Cir. NW (NPU-I)	0.02 acres (0.01 ha)	Greenspot; Southwest Atlanta
Leathers Circle	Porter Dr. NW (NPU-J)	0.06 acres (0.02 ha)	Greenspot; Northwest Atlanta
Lenox and Johnson Road Park	Lenox Rd. / Johnson Rd. NE (NPU-F)	0.05 acres (0.02 ha)	Greenspot; Northeast Atlanta
Lenox Beauty Spot	Roxboro Circle NE (NPU-B)	0.08 acres (0.03 ha)	Greenspot; Northeast Atlanta
Lindsay Street Park	539-541 Lindsay St (NPU-area)	3 acres (1.21 ha)	Neighborhood park; West Atlanta
Loridans Park	700 Loridans Dr NE (NPU-B)	1.11 acres (0.45 ha)	Park in Holding; Northeast Atlanta
Loring Heights Park	Loring Dr. / Garden Lane NW (NPU-E)	1.9 acres (0.77 ha)	Neighborhood park; Midtown
Lucile Avenue	Lucile Avenue (NPU-area)	4 acres (1.62 ha)	Greenspace; West Atlanta
Lower Paul Park	2388 Paul Ave NW (NPU-D)	17 acres (6.88 ha)	Park in Holding; North Atlanta
M.L.K. Natatorium & Recreation Ctr	110 Hilliard St SE (NPU-area)	5 acres (2.02 ha)	Recreation center; Southeast Atlanta
Maddox-Avery Triangle	Maddox Dr. / Avery Dr. NE (NPU-E)	0.05 acres (0.02 ha)	Greenspot; Midtown
Magnum and Lynhurst Park	Mangum Lane / Lynhurst Dr. SW (NPU-I)	0.1 acres (0.04 ha)	Greenspot; Southwest Atlanta
Manigault Street Playlot	1000 Manigault St. SE (NPU-N)	0.22 acres (0.09 ha)	Playlot; East Atlanta
Margaret Mitchell Square	Peachtree St. / Forsyth St. NW (NPU-M)	0.04 acres (0.02 ha)	Plaza; Downtown area
Marietta Street Island	Marietta St. / Broad St. / Fairlie St. NW (NPU-M)	0.17 acres (0.07 ha)	Greenspot; Downtown area
Martin Luther King Jr. Playlot	Jackson Street (NPU-M)	1.6 acres (0.65 ha)	Greenspot; Downtown area
Matilda Place Park	Matilda Place NW / Bankhead Hwy. (NPU-J)	1.27 acres (0.51 ha)	Greenspot; Northwest Atlanta
Mayflower Beauty Spot	Mayflower Ave. / Cascade Av. to Ocala SW (NPU-S)	0.25 acres (0.10 ha)	Greenspot; Southwest Atlanta
Mayor's #1 Park	Peachtree St. / Ralph McGill Blvd. NE (NPU-M)	0.22 acres (0.09 ha)	Greenspot; Downtown area
McKay Circle	McCay Dr. SE (NPU-Z)	0.04 acres (0.02 ha)	Greenspot; Southeast Atlanta
McKinley-Wilson Circle	McKinley Rd. / Wilson Rd. NW (NPU-C)	0.05 acres (0.02 ha)	Greenspot; North Atlanta
Mitchell-Haynes Park	Haynes St. / Mitchell-MLK Conn. SW (NPU-M)	0.08 acres (0.03 ha)	Greenspot; Downtown area
Montgomery Ferry/Golf Cir. Triangle	Montgomery Ferry Rd. / Golf Cir. NE (NPU-E)	0.02 acres (0.01 ha)	Greenspot; Midtown
Monument Beauty Spot	Monument Ave. / McPherson Ave. SE (NPU-W)	0.03 acres (0.01 ha)	Greenspot; East Atlanta
Moores Mill-Northside Pkwy Triangle	Moores Mill Rd. / N'side Pkwy. NW (NPU-C)	0.03 acres (0.01 ha)	Greenspot; North Atlanta
Moreland Avenue Planters	Moreland Ave. / McPherson Ave. SE (NPU-W)	0.05 acres (0.02 ha)	Greenspot; East Atlanta
Morgan-Boulevard Park	521 Boulevard NE (NPU-M)	0.39 acres (0.16 ha)	Greenspot; Downtown area
Mornington Circle	Mornington Dr. NW (NPU-C)	0.16 acres (0.06 ha)	Greenspot; North Atlanta
Mountain Way Common	4124 N Ivy Rd NE (NPU-area)	7 acres (2.83 ha)	Common area; Northeast Atlanta
Mt. Paran and Northside Park	Mt Paran Rd. / Northside Dr. NW (NPU-A)	0.22 acres (0.09 ha)	Greenspot; North Atlanta
Mt. Paran Rd. at Cave Rd. Triangle	1880 Mt. Paran Rd. NW (NPU-A)	0.23 acres (0.09 ha)	Greenspot; North Atlanta
Muscogee Park (Brookline)	Brookline St. / Elbert St. SW (NPU-V)	0.06 acres (0.02 ha)	Greenspot; Southeast Atlanta
Noble Park	1710 Noble Dr. NE (NPU-F)	0.4 acres (0.16 ha)	Playlot; Northeast Atlanta
North Buckhead Park	Phipps Blvd. / Wieuca Rd. NE (NPU-B)	0.13 acres (0.05 ha)	Greenspot; North Atlanta
North Evelyn Place Park	N. Evelyn Place NW / Bankhead Hwy. (NPU-J)	0.87 acres (0.35 ha)	Greenspot; Northwest Atlanta
North Highland Terrace Park	N. Highland Terr. NE (NPU-F)	0.04 acres (0.02 ha)	Greenspot; Northeast Atlanta
Northcliffe and Brookview Park	Northcliffe Dr. NW / Brookview Dr. NW (NPU-C)	0.02 acres (0.01 ha)	Greenspot; North Atlanta
Oakview I Park	Oakview Rd. / Douglas St. SE (NPU-O)	0.45 acres (0.18 ha)	Greenspot; East Atlanta
Oakview II Park	Oakview Rd. / Second Ave. SE (NPU-O)	0.61 acres (0.25 ha)	Greenspot; East Atlanta
Old Ivy Road Park	519 Old Ivy Road NE (NPU-G)	0.66 acres (0.27 ha)	Playlot; North Atlanta
Ontario Park	Ontario Ave. / Stokes Ave. SW (NPU-T)	0.074 acres (0.03 ha)	Greenspot; Southwest Atlanta
Oriole Park	Oriole Dr. SW (NPU-I)	0.095 acres (0.04 ha)	Greenspot; Southwest Atlanta
Ormewood Forest	770 Shadowridge Dr SE (NPU-W)	3.188 acres (1.29 ha)	Park in Holding; East Atlanta
Orme Triangle	Orme Circle / Elkmont Dr. NE (NPU-F)	0.04 acres (0.02 ha)	Greenspot; Northeast Atlanta
Ormond-Grant Park	Ormond St. / Grant St. SE (NPU-W)	1.3 acres (0.53 ha)	Playlot; East Atlanta
Parkway-Angier Park	Parkway / Angier Ave. NE (NPU-M)	0.49 acres (0.20 ha)	Playlot; Downtown area
Parkway-Merritts Park	Parkway Dr. / Merritts Ave. NE (NPU-M)	0.67 acres (0.27 ha)	Playlot; Downtown area
Parkway-Wabash Park	391 Parkway Dr. NE / Wabash Ave. (NPU-M)	0.6 acres (0.24 ha)	Playlot; Downtown area
Peachtree at 15th St. Park	Peachtree St. / 15th Street NE (NPU-E)	0.05 acres (0.02 ha)	Greenspot; Midtown
Peachtree Cir. at 15th St. Triangle	Peachtree Cir. / 15th Street NE (NPU-E)	0.11 acres (0.04 ha)	Greenspot; Midtown
Pelham Road Park	E. Pelham Rd. / Piedmont Rd. NE (NPU-F)	0.09 acres (0.04 ha)	Greenspot; Northeast Atlanta
Pershing Point Park	Peachtree St. / W. P'tree St. NE (NPU-E)	0.33 acres (0.13 ha)	Greenspot; Midtown
Pharr Circle Park	N. Pharr Ct. NW (NPU-B)	0.28 acres (0.11 ha)	Greenspot; North Atlanta
Piedmont Harris Park	Harris at Piedmont (NPU-M)	1 acre (0.40 ha)	Greenspot; Downtown area
Piedmont Heights Park	Montgomery Ferry Rd. / Pelham Rd. (NPU-F)	0.03 acres (0.01 ha)	Greenspot; Northeast Atlanta
Piedmont Road Triangle	Piedmont Rd. / Elliott Circle NE (NPU-B)	0.01 acres (0.00 ha)	Greenspot; North Atlanta
Piedmont-Avery Triangle	Piedmont Ave. / Avery Dr. NE (NPU-E)	0.04 acres (0.02 ha)	Greenspot; Midtown
Pinetree and Brentwood Park	Pinetree Dr. / Brentwood Dr. NE (NPU-B)	0.08 acres (0.03 ha)	Greenspot; North Atlanta
Pollard and Albany Beauty Spot	1468 Pollard Dr. / Albany Dr. SW (NPU-R)	0.09 acres (0.04 ha)	Greenspot; Southwest Atlanta
Prado at 17th St Triangle	The Prado / 17th Street NE (NPU-E)	0.13 acres (0.05 ha)	Greenspot; Midtown
Prado at Inman Circle Park	The Prado / Inman Circle NE (NPU-E)	0.4 acres (0.16 ha)	Greenspot; Midtown
Prado-Maddox Triangle	The Prado / Maddox Dr. NE (NPU-E)	0.13 acres (0.05 ha)	Greenspot; Midtown
Prado-Peachtree Circle Triangle	The Prado / Peachtree Circle NE (NPU-E)	0.05 acres (0.02 ha)	Greenspot; Midtown
Prado-Piedmont Beauty Spot	The Prado / Piedmont Rd. NE (NPU-E)	0.12 acres (0.05 ha)	Greenspot; Midtown
Prado-South Prado Circle	The Prado / South Prado NE (NPU-E)	0.03 acres (0.01 ha)	Greenspot; Midtown
Prado-Westminster Triangle	The Prado / Westminister Dr. NE (NPU-E)	0.07 acres (0.03 ha)	Greenspot; Midtown
Prairie View Beauty Spot	Willis Mill Rd. (NPU-I)	0.03 acres (0.01 ha)	Greenspot; Southwest Atlanta
Pryor-Tucker Playlot	Pryor Rd. / Tucker St. SE (NPU-Z)	0.19 acres (0.08 ha)	Playlot; Southeast Atlanta
Queen and White Beauty Spot	Queen St. / White St. SW (NPU-T)	0.04 acres (0.02 ha)	Playlot; Southwest Atlanta
Ralph David Abernathy Median	R.D. Abernathy (NPU-V)	0.29 acres (0.12 ha)	Playlot; Southeast Atlanta
Ralph David Abernathy Plaza	R.D. Abernathy / Formwalt St. (NPU-V)	0.33 acres (0.13 ha)	Plaza; Southeast Atlanta
Ranier Circle	Ranier Dr. NW (NPU-A)	0.01 acres (0.00 ha)	Greenspot; North Atlanta
Ray Kluka Memorial Park	Greenwood Ave. / Monroe Dr. NE (NPU-E)	0.05 acres (0.02 ha)	Greenspot; Midtown
Rebel Valley Playlot	1005 Stonewall Drive SE (NPU-Z)	1.37 acres (0.55 ha)	Playlot; Southeast Atlanta
Robin Lane Park	Robin Lane NE (NPU-F)	0.02 acres (0.01 ha)	Greenspot; Northeast Atlanta
Rose Circle Triangle	Rose Circle / Lee Street SW (NPU-T)	0.21 acres (0.08 ha)	Greenspot; Southwest Atlanta
Rumson and Pinetree Park	Rumson Rd. NE / Pinetree Dr. (NPU-B)	0.01 acres (0.00 ha)	Greenspot; North Atlanta
Rumson Road Circle	Rumson Rd. / Rumson Way NE (NPU-B)	0.03 acres (0.01 ha)	Greenspot; North Atlanta
Sandpiper Circle	2853 Sandpiper Circle SW (NPU-I)	0.06 acres (0.02 ha)	Greenspot; Southwest Atlanta
Sandtown Triangle	Cascade Rd. / Sandtown Ave. SW (NPU-R)	0.14 acres (0.06 ha)	Greenspot; Southwest Atlanta
Sara J. González Park	2411 Coronet Way NW (NPU-C)	1.41 acres (0.57 ha)	Playlot; North Atlanta
Shirley Place Park	60 Pansy Street NW (NPU-J)	2.42 acres (0.98 ha)	Park in Holding; Northwest Atlanta
Spellman-Morehouse Beauty Spot	Spellman St. NW / Morehouse Dr. (NPU-J)	0.03 acres (0.01 ha)	Greenspot; Northwest Atlanta
Spink-Collins Park	2001 Collins Dr. NW (NPU-D)	21.49 acres (8.70 ha)	Playlot; North Atlanta
Spring Valley Jewish Corner	Spring Valley Ln. / University Dr. NE (NPU-F)	0.07 acres (0.03 ha)	Greenspot; Northeast Atlanta
Stafford Circle Park	14 Stafford St. NW (NPU-K)	0.04 acres (0.02 ha)	Greenspot; Northwest Atlanta
Stafford Street Park	Stafford St. SW / Jasper St. SW (NPU-K)	0.12 acres (0.05 ha)	Greenspot; Northwest Atlanta
Stoney Point Park	Confederate Ave. / Woodland Ave. SE (NPU-W)	0.19 acres (0.08 ha)	Greenspot; East Atlanta
Sunken Garden Park	1000 E. Rock Springs Rd. NE (NPU-F)	0.92 acres (0.37 ha)	Greenspot; Northeast Atlanta
Tanyard Creek Adjacent	Adjacent to Ardmore Park (NPU-E)	6.29 acres (2.55 ha)	Nature preserve; Midtown area
Tennyson Circle	Tennyson Circle (NPU-C)	0.03 acres (0.01 ha)	Greenspot; North Atlanta
Todd Street Triangle	Todd Rd. NE / Adair Ave. NE (NPU-F)	0.02 acres (0.01 ha)	Greenspot; Northeast Atlanta
Torrence Circle	160 Torrence St. NW (NPU-J)	0.05 acres (0.02 ha)	Greenspot; Northwest Atlanta
Tremont Playlot	Tremont Dr. NW / Dixie Hills Cir. NW (NPU-J)	0.18 acres (0.07 ha)	Playlot; Northwest Atlanta
Tucson Trail Park	4610 Tucson Trail SW / Santa Rosa Dr. SW (NPU-P)	2.77 acres (1.12 ha)	Playlot; Southwest Atlanta
Valley Road and Habersham Park	Valley Rd. NW / Habersham Rd. NW (NPU-A)	0.04 acres (0.02 ha)	Greenspot; North Atlanta
Vedado-Greenwood Triangle	Vedado Way NE / Greenwood Ave. NE (NPU-E)	0.07 acres (0.03 ha)	Greenspot; Midtown
Veltre Circle	2718 Veltre Place SW (NPU-I)	0.18 acres (0.07 ha)	Greenspot; Southwest Atlanta
Verbena Street Playlot	120 Hyacinth Ave. NW / 2185 Verbena St. NW (NPU-J)	0.69 acres (0.28 ha)	Playlot; Northwest Atlanta
Virginia Highland Triangle	Virginia Ave. NE / N. Highland Ave. NE (NPU-F)	0.05 acres (0.02 ha)	Greenspot; Northeast Atlanta
Walton Spring Park	Spring St. / Int'l Blvd. / Carnegie Way NW (NPU-M)	0.18 acres (0.07 ha)	Plaza; Downtown area
Warren Road Park	2465 Warren Rd (NPU-C)	8.65 acres (3.50 ha)	Park in Holding; North Atlanta
Watkins Park	Watkins Street NW (NPU-G)	0.8 acres (0.32 ha)	Playlot; North Atlanta
Welch Street Park	794 Welch St. SE (NPU-V)	0.18 acres (0.07 ha)	Greenspot; Southeast Atlanta
Wildwood Place	Wildwood Place NE (NPU-F)	0.05 acres (0.02 ha)	Greenspot; Northeast Atlanta
Willard and Gordon Park	Willard Ave. / S. Gordon St. SW (NPU-T)	0.07 acres (0.03 ha)	Greenspot; Southwest Atlanta
Wilson Park Triangle	E. Morningside Dr. NE / N. Rock Springs Rd. NE (NPU-F)	0.12 acres (0.05 ha)	Playlot; Northeast Atlanta
Windsor Street Park	700 Windsor St. SE / Bass St. SE (NPU-V)	1.09 acres (0.44 ha)	Playlot; Southeast Atlanta
Zimmer Drive Circle	Zimmer Dr. NE (NPU-F)	0.04 acres (0.02 ha)	Greenspot; Northeast Atlanta

== Special Facilities ==
Park Name	Location / Address	Acreage	Notes / Facilities
Avery Park (Gilbert House)	2238 Perkerson Rd SE (NPU-X)	11.03 acres (4.46 ha)	Special facility; Historic building
Bass Recreation Center	326 Moreland Ave. NE (NPU-N)	1 acre (0.40 ha)	Special facility; Recreation center
J. Allen Couch Park	Hemphill Ave. / Ferst St. / 6th St. (NPU-E)	6.41 acres (2.59 ha)	Special facility; East Atlanta recreation area
John C. Burdine Center	215 Lakewood Way SW (NPU-Z)	4.27 acres (1.73 ha)	Special facility; Recreation center
Campbellton Road Park	2853 Campbellton Rd. SW (NPU-R)	7,000 acres (2,833 ha)	Conservation/Forested acres; Large conservation area southwest Atlanta
Georgia Hill Center	250 Georgia Avenue SE (NPU-area)	1 acre (0.40 ha)	Community center; Southeast Atlanta

== Parks in Holding and Conservation Areas ==
Park Name	Location / Address	Acreage	Notes / Facilities
2310 Bolton Rd	2310 Bolton Rd (NPU-D)	1.07 acres (0.43 ha)	Park in holding; Development pending
Avery Park (Gilbert House)	2238 Perkerson Rd SE (NPU-X)	11.03 acres (4.46 ha)	Special facility classification; Historic site
Campbellton Road Park	2853 Campbellton Rd. SW (NPU-R)	7,000 acres (2,833 ha)	Forested acres conservation area
Chattahoochee Brick	3195 Brick Plant Road (NPU-E)	75.47 acres (30.54 ha)	Park in holding; Future greenspace development
Cumberlander Ivan Hill	Lynhurst Dr. SW (NPU-I)	8.67 acres (3.51 ha)	Park in holding; Southwest Atlanta
Defoors Ferry Park	2400 Defoors Ferry Rd (NPU-D)	6 acres (2.43 ha)	Park in holding; North Atlanta
Emma Lane	Emma Lane NE (NPU-B)	8.8 acres (3.56 ha)	Park in holding; Northeast Atlanta
Forest Park Road Park	3724 Forest Park Road SE (NPU-Z)	3.76 acres (1.52 ha)	Park in holding; Southeast Atlanta
Georgian Terrace Park	2170 Old Georgian Terrace (NPU-D)	2.64 acres (1.07 ha)	Park in holding; North Atlanta
Greenbriar	2841 Greenbriar Pkwy. SW (NPU-R)	7.05 acres (2.85 ha)	Park in holding; Southwest Atlanta
Holly Street Park	1237 Holly Street (NPU-E)	0 acres (0.00 ha)	Playlot/Park in-holding; Midtown
Hutchens Road Park	640 Hutchens Road (NPU-Z)	0.99 acres (0.40 ha)	Playlot/Park in-holding; Southeast Atlanta
Falling Water (Kings Ridge)	Panther Trail at Mount Gilead Rd. SW (NPU-R)	25.84 acres (10.46 ha)	Park in holding; Large southwest Atlanta area
Lake Charlotte Nature Preserve	Forest Park Rd SE (NPU-Z)	0 acres (0.00 ha)	Nature preserve/park in-holding; Southeast Atlanta
Loridans Park	700 Loridans Dr NE (NPU-B)	1.11 acres (0.45 ha)	Park in holding; Northeast Atlanta
Lower Paul Park	2388 Paul Ave NW (NPU-D)	17 acres (6.88 ha)	Park in holding; North Atlanta
Ormewood Forest	770 Shadowridge Dr SE (NPU-W)	3.188 acres (1.29 ha)	Park in holding; East Atlanta
Shirley Place Park	60 Pansy Street NW (NPU-J)	2.42 acres (0.98 ha)	Park in holding; Northwest Atlanta
Warren Road Park	2465 Warren Rd (NPU-C)	8.65 acres (3.50 ha)	Park in holding; North Atlanta

== See Also ==
- Atlanta Beltline – Multi-use trail and park system
- Piedmont Park – Historic regional park in Midtown
- Grant Park – Historic regional park with Zoo Atlanta
- Freedom Park – Linear regional park
- Oakland Cemetery – Historic cemetery and green space
- Neighborhood Planning Unit – NPU designation system
- Trees Atlanta – Urban forestry nonprofit
- Carter Center – Located within Freedom Park
