= WDMH =

WMDH may refer to:

- Winchester District Memorial Hospital
- Warith Deen Mohammed High School, a school within the system of Mohammed Schools (Georgia)
