= The Imperial OPA =

Circus operated from Atlanta, Georgia, US

The Imperial OPA Circus

Origin
- Circus name: The Imperial OPA
- Country: United States
- Founder(s): Timothy Mack
- Year founded: 2009

Information
- Fate: Defunct
- Ringmaster(s): Timothy Mack
- Traveling show?: Yes
- Circus tent?: No Tent
- Type of acts: 12 +

The Imperial OPA Circus was a modern circus headquartered and operated out of Atlanta, Georgia.

Founded in 2009 by Timothy Mack, the Imperial OPA Circus performed at local events to benefit nonprofit organizations such as Wish for Wendy, which benefits those with cystic fibrosis, and the Atlanta Hunger Walk, which benefits the Atlanta Community Food Bank.

Their first performance was an Atlanta local fundraiser to supply the East Atlanta Village with recycling cans. Their second performance, entitled "Cirque du Beaute", was on October 3, 2009 with Jyl Craven, a local hair studio. This was a fundraiser for the St. Jude's Children's Hospital of Atlanta.
