= Coco Gauff =

American tennis player (born 2004)

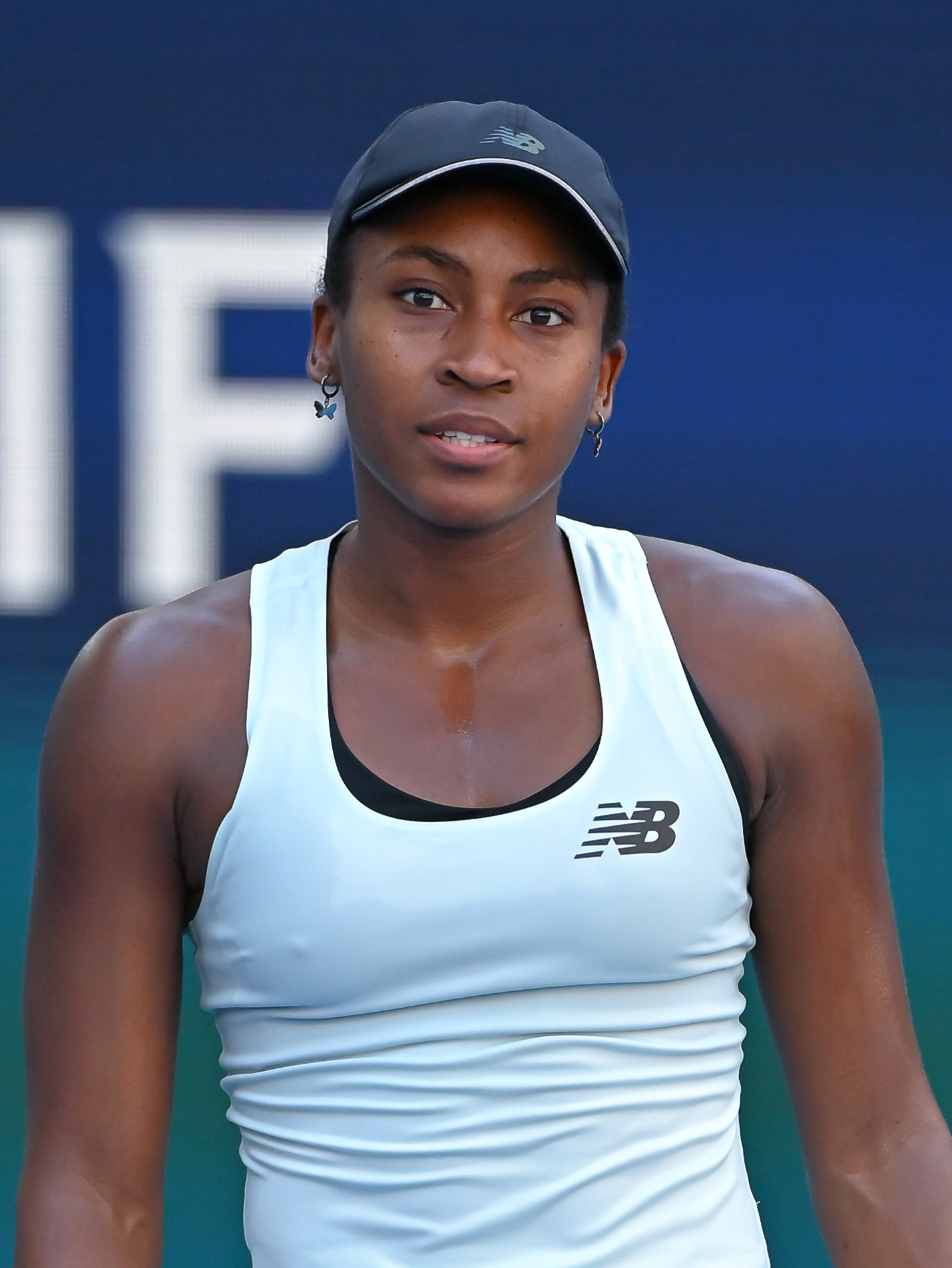
- Gauff at the 2026 Miami Open
- Full name: Cori Dionne Gauff
- Country (sports): United States
- Residence: Boca Raton, Florida, US
- Born: March 13, 2004 (age 22) Boca Raton, Florida, US
- Height: 5 ft 9 in (175 cm)
- Turned pro: 2018
- Plays: Right-handed (two-handed backhand)
- Coach: Jean-Christophe Faurel (2019–present); Gavin MacMillan (2025–present)
- Prize money: US$37,516,617: 9th all-time in earnings

Singles
- Career record: 326–131
- Career titles: 12
- Highest ranking: No. 2 (10 June 2024)
- Current ranking: No. 4 (16 Novemner 2026)

Grand Slam singles results
- Australian Open: SF (2024)
- French Open: W (2025)
- Wimbledon: SF (2026)
- US Open: W (2023)

Other tournaments
- Tour Finals: W (2024)
- Olympic Games: 3R (2024)

Doubles
- Career record: 154–69
- Career titles: 10
- Highest ranking: No. 1 (15 August 2022)
- Current ranking: No. 151 (16 November 2026)

Grand Slam doubles results
- Australian Open: SF (2023)
- French Open: W (2024)
- Wimbledon: QF (2024)
- US Open: F (2021)

Other doubles tournaments
- Tour Finals: RR (2022, 2023)
- Olympic Games: 2R (2024)

Grand Slam mixed doubles results
- Wimbledon: SF (2022)
- US Open: 2R (2018)

Other mixed doubles tournaments
- Olympic Games: QF (2024)
- Last updated on: 19 November 2026.

Cori Dionne "Coco" Gauff (/ˈɡɔːf/ GAWF; born March 13, 2004) is an American professional tennis player. She has a career-high ranking of world No. 2 in singles and of world No. 1 in doubles by the WTA. Gauff has won twelve career singles titles, including two majors at the 2023 US Open and 2025 French Open, as well as the 2024 WTA Finals and four WTA 1000 events. She has also won ten doubles titles, including the 2024 French Open, partnering with Kateřina Siniaková.

A teen sensation, Gauff made her WTA Tour debut in 2019 at age 15. At that year's Wimbledon Championships, she became the youngest player in the tournament's history to qualify for the main draw, where she defeated Venus Williams and reached the fourth round. Gauff won her first WTA Tour singles title at the 2019 Linz Open. She reached her first major singles final at the 2022 French Open. In 2023, Gauff won her first major singles title at the US Open, followed by the WTA Finals title the following year. In 2025, she won a second major singles title at the French Open.

In doubles, Gauff has reached three major finals, finishing runner-up with Caty McNally at the 2021 US Open and Jessica Pegula at the 2022 French Open and prevailing with Siniaková at the 2024 French Open. She reached the No. 1 ranking in 2022 in partnership with Pegula.

== Early life ==
Gauff was born at West Boca Medical Center in Boca Raton, Florida, on March 13, 2004, to Candi (née Odom) and Corey Gauff, both from Delray Beach. She has two younger brothers. Her father played college basketball at Georgia State University and later worked as a health care executive. Her mother was a track-and-field athlete at Florida State University and worked as an educator. Gauff lived her early years in Atlanta. She began playing tennis at age six. When she was seven, her family moved back to Delray Beach to have better training opportunities. She worked with Gerard Loglo at the New Generation Tennis Academy starting from the age of eight.

Gauff recalled, "I wasn't much of a team person. I loved tennis. I was so-so about it in the beginning because when I was younger I didn't want to practice at all. I just wanted to play with my friends. When I turned eight, that was when I played 'Little Mo' [tournament] and after that I decided to do that for the rest of my life."

Gauff's parents gave up their careers to focus on training their daughter. Her father later became her primary coach, while her mother oversaw her homeschooling. Her father had limited experience playing tennis growing up. At the age of 10, Gauff began to train at the Mouratoglou Tennis Academy in France run by Patrick Mouratoglou, longtime coach of Serena Williams. Mouratoglou commented, "I'll always remember the first time I saw Coco. She came over to the Mouratoglou Academy in 2014 to try out and she impressed me with her determination, athleticism and fighting spirit.... When she looks at you and tells you she will be number one, you can only believe it." He helped sponsor Gauff through his Champ'Seed foundation, which he created to provide funding for talented juniors who did not have the financial resources to afford high-level training.

Gauff won the USTA Clay Court National 12-and-under title at the age of 10 years and three months to become the youngest champion in the tournament's history.

== Juniors ==
=== French Open singles and US Open doubles champion ===
Gauff is a former world No. 1 junior. She entered the prestigious Les Petits As 14-and-under tournament in 2016 at age 12 and made it to the semifinals. Gauff began playing on the ITF Junior Circuit at the age of 13, skipping directly to the highest-level Grade A and Grade 1 tournaments. She finished runner-up to Jaimee Fourlis in her third career event, the Grade 1 Prince George's County Junior Tennis Championships in Maryland. At her next event, Gauff made her junior Grand Slam tournament debut at the 2017 US Open and finished runner-up to Amanda Anisimova. Gauff did not drop a set before the final in either tournament. She became the youngest girls' singles finalist in US Open history at 13 years, 181 days old.

After beginning 2018 with a semifinal at the Grade 1 Traralgon Junior International in Australia, Gauff lost her opening round match at the Australian Open. She did not enter another tournament in singles until the French, where she won her first career junior Grand Slam tournament title at the 2018 French Open. She did not drop a set until the final, where she came from behind to defeat Caty McNally in three sets. With the title, Gauff became the fifth youngest girls' singles champion in French Open history at 14 years, 89 days old. A month later, following another final win against McNally at the Grade 1 Junior International Roehampton, she became the No. 1 junior in the world.

Gauff reached the quarterfinals in singles at the final two majors of the year. She fared better in doubles at both tournaments, reaching the semifinals at Wimbledon with partner María Lourdes Carlé and winning her first junior Grand Slam tournament doubles title at the 2018 US Open with McNally. Gauff and McNally defeated compatriots Hailey Baptiste and Dalayna Hewitt in the final, in straight sets. In September 2018, Gauff represented the United States at the Junior Fed Cup with Alexa Noel and Connie Ma. The team reached the final against Ukraine. After Gauff won her singles rubber and Noel lost hers, Gauff and Noel won the Junior Fed Cup by defeating Lyubov Kostenko and Dasha Lopatetskaya 11–9 in a match tiebreak. Gauff finished the year with another Grade A title in singles at the Orange Bowl. She ended the season ranked world No. 2 behind Clara Burel.

== Professional ==
=== 2018–19: Wimbledon fourth round, WTA 250 title ===
In May 2018, at the age of 14, Gauff made her debut on the ITF Women's Circuit in the 25k event at Osprey as a qualifier. She won her first professional match. Gauff received a wildcard into qualifying at the US Open, but lost her opening match.

In her first 2019 tournament, Gauff finished runner-up in doubles at the 100k Midland Tennis Classic alongside Ann Li. Two weeks later, Gauff played her next event at the $25k level in Surprise. She finished runner-up in singles and won her first WTA Tour title in doubles alongside Paige Hourigan. Gauff received a wildcard into the Miami Open. In her WTA Tour main draw debut, she came from a set down to defeat wildcard entrant Caty McNally. She lost in the second round to No. 22 Daria Kasatkina. Gauff received a wildcard into qualifying at the French Open, but lost in the second round.

Ranked No. 313, Gauff received a wildcard into qualifying at Wimbledon. She won all three qualifying matches. At the age of 15 years and three months, she became the youngest player to reach the main draw at Wimbledon by qualifying in the Open Era. In her Grand Slam main-draw debut, Gauff upset five-time Wimbledon champion Venus Williams in straight sets. She became the youngest player to win a match at Wimbledon since Jennifer Capriati in 1991. In the second round, she defeated Magdaléna Rybáriková. In the third round, she defeated Polona Hercog, saving two match points in the second set. The hype surrounding her first-round match win led to her third-rounder being moved to Centre Court. In the fourth round, she was eliminated by No. 7 and eventual champion Simona Halep. All four of Gauff's matches were most-watched matches on ESPN on their respective days during the first week of coverage. Her ranking rose to No. 141.

Entering the Washington Open after qualifying, Gauff lost in the first round to Zarina Diyas. In doubles, however, she and Caty McNally won their first career WTA doubles title, defeating Maria Sanchez and Fanny Stollár in the final. Gauff received wildcards into singles and doubles main draw at the US Open. She defeated qualifier Anastasia Potapova and Tímea Babos, both in three sets on Louis Armstrong, but lost in the third round to world No. 1 and defending champion Naomi Osaka. Osaka graciously allowed Gauff an on-court interview after the match, usually only afforded to the winner. In doubles, Gauff and McNally won two matches, including an upset over ninth seeds Nicole Melichar and Květa Peschke. They lost in the third round to eventual runners-up Victoria Azarenka and Ashleigh Barty.

Although Gauff lost in qualifying at the Linz Open, she entered the main draw as a lucky loser. She upset No. 8 Kiki Bertens in the quarterfinals in straight sets for her first top-10 victory. She defeated Jeļena Ostapenko in the final in three sets. At 15 years and seven months old, Gauff became the youngest WTA player to win a singles title since Nicole Vaidišová in 2004. With this title, she made her top-75 debut in WTA singles rankings. With a semifinal appearance in doubles with McNally, she also made her top-100 debut in WTA doubles rankings. Gauff and McNally ended their year with a second WTA doubles title at the Luxembourg Open over Kaitlyn Christian and Alexa Guarachi.

=== 2020: Australian Open fourth round, top 50 ===
Gauff started 2020 in Auckland. She defeated Viktória Kužmová before losing to Laura Siegemund. At the Australian Open, Gauff beat Venus Williams again in the first round in straight sets. In the second round, she defeated Sorana Cîrstea. In the third round, she upset No. 4 and defending champion Naomi Osaka in straight sets. She became the youngest player to reach the last 16 of two major tournaments since Martina Hingis in 1996. She lost in the last 16 to No. 15 and eventual champion Sofia Kenin in three sets. Following the tournament, Gauff broke into top 50, becoming the youngest woman to be ranked in the top 50 since Sesil Karatancheva in 2005. In doubles, Gauff and McNally recorded their best result in a major championship to date, reaching the quarterfinals before falling to second seeds and eventual champions, Tímea Babos and Kristina Mladenovic.

After the COVID-19 pandemic shut down the WTA Tour, Gauff entered the Top Seed Open in August. She upset No. 11 Aryna Sabalenka in the second round in three sets. She lost in the semifinals to eventual champion Jennifer Brady in straight sets. At the Cincinnati Open, she lost in the first round to No. 21 Maria Sakkari. At the US Open, she was defeated in the first round by Anastasija Sevastova.

At the Italian Open, Gauff beat Ons Jabeur before losing to No. 17 Garbiñe Muguruza. At the French Open, she defeated No. 13 Johanna Konta before losing to qualifier Martina Trevisan.

Gauff entered the Ostrava Open after qualifying. She defeated wildcard entrant Kateřina Siniaková before losing to No. 12 Aryna Sabalenka in three sets.

=== 2021: French Open quarterfinal, top 20 ===
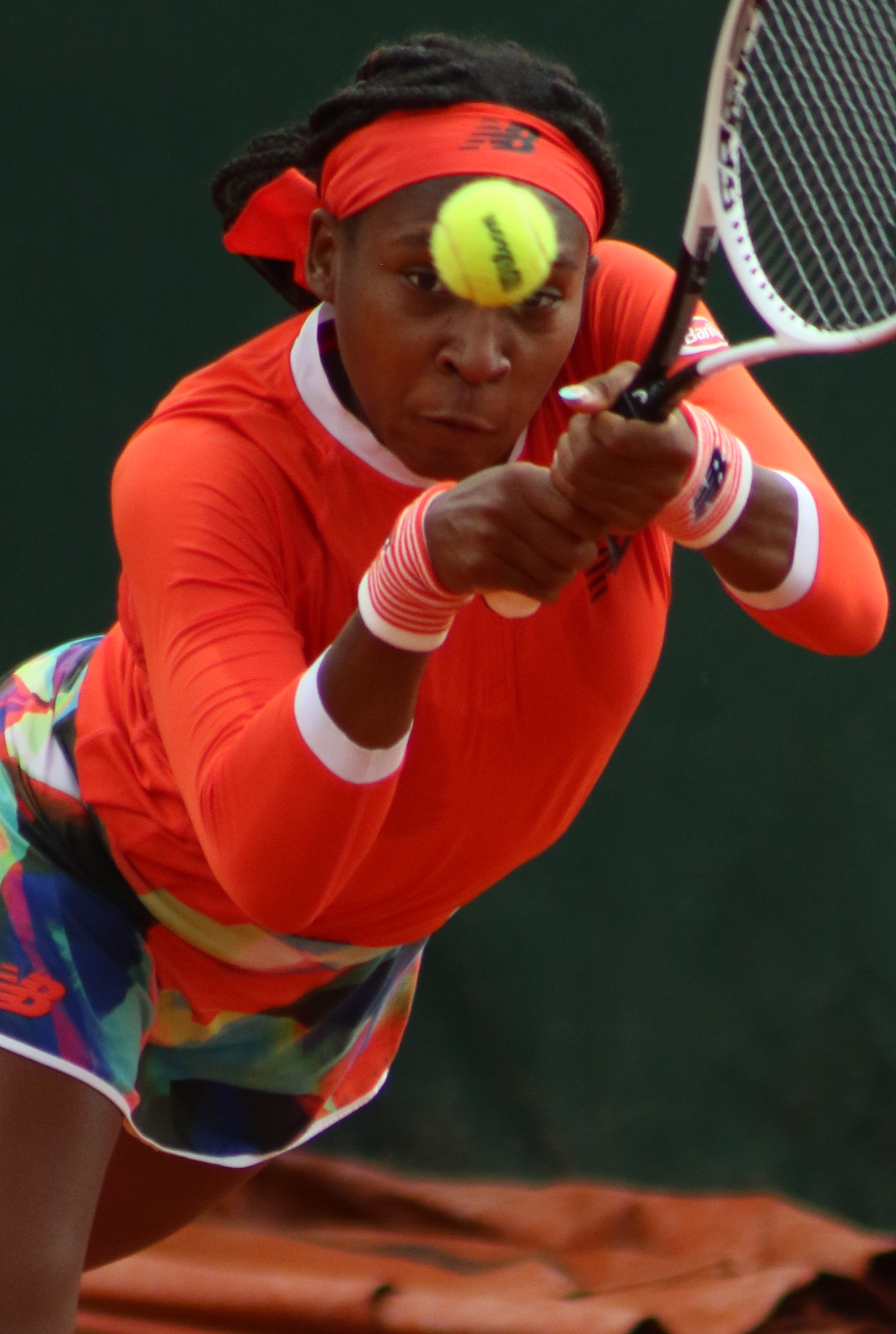
Gauff at the 2021 French Open

Gauff started the year at the Abu Dhabi Open. She beat Ulrikke Eikeri before falling to No. 22 Maria Sakkari. At the Gippsland Trophy, she beat Jil Teichmann before losing to Katie Boulter. At the Australian Open, she beat Jil Teichmann again before falling to No. 5 Elina Svitolina. In doubles, Gauff and McNally reached the quarterfinals, where they fell to Nicole Melichar and Demi Schuurs. Entering the Adelaide International after qualifying, Gauff reached the semifinals following three-set wins over qualifier Jasmine Paolini, No. 21 Petra Martić, and Shelby Rogers. She became the youngest player to reach the semifinals of a WTA 500 level tournament or higher since Nicole Vaidišová in 2006. She lost in the semifinals to No. 12 Belinda Bencic in three sets. As a result, Gauff moved to a career-high ranking of No. 38.

At the Dubai Championships, Gauff defeated Ekaterina Alexandrova, No. 20 Markéta Vondroušová, and qualifier Tereza Martincova to reach her first WTA 1000 quarterfinal. She lost in the quarterfinals to Jil Teichmann in straight sets.

At the Charleston Open, Gauff defeated Tsvetana Pironkova, Liudmila Samsonova, and Lauren Davis to reach her first quarterfinal on clay. She lost in the quarterfinals to No. 12 Ons Jabeur in straight sets.

At the Italian Open, Gauff defeated Yulia Putintseva, No. 19 Maria Sakkari, and No. 4 Aryna Sabalenka to reach the quarterfinals. She reached her first career WTA 1000 semifinal after world No.1 Ashleigh Barty retired. She lost in the semifinals to No. 15 and eventual champion Iga Świątek in straight sets. As a result, Gauff rose to top 30 for the first time.

At the Emilia-Romagna Open in Parma, Gauff defeated Kaia Kanepi, Camila Giorgi, Amanda Anisimova and Kateřina Siniaková to reach her second career final and first on clay. She defeated Wang Qiang in straight sets to win her second singles title. Partnering with McNally, Gauff also won the doubles title, defeating Darija Jurak and Andreja Klepac in the final. She became the youngest player to win both the singles and doubles titles at an event since Maria Sharapova in 2004.

At the French Open, Gauff beat qualifier Aleksandra Krunić and Wang Qiang to reach the third round. She reached the fourth round after No. 14 Jennifer Brady retired while trailing by a set. She beat No. 25 Ons Jabeur in straight sets to reach her first major quarterfinal, becoming the youngest player to reach a major quarterfinal since Nicole Vaidišová in 2006. She lost in the quarterfinals to eventual champion Barbora Krejčíková in straight sets.

At the Wimbledon Championships, Gauff defeated wildcard entrant Francesca Jones, Elena Vesnina, and Kaja Juvan to reach the fourth round, where she lost to No. 28 Angelique Kerber in straight sets.

Gauff qualified for United States tennis team for the 2020 Summer Olympics, but was forced to withdraw after testing positive for COVID-19.

At the Canadian Open, Gauff defeated Anastasija Sevastova in the first round. She reached the third round after qualifier Anastasia Potapova retired, and reached the quarterfinals after Johanna Konta withdrew. She lost in the quarterfinals to eventual champion Camila Giorgi in straight sets. At the Cincinnati Open, she defeated qualifier Hsieh Su-wei before losing to world No. 2 Naomi Osaka. At the US Open, she beat Magda Linette before falling to Sloane Stephens. Despite the loss, Gauff broke into the top 20 after the US Open. In doubles, Gauff and McNally reached their first major final, losing to Sam Stosur and Zhang Shuai.

=== 2022: French Open final, singles top 5, doubles No. 1 ===
Gauff started the season at the Adelaide International 1. She defeated qualifier Ulrikke Eikeri before losing to world No. 1 and eventual champion Ashleigh Barty. At the Adelaide International 2, Gauff defeated Kateřina Siniaková, Marta Kostyuk, and Ana Konjuh to reach the semifinals, where she lost to eventual champion Madison Keys in three sets. At the Australian Open, she lost in the first round against Wang Qiang.

At the Qatar Open, Gauff defeated Shelby Rogers, wildcard entrant Caroline Garcia and No. 4 Paula Badosa to reach the quarterfinals. She lost in the quarterfinals to No. 6 Maria Sakkari in straight sets. In doubles, Gauff paired with Jessica Pegula to win her first WTA 1000 doubles title, beating third-seeded pair of Veronika Kudermetova and Elise Mertens in the final. With the win, Gauff climbed to a career-high No. 10 in the doubles rankings.

At the Indian Wells, Gauff defeated wildcard entrant Claire Liu before losing to No. 26 Simona Halep. In Miami, she defeated qualifier Wang Qiang and Zhang Shuai before losing to world No. 2 and eventual champion Iga Świątek in straight sets.

At the Stuttgart Open, Gauff was knocked out in the first round by Daria Kasatkina. In doubles, however, Gauff reached the final with Zhang Shuai, where they lost to Desirae Krawczyk and Demi Schuurs.

At the French Open, Gauff defeated qualifier Rebecca Marino, Alison Van Uytvanck, Kaia Kanepi, and Elise Mertens to reach the French Open quarterfinals for a second consecutive year, without dropping a set. She defeated Sloane Stephens in straight sets to reach her first major semifinal. She defeated Martina Trevisan in straight sets to reach her first major final, becoming the youngest player to reach the French Open final since Kim Clijsters in 2001. In the final, she lost again to world No. 1 Iga Świątek in straight sets. Partnering with Pegula, Gauff also reached the final in doubles, where they were defeated by Caroline Garcia and Kristina Mladenovic. As a result, Gauff reached a new career-high doubles ranking of top 5.

At the Berlin Open, Gauff defeated Ann Li, qualifier Wang Xinyu, and No. 7 Karolína Plíšková to reach the semifinals, without dropping a set. She lost in the semifinals to No. 4 and eventual champion Ons Jabeur in straight sets. At Wimbledon, she defeated Elena-Gabriela Ruse and Mihaela Buzărnescu before losing to No. 25 Amanda Anisimova in three sets.

At the Silicon Valley Classic, Gauff defeated Anhelina Kalinina and Naomi Osaka to reach the quarterfinals, where she lost to No. 4 Paula Badosa in straight sets.

At the Canadian Open, Gauff defeated qualifier Madison Brengle in the first round. She then beat Elena Rybakina and No. 6 Aryna Sabalenka, winning both matches in a third-set tiebreak. In the quarterfinals, she lost to No. 7 and eventual champion Simona Halep in straight sets. In doubles, Gauff won her second WTA 1000 doubles title together with Pegula, defeating Nicole Melichar and Ellen Perez in the final. As a result, Gauff became the No. 1 doubles player in the world. She was the second-youngest player in history to earn the doubles No.1 ranking after Martina Hingis in 1998.

At the US Open, Gauff defeated qualifier Leolia Jeanjean, Elena-Gabriela Ruse, No. 20 Madison Keys and Zhang Shuai, without dropping a set, to advance to her first US Open quarterfinal. She became the youngest American woman to reach the US Open quarterfinals since Melanie Oudin in 2009. She lost in the quarterfinals to No. 17 Caroline Garcia in straight sets. As a result, Gauff made her top 10 debut in the singles rankings, at world No. 8.

At the San Diego Open, Gauff defeated qualifier Robin Montgomery and Bianca Andreescu to reach the quarterfinals. In the quarterfinals, she lost again to world No. 1 and eventual champion Iga Świątek in straight sets. She won the doubles event with Pegula, defeating Gabriela Dabrowski and Giuliana Olmos in the final. At the Guadalajara Open, Gauff defeated qualifier Elisabetta Cocciaretto and No. 28 Martina Trevisan to reach the quarterfinals, where she lost to Victoria Azarenka in three sets. Nevertheless, her ranking climbed to No. 4.

Gauff qualified for the WTA Finals for the first time, becoming the youngest player to compete at the WTA Finals since Maria Sharapova in 2005. She and Pegula also qualified in doubles, becoming the first Americans to compete at the WTA Finals in singles and doubles since Serena and Venus Williams in 2009. Gauff lost all her three matches against Caroline Garcia, Daria Kasatkina, and Iga Świątek in the round-robin stage, in straight sets.

=== 2023: US Open champion, No. 3 ===
Gauff started her 2023 season in Auckland. She defeated Tatjana Maria, wildcard entrant Sofia Kenin, Zhu Lin, Danka Kovinić, and qualifier Rebeka Masarova to win third WTA Tour title, without dropping a set en route. At the Australian Open, she defeated Kateřina Siniaková, Emma Raducanu, and Bernarda Pera to advance to the fourth round, where she lost to No. 17 Jeļena Ostapenko in straight sets.

At the Qatar Open, Gauff defeated No. 13 Petra Kvitová to reach the quarterfinals, where she lost to No. 11 Veronika Kudermetova in three sets. At the same tournament in doubles, Gauff and Pegula defended their title, defeating Lyudmyla Kichenok and Jeļena Ostapenko in the final. At the Dubai Championships, Gauff defeated Aliaksandra Sasnovich to reach the third round. She reached the quarterfinals when No. 10 Elena Rybakina withdrew. She defeated Madison Keys to reach the semifinals, where she lost to world No. 1 Iga Świątek in straight sets.

At the Indian Wells, Gauff defeated qualifier Cristina Bucșa, Linda Nosková, and qualifier Rebecca Peterson to reach the quarterfinals, where she lost to world No. 2 Aryna Sabalenka in straight sets. In Miami, she defeated Rebecca Marino before losing to No. 26 Anastasia Potapova. However, she won her third WTA 1000 doubles title with Pegula, defeating Leylah Fernandez and Taylor Townsend in the final.

In Madrid, Gauff defeated qualifier Irene Burillo before losing to Paula Badosa. At the same tournament in doubles, she and Pegula reached the final, losing to Victoria Azarenka and Beatriz Haddad Maia. In Rome, Gauff defeated Yulia Putintseva before losing to Marie Bouzková. At the same tournament in doubles, she and Pegula again reached the final, losing to Storm Hunter and Elise Mertens.

At the French Open, Gauff defeated Rebeka Masarova, Julia Grabher, qualifier Mirra Andreeva, and Anna Karolina Schmiedlova to reach her third straight French Open quarterfinal. In the quarterfinals, she lost again to world No. 1 Iga Świątek in straight sets.

At the Eastbourne International, Gauff defeated Bernarda Pera, lucky loser Jodie Burrage, and No. 3 Jessica Pegula, without dropping a set, to reach the semifinals but lost to eventual champion Madison Keys in straight sets. At Wimbledon, she lost in the first round to qualifier Sofia Kenin.

At the Washington Open, Gauff defeated qualifier Hailey Baptiste, No. 15 Belinda Bencic, No. 18 Liudmila Samsonova, and No. 9 Maria Sakkari to win her first WTA 500 title, without dropping a set en route. She became the youngest female champion of the tournament.

At the Cincinnati Open, Gauff defeated Mayar Sherif and qualifiers Linda Nosková and Jasmine Paolini, without dropping a set, to reach the semifinals. She stunned world No. 1 Iga Świątek for the first time after losing their previous seven meetings to reach her first WTA 1000 final. She defeated Karolína Muchová in straight sets to win her first WTA 1000 title.

At the US Open, Gauff came from a set down to defeat qualifier Laura Siegemund in the first round. In the second round, she defeated Mirra Andreeva. In the third round, she came from a set down to defeat Elise Mertens. She defeated wildcard entrant Caroline Wozniacki in three sets to reach her second straight US Open quarterfinal. She defeated No. 21 Jeļena Ostapenko in straight sets to reach her first US Open semifinal. She defeated No. 10 Karolína Muchová in straight sets to reach her second major final and her first at US Open. She came from a set down to defeat world No. 2 Aryna Sabalenka and win her first major title. She became the youngest American player to reach and win the US Open final since Serena Williams in 1999. As a result, she reached a new career-high ranking of No. 3. Following Barbora Krejčíková and Kateřina Siniaková's second-round exit, Gauff and Pegula also jointly rose to No.1 in the doubles rankings.

At the China Open, Gauff defeated Ekaterina Alexandrova, Petra Martić, No. 16 Veronika Kudermetova, and No. 6 Maria Sakkari to reach the semifinals, where she lost to world No. 2 and eventual champion Iga Świątek in straight sets.

Gauff qualified for the WTA Finals for the second year in a row. She and Pegula also qualified in doubles for the second year in a row. Gauff defeated Ons Jabeur and Markéta Vondroušová to advance to the semifinals. She lost her group match against Iga Świątek and lost in the semifinals to Jessica Pegula, in straight sets.

=== 2024: WTA Finals champion, No. 2 ===
Gauff started her clay season at the Stuttgart Open. She defeated qualifier Sachia Vickery to reach the quarterfinals, where she lost to Marta Kostyuk in three sets.

At the Italian Open, Gauff defeated Magdalena Fręch, lucky loser Jaqueline Cristian, and Paula Badosa to reach the quarterfinals. She defeated No. 7 Zheng Qinwen in straight sets to reach the semifinals. In the semifinals, she lost to world No. 1 and eventual champion Iga Świątek in straight sets. At the same tournament in doubles, Gauff partnered Erin Routliffe to reach the final, losing to Sara Errani and Jasmine Paolini.

At the French Open, Gauff defeated qualifiers Julia Avdeeva and Tamara Zidanšek, Dayana Yastremska, and Elisabetta Cocciaretto to reach her fourth straight French Open quarterfinal, without dropping a set en route. She came from a set down to defeat No. 9 Ons Jabeur and reach her second French Open semifinal. In the semifinals, she lost again to world No. 1 Iga Świątek in straight sets. Despite the loss, Gauff reached a new career-high ranking of world No. 2. In doubles, Gauff partnered with Katerina Siniaková to win her first major doubles title, defeating Sara Errani and Jasmine Paolini in the final.

Gauff started her grass season at the Berlin Open. She defeated Ekaterina Alexandrova to reach the quarterfinals, and reached the semifinals as No. 10 Ons Jabeur retired after losing first set. In the semifinals, she lost to No. 5 and eventual champion Jessica Pegula in straight sets. At the Wimbledon Championships, she defeated Caroline Dolehide and qualifiers Anca Todoni and Sonay Kartal to reach the fourth round, where she lost to No. 17 Emma Navarro in straight sets.

Gauff was chosen by her Olympic teammates to be the female flag-bearer for the United States at the opening ceremony of the 2024 Summer Olympics in Paris, alongside LeBron James. She became the youngest athlete to be so honored. In singles, she lost in the third round to No. 21 Donna Vekić. In women's doubles, she and Jessica Pegula lost in the second round to the Czech duo of Karolína Muchová and Linda Nosková.

In October, Gauff won the 2024 China Open title, beating Karolína Muchová in the final. It was Gauff's second WTA 1000 singles title. She became the first player to win each of her seven WTA hardcourt finals in the Open era and the second American to win the championship, following Serena Williams' title runs in 2004 and 2013.

On November 9, Gauff became the 2024 WTA Finals singles champion, becoming the youngest player to win the year-end championships since Maria Sharapova in 2004 and the first American to win the finals since Serena Williams in 2014. She beat Iga Świątek, the No. 2 seed and defending champion of the WTA Finals in Riyadh. She then defeated Sabalenka in the semifinals and Zheng Qinwen in the finals to capture her first year-end singles championship title.

=== 2025: French Open champion ===
To begin the 2025 season, Gauff participated in the United Cup, where the United States team won the title against Poland. In the final, she defeated world No. 2, Iga Świątek, in straight sets. Gauff was undefeated across the tournament.

At the Australian Open, she advanced to the quarterfinals where she was defeated by Paula Badosa, in straight sets. After the Australian Open, Gauff lost both of her opening matches in the Middle East at the Qatar Open and the Dubai Championships, totaling three consecutive losses. She then reached the 4th round at both the Indian Wells Open and the Miami Open.

Gauff started her clay season at the Stuttgart Open. She defeated Ella Seidel to reach the quarterfinals, where she lost to No. 6 Jasmine Paolini in straight sets.

At the Madrid Open, Gauff came back to defeat Dayana Yastremska after losing the first set 6-0 in her opening match. She defeated Ann Li and Belinda Bencic to reach the quarterfinals. In the quarterfinals, she defeated No. 7 Mirra Andreeva in straight sets. In the semifinals, she defeated world No. 2 Iga Świątek in straight sets. In the final, she lost to world No. 1 Aryna Sabalenka in straight sets.

At the Italian Open, Gauff came from a set down to defeat qualifier Victoria Mboko in her opening match. She defeated Magda Linette and Emma Raducanu to reach the quarterfinals. In the quarterfinals, she defeated No. 7 Mirra Andreeva again in straight sets. In the semifinals, she defeated No. 8 Zheng Qinwen in a three-set match lasting over three hours. In the final, she fell again to No. 5 Jasmine Paolini in straight sets. Despite the loss, her ranking rose to world No. 2 again.

At the French Open, Gauff defeated Olivia Gadecki, qualifier Tereza Valentova, Marie Bouzkova, and No. 20 Ekaterina Alexandrova to reach her fifth straight French Open quarterfinal, without dropping a set en route. She came from a set down to defeat No. 8 Madison Keys and reach her third French Open semifinal. She defeated wildcard entrant Loïs Boisson in straight sets to reach her second French Open final. In a rematch of their Madrid final, she came from a set down to defeat world No. 1 Aryna Sabalenka and win her first French Open singles title and second major singles title.

At Wimbledon, Gauff lost in the first round to Dayana Yastremska.

Gauff struggled with her serve during the North American hard court season. At the Canadian Open, she defeated Danielle Collins and Veronika Kudermetova before losing to wildcard entrant and eventual champion Victoria Mboko. At the Cincinnati Open, Gauff defeated Wang Xinyu in her opening match. She moved into the fourth round after Dayana Yastremska withdrew. She defeated Lucia Bronzetti to reach the quarterfinals, where she lost again to No. 9 Jasmine Paolini in three sets. At the US Open, she defeated Ajla Tomljanović, Donna Vekić, and Magdalena Fręch to reach the fourth round, where she lost to No. 24 Naomi Osaka in straight sets.

In October, Gauff won the 2025 Wuhan Open title, beating compatriot Jessica Pegula in the final. It was Gauff's third WTA 1000 singles title. She became the first American to win the title since Venus Williams in 2015 and the first player to win her first nine hardcourt finals.

=== 2026: Wimbledon & US Open semifinals, Cincinnati champion ===
Gauff's 2026 season started in Australia at the United Cup, where she helped the defending US team advance to the semifinals to face Poland by defeating Solana Sierra and Maria Sakkari. In the semifinals, Gauff defeated Iga Swiatek in straight sets, however, Team United States eventually fell to Poland 2–1.

Coco Gauff practicing at the 2026 US Open

At the Australian Open, Gauff advanced to the quarterfinals where she was defeated by Elina Svitolina in straight sets.

Gauff moved on to the 2026 Qatar Ladies Open, where she lost her opening round to Elisabetta Cocciaretto, a lucky loser, in straight sets. At the Dubai Open, Gauff, as the third seed, defeated Anna Kalinskaya, Elise Mertens, and Alexandra Eala on her way to the semifinals, before falling to Svitolina in three sets in just over three hours.

As the fourth seed at Indian Wells, Gauff faced Eala again in the third round and was eliminated retiring due to an arm injury. However, she would go on to play in Miami, where she won her second round rematch against Cocciaretto in three sets. Gauff then defeated compatriot Alycia Parks in three sets to advance to the fourth round. Despite dropping the second set, Gauff would defeat Sorana Cîrstea in three sets to reach the quarterfinals for the first time in her career. Next, she defeated 12th seed Belinda Bencic. In the semifinals, she defeated Karolina Muchová to reach her first final at her home WTA 1000 event. Despite battling back to take the second set, Coco Gauff would eventually lose the final against Aryna Sabalenka in three sets.

At the Italian Open, Gauff defeated Tereza Valentova in straight sets in the second round. She then went on to earn comeback wins in her next three matches from a set down, defeating Solana Sierra, Iva Jovic and Mirra Andreeva to reach the semifinals. Gauff then advanced to the final for the second consecutive year, after defeating Sorana Cîrstea in straight sets. In the final, Gauff met Svitolina for the third time in 2026. Despite coming back to take the second set in a tiebreak, Gauff eventually lost the final in three sets. At the French Open, as the defending champion, she was upset by 28th seed Anastasia Potapova in the third round, after winning the first set, marking the first time she failed to reach at least the quarterfinals since 2020. As a result, Gauff fell from the top 5 in the singles rankings after 137 consecutive weeks.

Gauff came into Wimbledon without a grass-court win in two years. However, she beat Tamara Korpatsch in the first round. She reached the fourth round following three-set wins over Solana Sierra and qualifier Claire Liu. She came from a set down to beat No. 11 Belinda Bencic and reach the quarterfinals at Wimbledon for the first time. She came from a set down to defeat No. 4 Jessica Pegula and reach her first Wimbledon semifinal. She has now reached the semifinals at all four Grand Slam events. She lost in the semifinals to No. 9 Karolína Muchová, despite holding a match point in the third-set tiebreak.

Gauff then entered Toronto as the fourth seed where fell in three sets to Elena Rybakina in the semifinal. It was their second match in four years. Gauff then won her fourth WTA 1000 title in Cincinnati, defeating compatriot Jessica Pegula in straight sets.

Gauff advanced to the semifinal of 2026 US Open before being eliminated by Elena Rybakina.

In October, Gauff played in the China Open and fell in the Round of 16 to Elise Mertens in straight sets. She subsequently qualified for her 5th straight WTA Finals.

== Rivalries ==
=== Iga Świątek ===
Gauff and Iga Świątek have met 16 times since 2021, with Świątek controlling the head-to-head 11–5. Gauff lost to Świątek in her first major final at the 2022 French Open championships. They met again in the 2023 French Open quarterfinal, and the 2024 French Open semifinal, with Świątek winning each time. Gauff has won their last four meetings, including the 2024 WTA Finals and most recently at the 2026 United Cup.

=== Aryna Sabalenka ===
Gauff and Aryna Sabalenka have developed a noteworthy rivalry, competing in multiple major finals. Their contrasting demeanors and styles of play shine throughout in their matches. The two have met 13 times since 2020, with Sabalenka having the edge in their head-to-head at 7–6. Gauff won her first major title by defeating Sabalenka in the 2023 US Open final. Sabalenka would then defeat Gauff on her way to defending her title in the 2024 Australian Open semifinal. Gauff defeated Sabalenka in the 2024 WTA Finals semifinal on her way to winning the tournament. Gauff would then win her second major title at the 2025 French Open by defeating Sabalenka in three sets. After a close first set, Sabalenka avenged her French Open loss by knocking Gauff out of the 2025 WTA Finals where Gauff was the defending champion in straight sets. Gauff and Sabalenka would face off in the 2026 Miami final, where Sabalenka defeated Gauff in three sets.

== Playing style and coaching ==
While hard court is Gauff's favorite surface, she has yielded her best results on clay. Although many analysts would describe her as an "opportunistic counterpuncher", she describes herself as having a highly aggressive playing style and a powerful serve, while on the defensive side she uses her athleticism and speed to remain in points.

From July 2023 to September 2024 her coach was Brad Gilbert. Gilbert encouraged Gauff to put high, heavy topspin on her ball and to chase down balls in every corner of the court. In September 2024 Gauff hired coach Matt Daly, who has focused on improving her serve and forehand with a grip on her racket that is closer to the eastern backhand style rather than the more frequently used continental style. In August 2025, Gauff replaced Daly with Gavin MacMillan, a biomechanics specialist who helped rescue Aryna Sabalenka's serve.

== Endorsements ==
In 2018, after turning pro at the age of 14, Gauff signed with Team8, a sports management agency founded by Roger Federer and Tony Godsick.

In October 2018, New Balance officially announced a multi-year endorsement deal with Gauff. After her breakout run at 2019 Wimbledon, New Balance launched a "Call Me Coco" campaign to inform the public about her preferred name. In 2022, New Balance launched her first signature shoe, the Coco CG1. They also announced a long-term extension to their partnership. After she won the 2023 US Open, New Balance celebrated it by launching a "Call Me Champion" campaign, bringing back the original campaign slogan with a revision. In 2024, New Balance launched the second model of her signature shoe, the Coco CG2. In 2025, New Balance and Miu Miu launched a collaboration with Gauff, including co-branded versions of her signature shoe, the Coco CG2. Gauff wore clothing and footwear by New Balance x Miu Miu for her tournaments in Rome, Berlin and Cincinnati. In 2026, New Balance and Miu Miu launched a new collection which Gauff wore during Wimbledon. Gauff also wore the New Balance x Miu Miu 530 SL sneaker off court.

In December 2018, Gauff signed a long-term partnership with Head. In 2019, Gauff signed an endorsement deal with Barilla and became a Rolex Testimonee. In 2020, Gauff entered a partnership with Microsoft centered on analytics and education. In 2022, Gauff joined American Eagle for their spring campaign. In 2023, Gauff became an ambassador for advisory CPA firm Baker Tilly, signed an endorsement deal with Bose, became a brand partner of UPS, and starred in an advertisement for Ray Ban x Meta smart glasses. In 2024, Gauff signed multi-year partnerships with natural hair brand Carol's Daughter and Naked Juice, joining the latter as Chief Smoothie Officer. In 2025, Gauff joined Mercedes-Benz as a global brand ambassador.

== Other ventures ==
In June 2020, Gauff gave a speech at a Black Lives Matter protest in her hometown of Delray Beach, Florida, following the murder of George Floyd.

In January 2025, Gauff became an investor in Unrivaled, a professional women’s basketball league, to help elevate women’s sports.

In April 2025, Gauff left her longtime agency Team8 and launched her own management firm, Coco Gauff Enterprises, in partnership with WME. In September 2025, Gauff's media company, IROC, partnered with Religion of Sports for production and branded content. In August 2026, Tennis Channel released two short documentaries: Serve: Fashion & Tennis and The Zina Effect, executive produced by Gauff. Gauff featured in the music video for American rapper Gunna's October 2026 single "Pop It".

== Personal life ==
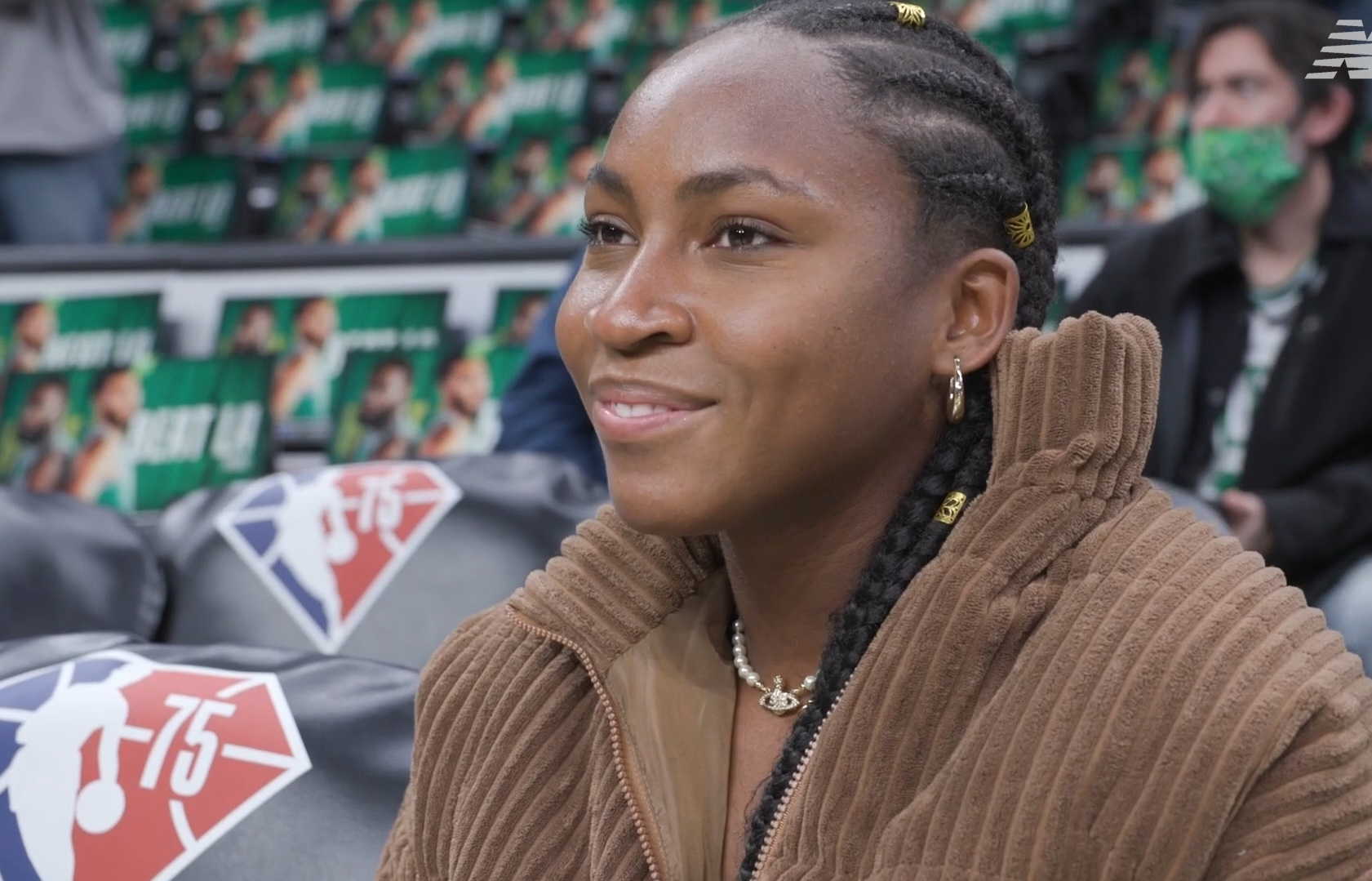
Gauff in 2022

Gauff is a Christian. Since she was eight years old, she has prayed with her father before every match that she and her opponent would be safe. After winning the Cincinnati Open in August 2023, she said: "... I'd like to thank my Lord and Savior, Jesus Christ. I spent a lot of nights alone, crying trying to figure it out. I still have a lot to figure out, but I thank Him for covering me." After winning her first major title in September 2023, she said: "... I don't pray for results, I just ask that I get the strength to give it my all and whatever happens happens. I'm so blessed in this life."

Gauff's tennis idols are Serena and Venus Williams. "Serena Williams has always been my idol...and Venus," she has said. "They are the reason why I wanted to pick up a tennis racquet." Gauff first met Serena when she won the Little Mo' national tournament at the age of eight, and later met her again to film a commercial for Delta Air Lines and at the Mouratoglou Academy. After defeating Venus Williams at Wimbledon in 2019, Gauff expressed her respect when they shook hands at the net. "I was just telling her thank you for everything she's done for the sport," Gauff said. "She's been an inspiration for many people. I was just really telling her thank you."

Gauff stated in 2020 that she had experienced depression and stress related to her sporting career, though her parents clarified that she was not diagnosed with depression in the clinical sense, and had not sought medical attention relating to her psychological well-being.

Gauff is a fan of anime, including My Hero Academia. She runs an "editing account" on TikTok, mainly of anime dramas.

Gauff is a fan of popular YouTubers and streamers Ludwig Ahgren, Valkyrae, and Kai Cenat.

In July 2023, Gauff and actress Storm Reid helped fund a new playground and purple-painted tennis courts in East Atlanta's Brownwood Park.

== Career statistics ==
=== Grand Slam tournament performance timelines ===
Key
W	F	SF	QF	#R	RR	Q#	DNQ	A	NH

(W) winner; (F) finalist; (SF) semifinalist; (QF) quarterfinalist; (#R) rounds 4, 3, 2, 1; (RR) round-robin stage; (Q#) qualification round; (DNQ) did not qualify; (A) absent; (NH) not held; (SR) strike rate (events won / competed); (W–L) win–loss record.
To avoid confusion and double counting, these charts are updated at the conclusion of a tournament or when the player's participation has ended.

==== Singles ====
Tournament	2019	2020	2021	2022	2023	2024	2025	2026	SR	W–L	Win %
Australian Open	A	4R	2R	1R	4R	SF	QF	QF	0 / 7	20–7	74%
French Open	Q2	2R	QF	F	QF	SF	W	3R	1 / 7	29–6	83%
Wimbledon	4R	NH	4R	3R	1R	4R	1R	SF	0 / 7	16–7	70%
US Open	3R	1R	2R	QF	W	4R	4R	SF	1 / 8	25–7	78%
Win–loss	5–2	4–3	9–4	12–4	14–3	16–4	14–3	16–4	2 / 29	90–27	77%

==== Doubles ====
Tournament	2019	2020	2021	2022	2023	2024	2025	2026	SR	W–L	Win %
Australian Open	A	QF	QF	1R	SF	A	A	A	0 / 4	10–4	71%
French Open	1R	3R	1R	F	SF	W	A	A	1 / 6	17–5	77%
Wimbledon	A	NH	3R	A	3R	QF	A	A	0 / 3	7–3	70%
US Open	3R	2R	F	1R	QF	A	A	A	0 / 5	11–5	69%
Win–loss	2–2	6–3	10–4	5–3	13–4	9–1	0–0	0–0	1 / 18	45–17	73%

=== Grand Slam tournament finals ===
==== Singles: 3 (2 titles, 1 runner-up) ====
Result	Year	Tournament	Surface	Opponent	Score
Loss	2022	French Open	Clay	(Poland) Iga Świątek	1–6, 3–6
Win	2023	US Open	Hard	Aryna Sabalenka	2–6, 6–3, 6–2
Win	2025	French Open	Clay	Aryna Sabalenka	6–7^{(5–7)}, 6–2, 6–4

==== Doubles: 3 (1 title, 2 runner-ups) ====
Result	Year	Tournament	Surface	Partner	Opponents	Score
Loss	2021	US Open	Hard	(United States) Caty McNally	(Australia) Samantha Stosur (China) Zhang Shuai	3–6, 6–3, 3–6
Loss	2022	French Open	Clay	(United States) Jessica Pegula	(France) Caroline Garcia (France) Kristina Mladenovic	6–2, 3–6, 2–6
Win	2024	French Open	Clay	(Czech Republic) Kateřina Siniaková	(Italy) Sara Errani (Italy) Jasmine Paolini	7–6^{(7–5)}, 6–3

=== Year-end championships (WTA Finals) ===
==== Singles: 1 (title) ====
Result	Year	Tournament	Surface	Opponent	Score
Win	2024	WTA Finals, Saudi Arabia	Hard (i)	(China) Zheng Qinwen	3–6, 6–4, 7–6^{(7–2)}

Sporting positions
Preceded by Whitney Osuigwe	Orange Bowl Girls' Singles Champion; Category: 18 and under 2018	Succeeded by Robin Montgomery

Olympic Games
Preceded by Sue Bird; Eddy Alvarez	Flagbearer for United States; Paris 2024; With: LeBron James	Succeeded by Incumbent
