= Madison Theatre (Atlanta) =

Former theater in East Atlanta, Georgia

Coordinates: 33.7407°N 84.3456°W

Madison Theater is a historic 1927 theater building in East Atlanta, Georgia. It was designed by Daniell & Beutell in a Moorish Revival architecture style and opened with 600 seats. It is at 496 Flat Shoals Avenue. It closed in the 1970s after a period of being used as an art house cinema. The front of the theater has been converted into several storefronts and the theater space is being used for storage. Features of the theater once included gargoyles, an organ, and fine furnishings. It was listed as endangered in 2018 by the Georgia Trust for Historic Preservation.
