= East Atlanta =

Neighborhood in Atlanta, Georgia, USA

Coordinates: 33.74001°N 84.34546°W

East Atlanta is a neighborhood on the east side of Atlanta, Georgia, United States. The name East Atlanta Village primarily refers to the neighborhood's commercial district.

== Geography ==
East Atlanta lies entirely within DeKalb County and is bounded by:

- Interstate 20, Edgewood and Kirkwood to the north.
- Moreland Avenue, and the neighborhoods of North Ormewood Park, Ormewood Park and Woodland Hills, to the west.
- Parts of unincorporated DeKalb County, such as Gresham Park Candler-McAfee Decatur, share borders with East Atlanta to the south and east.

== History ==
=== Early history ===
Prior to the arrival of American colonists, the area had been dominated by the Creek Native American people. The Sandtown-Flat Shoals Trail existed along high ground as part of a trade route system between the Chattahoochee River and the coast. This trail would eventually become Flat Shoals Avenue. After the forcible removal of the Creek in the 1820s, American citizens began acquiring land in the area through the Georgia land lotteries.

=== Civil War ===
During the Civil War, Atlanta became a major supply hub of the southern war effort and a major target of the northern war effort. Lemuel P. Grant designed the city's fortifications to protect his plantation on the eastside of the city in what is now Grant Park. General James B. McPherson placed his Yankee forces on high ground a mile east of Grant's plantation, the area today known as East Atlanta.

A Union cannon was placed at the intersection of Glenwood Avenue and Flat Shoals Road to protect the flank of the front line. The Confederate forces were able to attack from behind, however. The Battle of Atlanta, which was part of the Atlanta campaign and sealed the fate of the Confederacy, was fought in East Atlanta behind Union lines resulting in more than 12,000 deaths. Today many historic markers dot the neighborhood including two upturned cannons where Confederate General Walker and Union General McPherson were killed.

=== Reconstruction Era ===
East Atlanta recovered after the Civil War, quickly becoming a developing unincorporated town. The Marbut and Minor Mercantile Store was soon established at the crossroads of Glenwood Avenue and Flat Shoals Road. By the late 1890s, the store had grown to encompass five different businesses including a dry goods store, feed and seed, blacksmith, livery stable, and grocery store. Asa Candler, Joel Hurt, Frederic Patterson, and Aaron Haas, founders of the Metropolitan Streetcar Company, developed the McPherson Park subdivision to provide ridership for their electric streetcar line and housing for new store clerks in the area.

=== 20th Century ===
In 1905, lumber and railroad baron William Zuber built a large white columned frame mansion as a wedding present for his new bride on property that fronts Flat Shoals. The house is currently listed on the National Register of Historic Places. The East Atlanta Banking Company entered the East Atlanta community in 1911, moving into its new building at Flat Shoals and Glenwood - shaped like an old fashioned "flat iron". The building is now home to a bar (appropriately named "Flatiron"). A post office, a newspaper, a silent movie theatre and a carriage dealership were also added to the commercial district and Baptist and Methodist congregations in the area immediately began to grow.

The land to the south of Glenwood Avenue was owned by former Georgia Governor Joseph Emerson Brown. With Brown's support, a grid of streets was planned around a 13-acre (53,000 m^{2}) public green space, a model for the "urban utopian living" that was being touted at the time. After 1915, in a series of votes, East Atlanta residents chose to be annexed into the city limits of Atlanta in order to gain access to fire protection and public education. Water and sewer service also enabled residents to enjoy indoor plumbing.

After World War II the undeveloped center of the neighborhood was subdivided and developed by the Williams brothers who were born and raised in East Atlanta and had built a lumber and concrete business nearby on Glenwood Avenue. As the residential area grew, nearby businesses prospered. The Madison Theatre talking picture show and a new public library were built with the help of public donations.

During the 1960s, East Atlanta was targeted by civil rights groups as an example of racial segregation of housing because members of the white-supremacy group Ku Klux Klan lived in an adjacent neighborhood. Under the protection of the Fair Housing Act, middle-class black families were assisted in efforts to purchase houses in the area. In response, many white families left the area, selling their homes for as low as $1,500 for a 3-bedroom home. Eventually, East Atlanta real estate was valued much lower than other areas of the city. The neighborhood's appearance and reputation suffered as a result. In 1981, the East Atlanta Community Association was founded to bolster a sense of community in the neighborhood.

=== 21st Century ===
In 2005 East Atlanta acquired a new library building which is located at the corner of Flat Shoals and McPherson. That same year, the first phase of a public works project to enhance the pedestrian environment in the business district occurred. The result was much wider sidewalks and benches to sit on. In 2007 and 2008, the East Atlanta Village was voted "Best Neighborhood" in the city by readers of the Atlanta weekly newspaper Creative Loafing. Due to determined efforts by residents to improve their neighborhood and demand for affordable in-town housing, the average price of a house in East Atlanta has risen steadily since the late 1990s.

In 2017 the East Atlanta Community Association began efforts to include the neighborhood on the National Register of Historic Places.

== Culture ==
In recent decades, East Atlanta has seen a rise of street art. Many of East Atlanta's murals were brought to the neighborhood by Living Walls and the Outerspace Project. Some of East Atlanta's murals are easily visible from the street, but an equal number of murals are hidden in back parking lots, alleyways and behind buildings. Images and locations of East Atlanta's murals are found on the Atlanta Street Art Map.

== Events ==
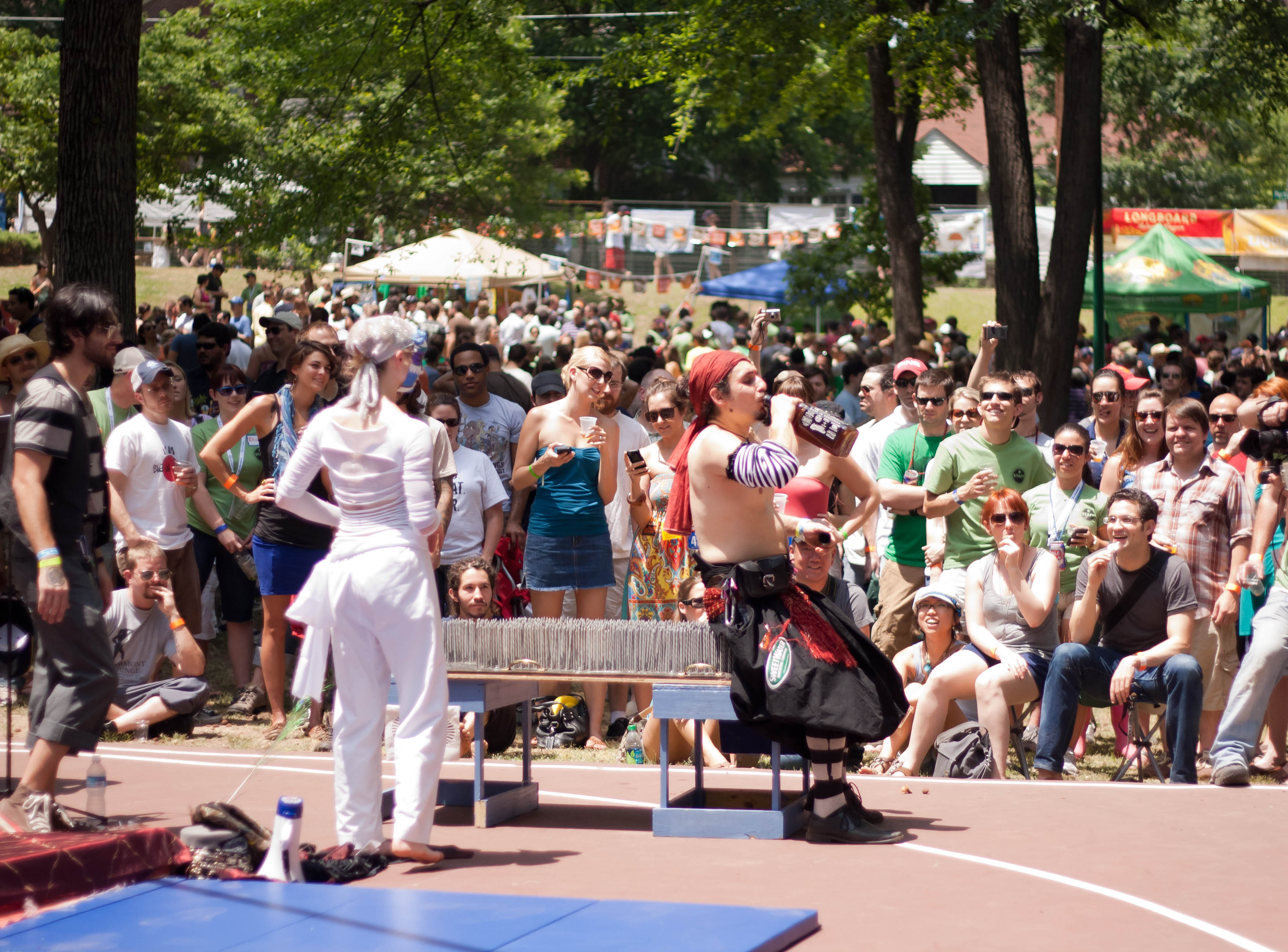
East Atlanta Beer Fest

East Atlanta hosts a number of popular annual events, including:

- East Atlanta Strut - East Atlanta's free annual one day neighborhood festival, always on the third Saturday in September featuring a parade, food, live music, art, and events. The festival is held to highlight the businesses in East Atlanta Village as well as raise funds for schools, senior programs and Neighbor In Need East Atlanta. The Festival is run completely with Volunteers.
- B*ATL - Neighborhood festival commemorating the anniversary of the Civil War's Battle of Atlanta, which was fought on July 22, 1864 on land that is now part of East Atlanta. Events include a period costume gala dinner and house tour; a 5K fun run; van and walking tours of neighborhood historic sites including Oakland Cemetery; Civil War Battle re-enactment featuring soldiers, live artillery, and civilian re-enactors; and historic music concerts.
- East Atlanta Craft Beer Festival - Annual one day craft beer festival held the third weekend in May at Brownwood Park in East Atlanta, Georgia. Festival includes over 230 beers from all regions of the planet, music and food vendors. Produced by The East Atlanta Foundation, a 501c3 non profit, 100% of proceeds benefit local charities via a grant process that serves the Atlanta Community.
- East Atlanta Twilight Criterium - A day of bicycle races and events that takes place in East Atlanta Village and the surrounding residential streets every August.
- EAV Farmers Market - A local non-profit farmers market each Thursday evening (4:00 to dark) from April through December.

== Education ==
=== Schools ===
==== Public schools ====
East Atlanta is in the Atlanta Public Schools System and nearby charter school alternatives are also available.

- Burgess Peterson Academy - Elementary school in the Atlanta Public School system and part of the Maynard Jackson Cluster.
- Atlanta Neighborhood Charter School
- Wesley International Academy
- Ronald E. McNair High School, a public 9-12 school in unincorporated DeKalb County sits immediately east of the Atlanta city limits on Bouldercrest Road

==== Private schools ====
- Mohammed Schools, a private K-12 school in unincorporated DeKalb County.

=== Library ===
Atlanta–Fulton Public Library System operates the East Atlanta Branch.

== See also ==
- The EARL (East Atlanta Restaurant and Lounge)
- Neighborhood planning unit - East Atlanta is within NPU-W in the City of Atlanta.
- Table of Atlanta neighborhoods by population
