= Mohammed Schools =

Private school system in Georgia, United States

Coordinates: 33°44′12″N 84°18′53″W

Mohammed Schools of Atlanta is a 3K–12 private school system founded by the Atlanta Masjid of Al-Islam in an unincorporated area of DeKalb County, Georgia, United States, near Atlanta. The system is located in the East Atlanta area.

The schools are administered by the Atlanta Masjid of Islam. As of 2001, about 300 students attend the schools.

The elementary and middle schools within the system are called Sister Clara Mohammed School, and the high school within Mohammed Schools is Warith Deen Mohammad High School (WDMH). It is the only K–12 Islamic School school campus in Metro Atlanta.

== History ==
The school system was founded in 1980, and named the Clara Mohammed School. In 1989 the high school component was renamed after Warith Deen Mohammed.

In the 1990s the school announced that it would do an overhaul. Ground was broken for a new gymnasium in 1998. The renovation was scheduled as a six-month project, but completion took longer due to fluctuations in donations and volunteers. The renovation, which overhauled classrooms, the gymnasium, and science laboratories, was completed in 2001.

As of 2007, Mohammed Schools has no special education teachers.

== Notable alumni ==
- Ousman Krubally (born 1988), American-Gambian basketball player in the Basketball Bundesliga
