= Atlanta Memorial Park =

Public park in Georgia

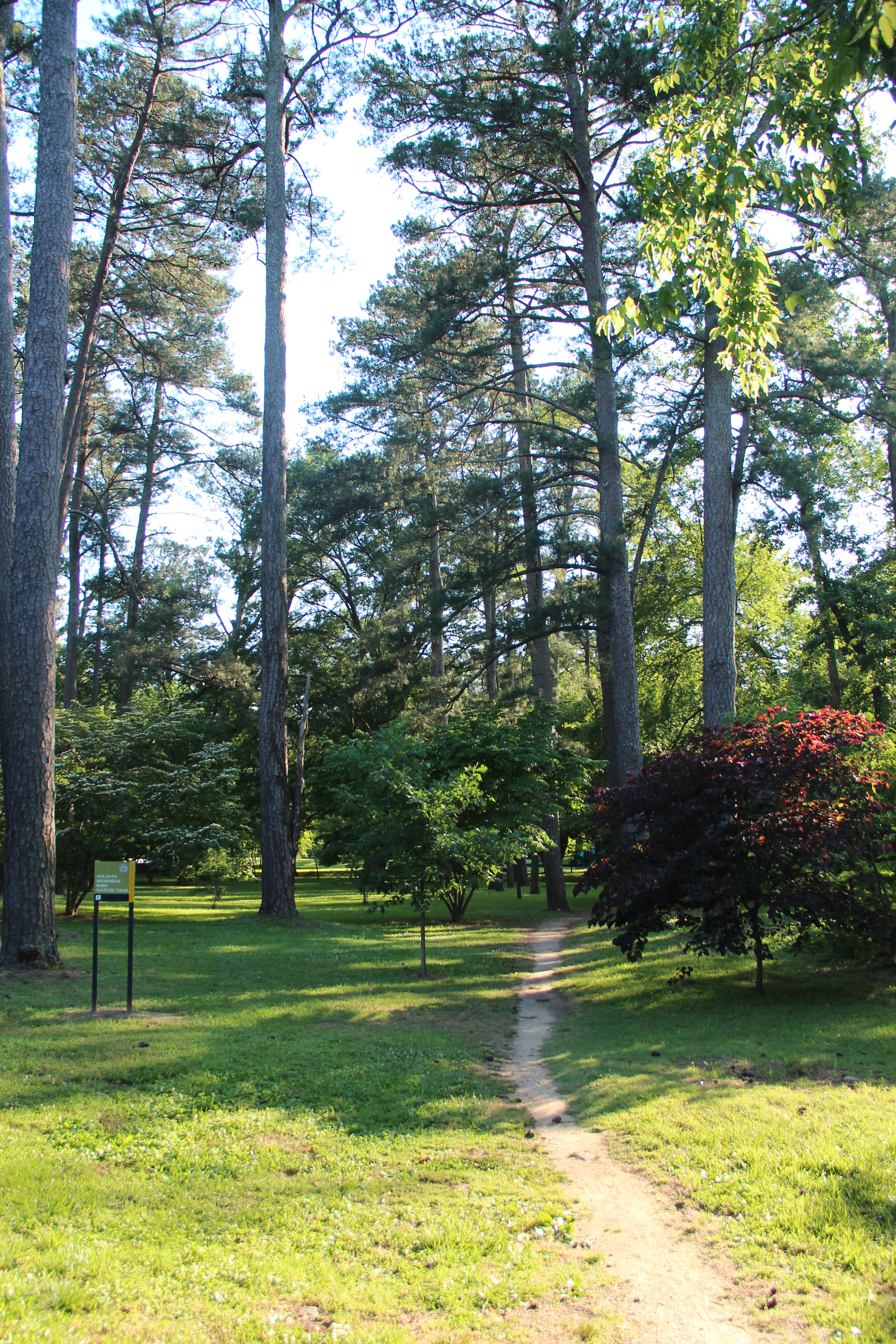
- Atlanta Memorial Park (2016)

- Location within Atlanta Location within Georgia Location within the United States
- Interactive map of Atlanta Memorial Park
- Location: 384 Woodward Way NW; Atlanta, Georgia
- Coordinates: 33°49′2.676″N 84°24′5.0868″W
- Created: 1933

Atlanta Memorial Park is a public park in the Buckhead district of Atlanta, Georgia. The approximately 200-acre (81 ha) park lies adjacent to Peachtree Creek, a tributary of the Chattahoochee River. The park is a memorial to those who died in the Battle of Peachtree Creek, which took place on parts of this park and nearby Tanyard Creek Park.

== History ==
The park's location along Peachtree Creek had been the site of the Battle of Peachtree Creek, a major battle in the Atlanta Campaign of the American Civil War. In 1929, former Georgia Governor M. Hoke Smith and others donated the land to the city of Atlanta for the purposes of creating a park. An adjoining golf course, named after Bobby Jones, was built in 1931, while construction on the park began in 1933. The park's location on the creek's floodplain makes it susceptible to occasional flooding.

In 2011, the Atlanta Memorial Park Conservancy was founded to manage the park, and in 2014 it hosted a massive cleanup that removed over 2 tons of litter from the park and creek. Between 2017 and 2019, the park saw several renovations, including the installation of a new playground, improvements to the park's sewage system, the creation of a nature trail, and new sidewalks.

== Bibliography ==
- Habersham, Raisa (May 17, 2019). "Yearlong sidewalk project begins Monday at popular Buckhead park". The Atlanta Journal-Constitution. Cox Enterprises.
- Hardrich, Shelagh MaRee (January 30, 2017). "Atlanta's Memorial Park now has new playground". The Atlanta Journal-Constitution. Cox Enterprises.
- Johnson, Leslie (July 26, 2017). "Atlanta inspecting, cleaning sewers at city park". The Atlanta Journal-Constitution. Cox Enterprises.
- Kahn, Michael (January 17, 2018). "Parks across Atlanta are destined for some sweet upgrades in 2018". Curbed Atlanta. Vox Media. Archived from the original on January 20, 2018.
- Leslie, Katie (February 9, 2016). "Buckhead residents up in arms over polluted park". The Atlanta Journal-Constitution. Cox Enterprises.
- Rao, Devika (March 24, 2014). "Doing Good: Volunteers clear tons of trash from local creek". The Atlanta Journal-Constitution. Cox Enterprises.
- Warren, Karon (July 18, 2018). "10 Atlanta parks to host an outdoor event on the cheap, mapped". Curbed Atlanta. Cox Enterprises. Archived from the original on July 18, 2018.
