= Lanier Boulevard Parkway =

Park in Atlanta, Georgia, United States

Coordinates: 33°46′51.7″N 84°21′11.1″W

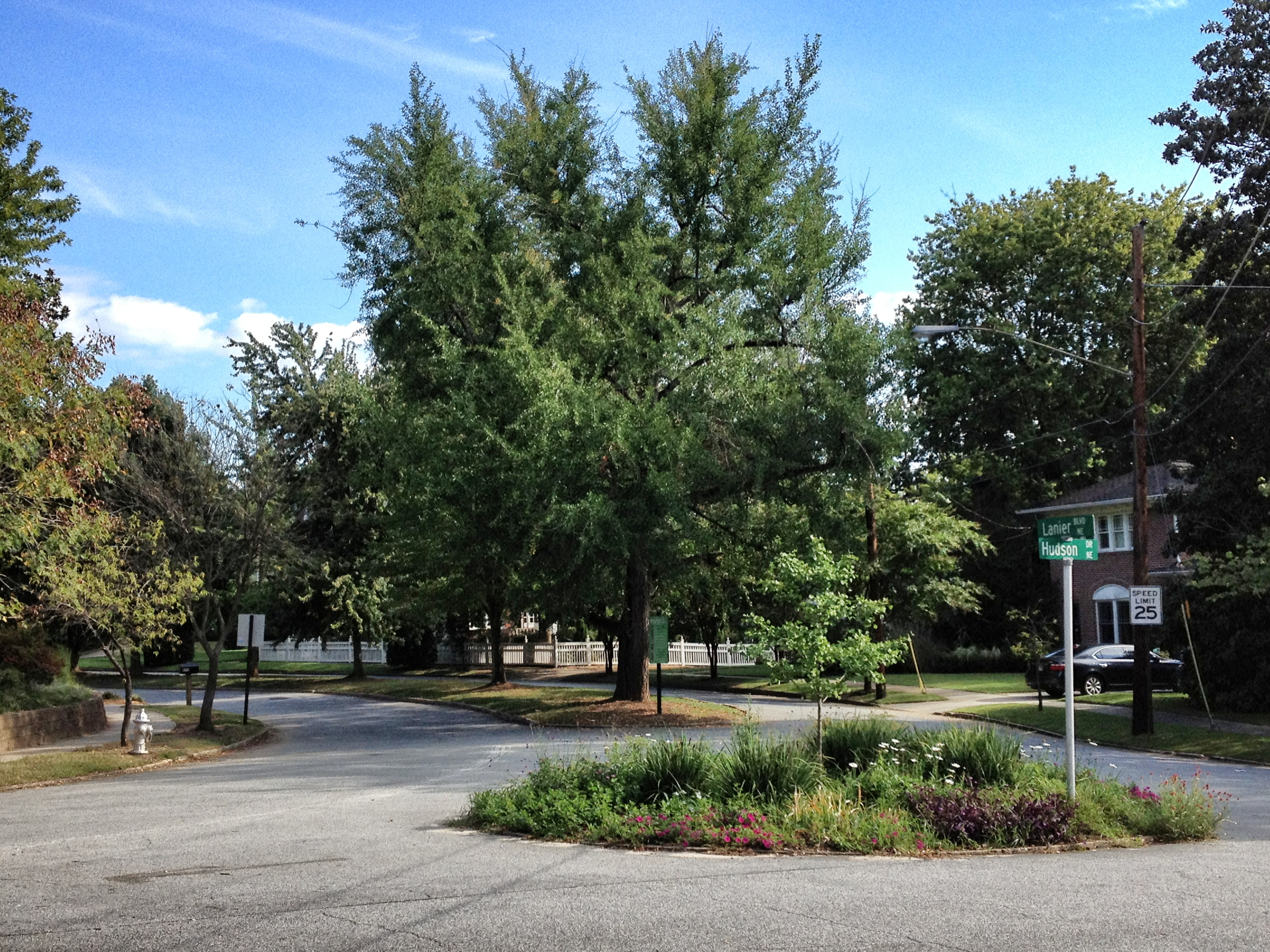
Lanier Boulevard Parkway at Hudson Drive near its southern end

Lanier Boulevard Parkway is a 2.1-acre (0.85 ha) park in Atlanta, Georgia. It is located in the 1-mile (1.6 km)-long median of Lanier Boulevard in the Virginia Highland and Morningside/Lenox Park neighborhoods.
