= Brownwood Park =

Park in Georgia, United States of America

- Interactive map of Brownwood Park
- Type: Community
- Location: Atlanta, Georgia, USA
- Coordinates: 33.738031°N 84.346782°W
- Area: 12.33 acres (49,900 m^{2})
- Owner: City of Atlanta

Brownwood Park is a 12.33-acre (4.99 ha) community park located within the East Atlanta neighborhood of Atlanta, Georgia, US.

The Brownwood Park Recreation Center serves as a headquarters for the East Atlanta Kids Club, an after-school mentoring and tutoring program.

In July 2023 tennis player Coco Gauff and actress Storm Reid helped fund a new playground and purple-painted tennis courts in Brownwood Park.
