= Proctor Creek (Chattahoochee River tributary) =

Stream in Georgia, USA

Coordinates: 33°48′27.48″N 84°29′44.95″W

Proctor Creek is a 16-square mile creek in the U.S. state of Georgia, named after John Proctor, the proprietor of a local mill. It is considered a tributary to the Chattahoochee River because a tributary is a small stream that leads into a larger stream, river, or lake.

Proctor Creek begins in the English Avenue neighborhood of Atlanta and flows 9 miles until it ends in the Chattahoochee River. The creek is the only major tributary and watershed in Northwest Atlanta, providing about 70% of the city's water to the 35 neighborhoods and 60,000 people that surround it.

== History ==
=== The 1800s ===
Atlanta had a sewer system that would transport storm runoff and wastewater into the Proctor Creek watershed. By implementing this system, the wastewater was carried out of the city and to rural areas. However, this did not prevent recreation or use of the area. Many families played in the Proctor Creek watershed, and there is a history of many baptisms occurring in the waters.

=== The 1900s ===
By the 1900s, Atlanta attempted to solve this issue by improving the sewer system to prevent pollution from reaching the watershed. However, during heavy storms, the system has the potential to flood into creeks. The infrastructure has improved greatly, save for the North Avenue sub-basin, which is too expensive to refine, leaving it vulnerable to floods.

=== The 2000s ===
In 2002, Vine City, a neighborhood overlapping the Proctor Creek watershed suffered from extreme flooding from a storm. Parts of this flooding area later was dedicated to create Rodney Cook, Sr. Park, which honors many African American and Civil Rights influences from Atlanta. Rodney Cook, Sr., himself, specifically requested a park to be established in Vine City, so the City of Atlanta Department of Parks and Recreation, the City of Atlanta Department of Watershed Management, The National Monuments Foundation, The Trust for Public Land, and the Vine City mayor's office aided in this pursuit to respect his wishes. This park was built with a substantive retention pond designed to contain 100-year flood waters.

In 2013, Proctor Creek was acknowledged as one of 19 priority Urban Waters in the United States of America by the Urban Waters Federal Partnership (UWFP). By partnering with this organization, Proctor Creek receives environmental aid from nine federal agencies aiming to improve ecological challenges. Being a part of the UWFP gives Proctor Creek better access to green infrastructure, which can improve water quality, greenspaces, and general public health.

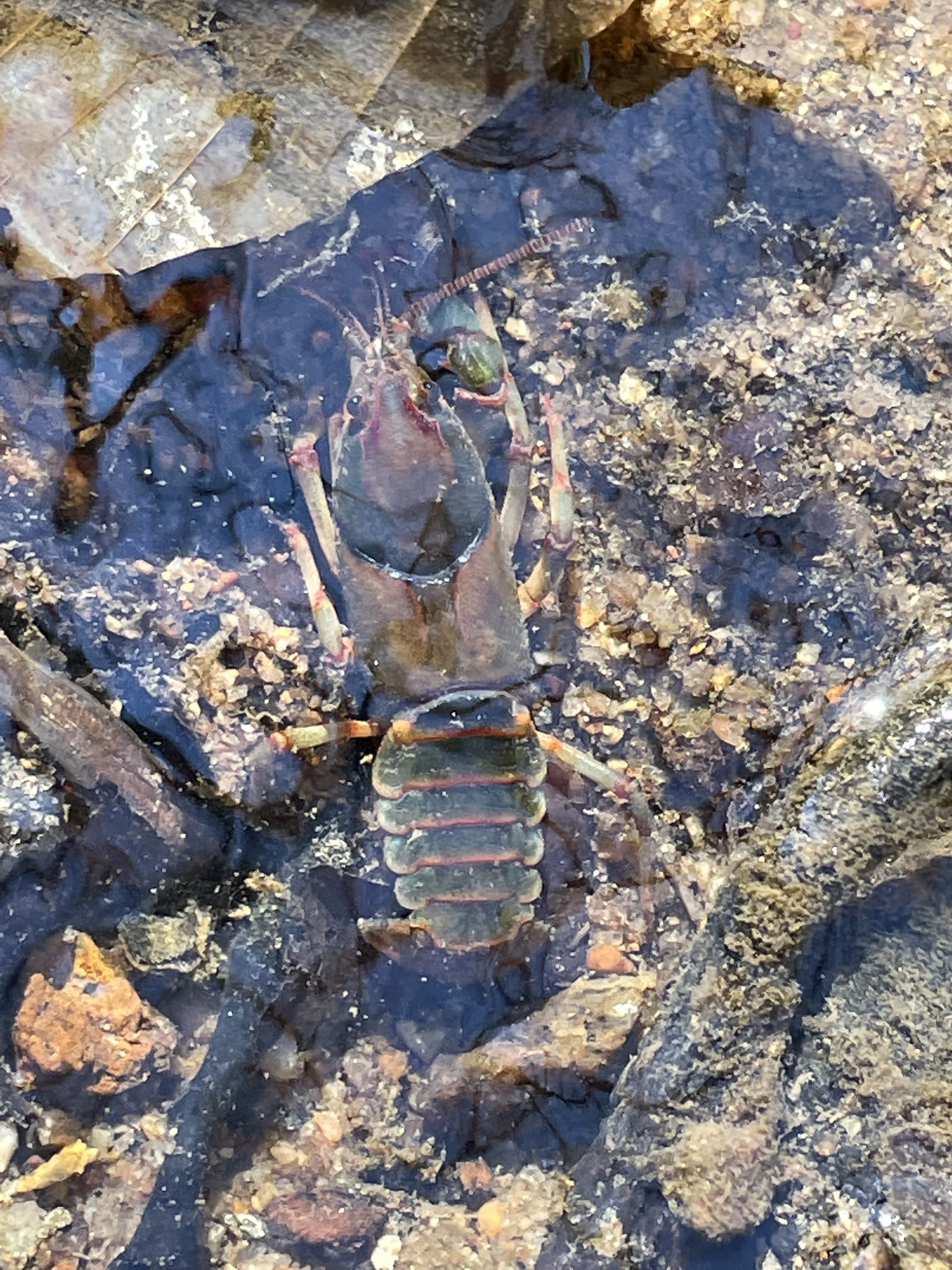
The Chattahoochee crayfish (Cambarus howardi)

In 2016, the United States Fish and Wildlife Service joined UWFP in an initiative called the Proctor Creek Ecosystem Restoration Feasibility Study to gain knowledge on endangered marine life such as the Chattahoochee crayfish.

In 2017, the United States Fish and Wildlife Service conducted community-based research on the Proctor Creek watershed. The West Atlanta Watershed Alliance helped to gather participants and survey the area.

In 2018, the United States Army Corps of Engineers provided funding to the United States Fish and Wildlife Service to maintain their study on the Proctor Creek habitats. The main process to conduct this study was called Integrated Water Resource Management. Using the results gathered from this method allowed the city of Atlanta to better manage economic challenges in the city while maintaining the environmental health of the Proctor Creek watershed. The United States Environmental Protection Agency provided aid for water quality testing, and the United States Geological Survey helped place stream gauges at three of eleven sampling sites along the watershed.

In 2020, Georgia Institute of Technology students tested two trash collection technologies on the creek. These technologies were The Litter Gitter, produced by Osprey Initiative, and The Bandalong Litter Trap, produced by Storm Water Systems Inc. Five Litter Gitters were installed at three different locations along the creek, but only one Bandalong was installed because it was built for larger debris and floods. After using these technologies, the trash was analyzed to determine the age, weight, type, and amount. This is helpful to determining where the trash came from. By the end of June 2020, 454.22 pounds of recyclables and 1,040.52 pounds of trash were removed from Proctor Creek. Groundwork Atlanta and the West Atlanta Watershed Alliance attempted to expand this project, but efforts were cut short after the COVID-19 pandemic.

As of 2025, the EPA is sampling water and sediment around the Proctor Creek area to improve knowledge of the watershed's health. The United States Geological Survey is aiding in this activity by providing flow gauges at three locations along the creek.

== Significant people and places around the watershed ==
The area around the watershed hosts the Atlanta University Center, which is home to Clark Atlanta University, Spelman College, Morehouse College, and the Morehouse School of Medicine. Colleges such as Georgia Institute of Technology, Emory University, and Georgia State University are also located in the area.

Furthermore, neighborhoods such as English Avenue, Vine City, Castleberry Hill, and Ashview Heights were homes to notable people like Martin Luther King Jr., Coretta Scott King, Maynard Jackson, Andrew Young, and Julian Bond.

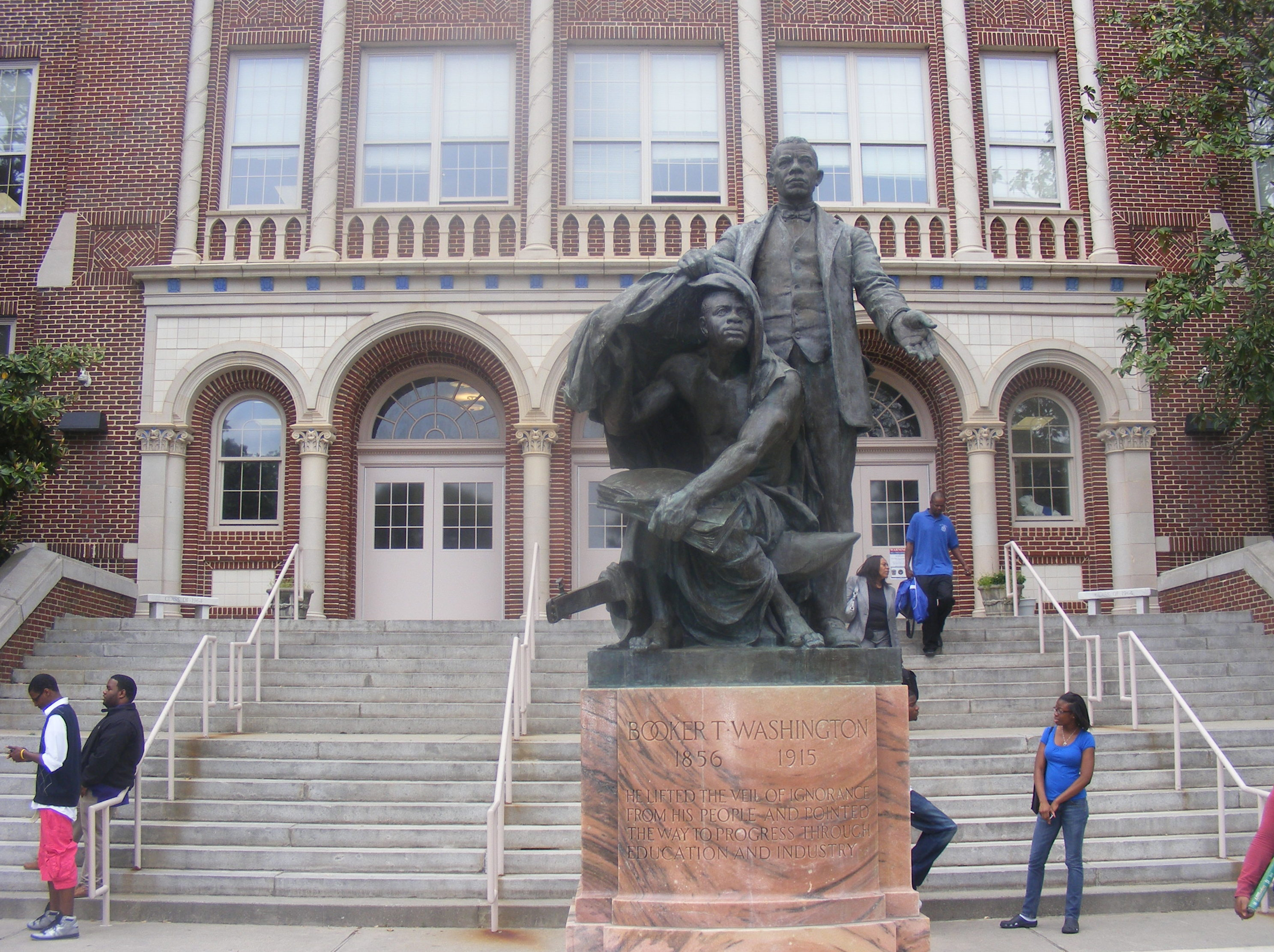
Booker T. Washington High School

In 1919, Washington Park was established as Atlanta's first public park opened to African Americans.

In 1924, Booker T. Washington High School was established as the first public high school for African Americans in Georgia.

Most recently, many popular businesses have arrived to the area. These businesses include Chick-fil-A, The Coca Cola Company, Delta Air Lines, UPS, Kaiser Permanente, the Georgia Aquarium, and the Mercedes-Benz Stadium.

== Ecosystem ==
Proctor Creek has a history of pollution erosion and bacteria due to the sewer and storm water runoff issues in the 1800s. However, more recently, the creek has faced illegal tire and litter dumping, as well.

As mentioned above, in 2017, leaders from the West Atlanta Watershed Alliance and the United States Fish and Wildlife Service gathered local participants to collect samples of the creek. These samples included measurements of dissolved oxygen, temperature, pH, fauna, and fish type. Some tools used were kick nets, crayfish traps, backpack electroshockers of 350 Hz, and general photography.

According to this survey, there are 28 aquatic species present in the watershed, as listed below.

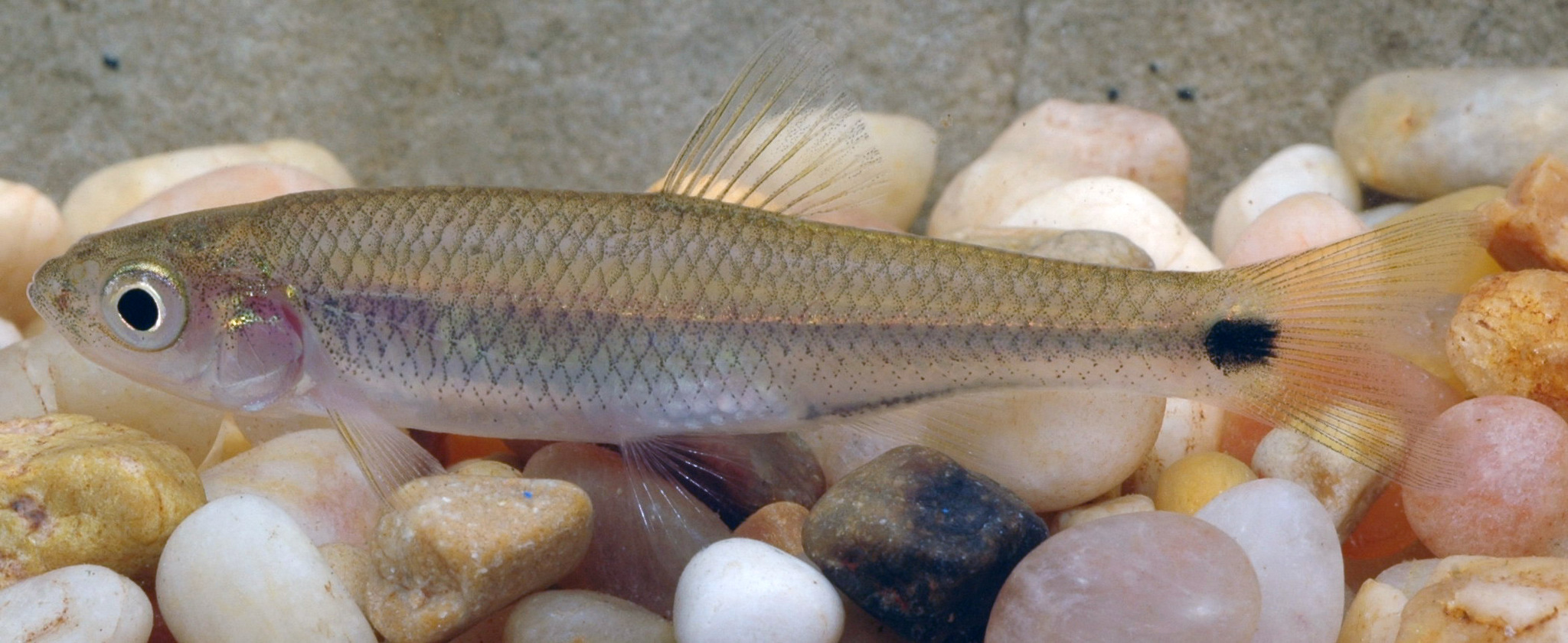
Blacktail Shiner (Cyprinella venusta)

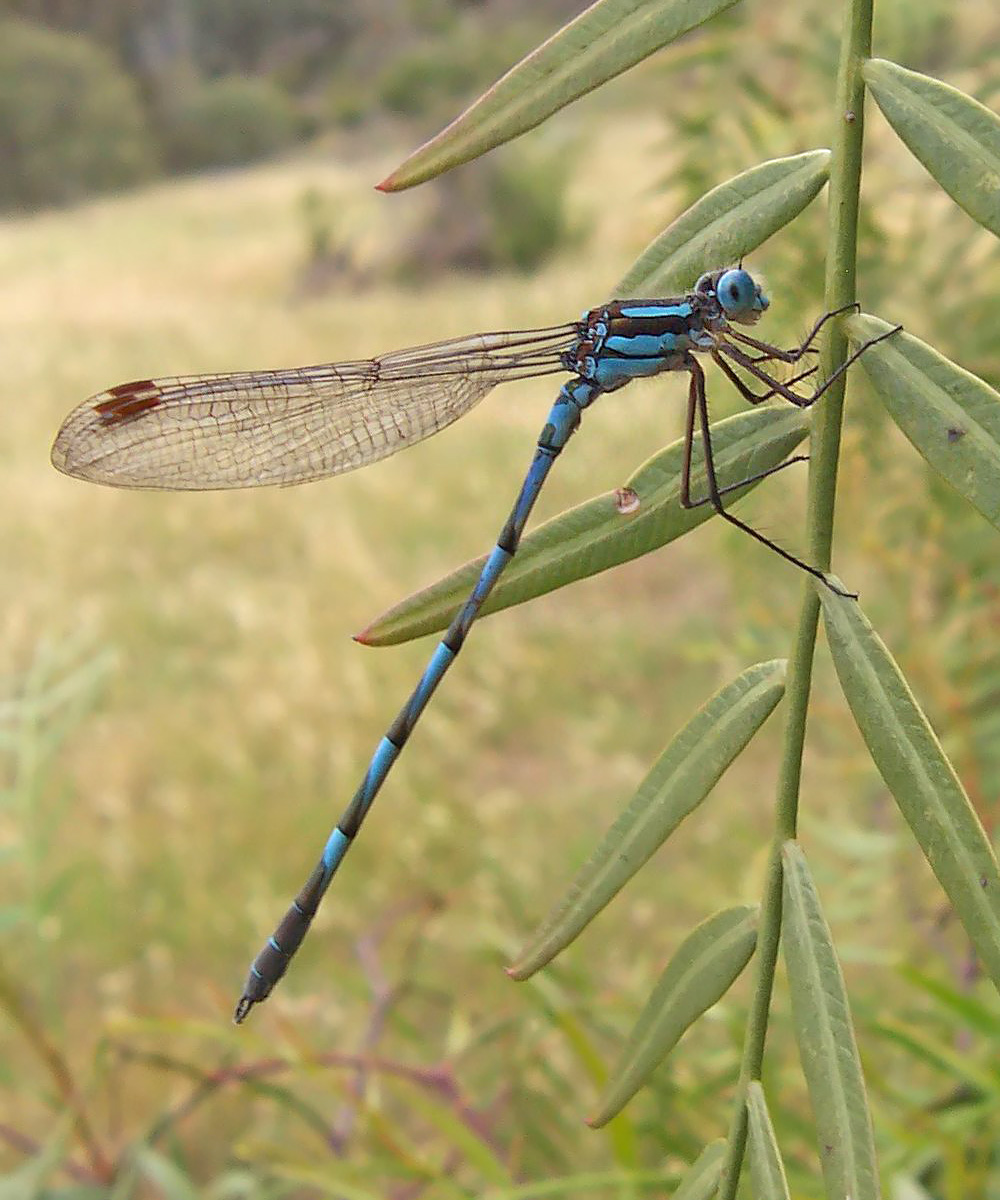
Common Blue Damselfly

Fish

- White Sucker (Catostomus commersonii)
- Red Shiner (Cyprinella lutrensis)
- Blacktail Shiner (Cyprinella venusta)
- Eastern Mosquitofish (Gambusia affinis)
- Redbreast Sunfish (Lepomis auritus)
- Green Sunfish (Lepomis cyanellus)
- Bluegill (Lepomis macrochirus)
- Golden Shiner (Notemigonus crysoleucas)
- Spottail Shiner (Notropis hudsonius)
- Blackbanded Darter (Percina nigrofasciata)
- Black Crappie (Pomoxis nigromaculatus)

Invertebrate

- Variable crayfish (Cambarus latimanus)
- Water Striper spp. (Family Gerridae spp.)
- Rhinoceros Beetle spp. (Family Scarabidae spp.)
- Mayfly lava spp. (Order Ephemeroptera spp.)
- Damselfly spp. (Order Odonata spp.)
- Aquatic Worm spp. (Phylum Annelida spp.)
- White tubercled crayfish (Procambarus spiculifer)

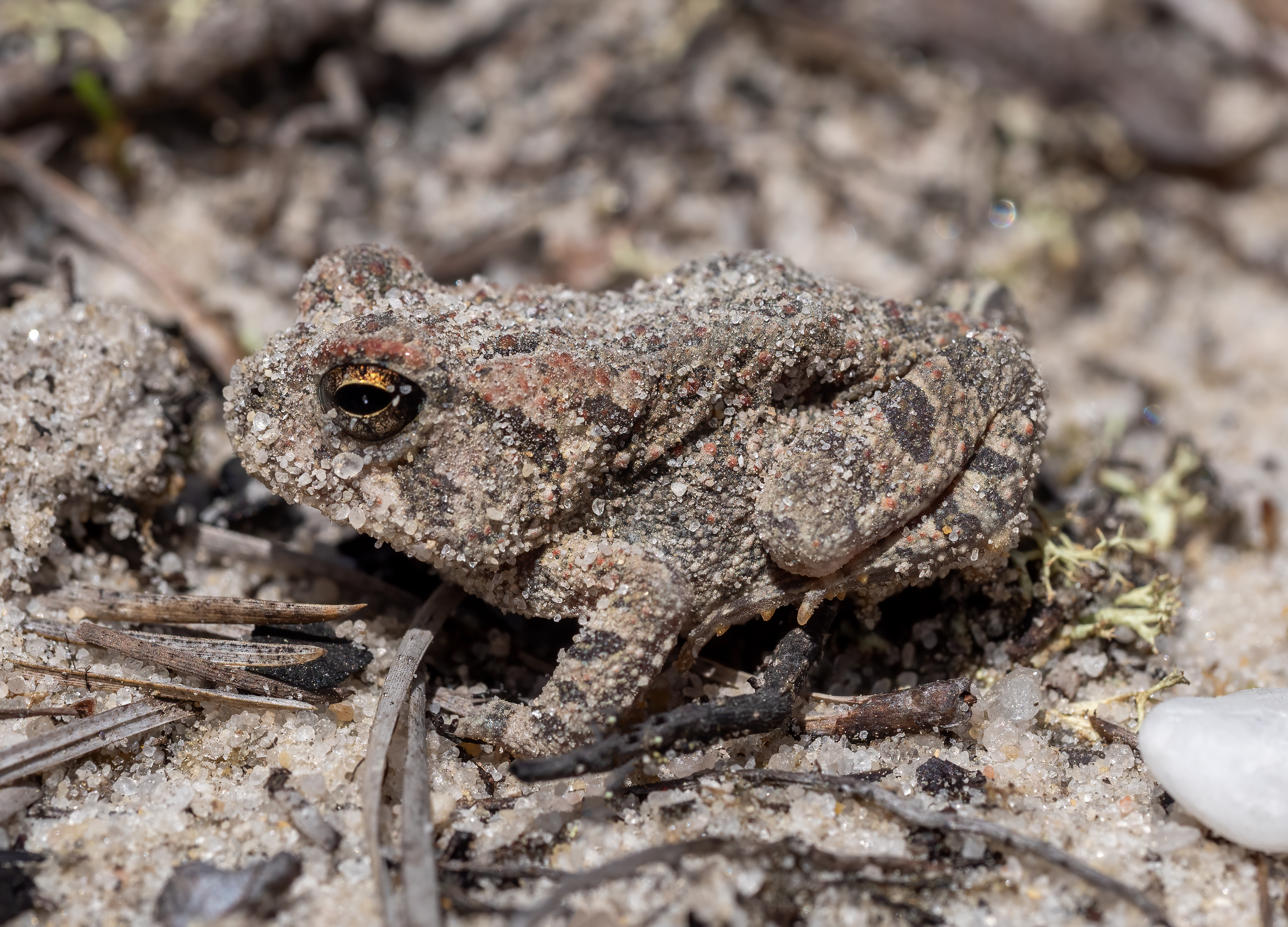
Fowler's Toad (Bufo fowleri)

Amphibians

- Fowler's Toad (Bufo fowleri)
- Dusky Salamander (Desmognathus fuscus fuscus)

Reptiles

- Spiny Softshell (Apalone spinifera)
- Watersnake spp. (Natrix spp.)
- Northern Watersnake (Nerodia sipedon)

== Environmental justice ==
The Proctor Creek Watershed spans six of Atlanta's neighborhood planning units, all of which have historically been African American populated. In recent years, property values have raised and have the potential to harm working-class inhabitants. Increased implementation of green infrastructure has drawn media attention to the historical districts in west Atlanta, advertising it to middle and upper-class homeowners.

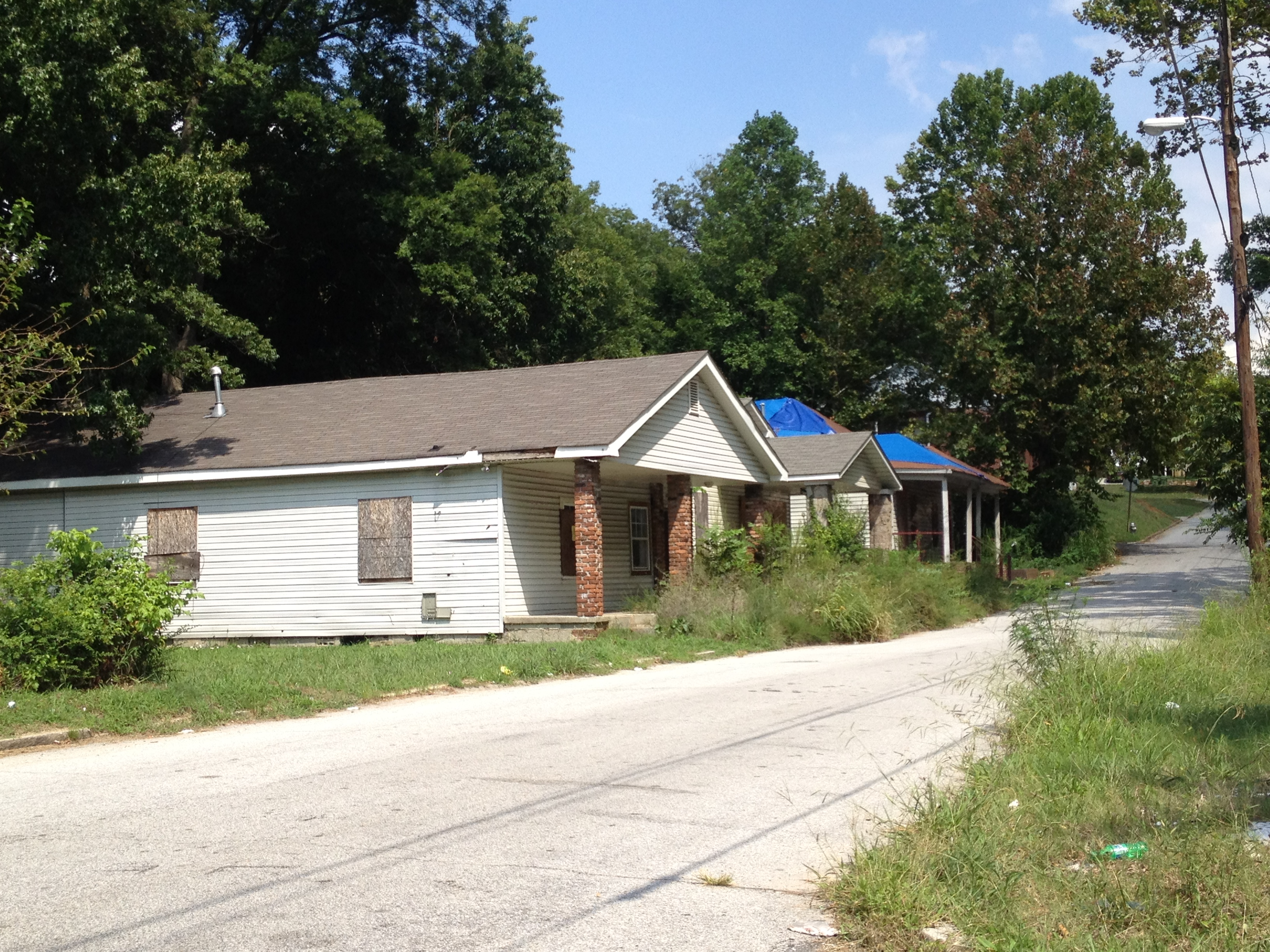
An abandoned house in English Avenue, Atlanta, GA

=== "Creating an Urban Village" ===
From the 1990s to the early 2000s, Atlanta was funded by the Empowerment Zone program to augment the social and economic standing of many poor cities, many of which were located near the Proctor Creek watershed. This funding, of over $200 million, went toward a project called the "Creating an Urban Village" Empowerment Zone project, and was faced with some scrutiny and backlash from a portion of the cities' residents.

English Avenue and Vine City are two neighborhoods in the North Avenue sub-basin and were a part of the "Creating an Urban Village" project. Both neighborhoods have had an increasing number of African American residents, especially since the 1970s.

After this project face cynicism, the West Atlanta Watershed Alliance was formed to promote environmental justice of the Proctor Creek watershed. This nonprofit was established in 1995 and continues running today. When the United States Army Corps of Engineers and the United States Fish and Wildlife Service were conducting research on the watershed, the West Atlanta Watershed Alliance sought the help of interns, from the Student Conservation Association, and volunteers, from the nearby neighborhoods, to engage with citizens more directly.

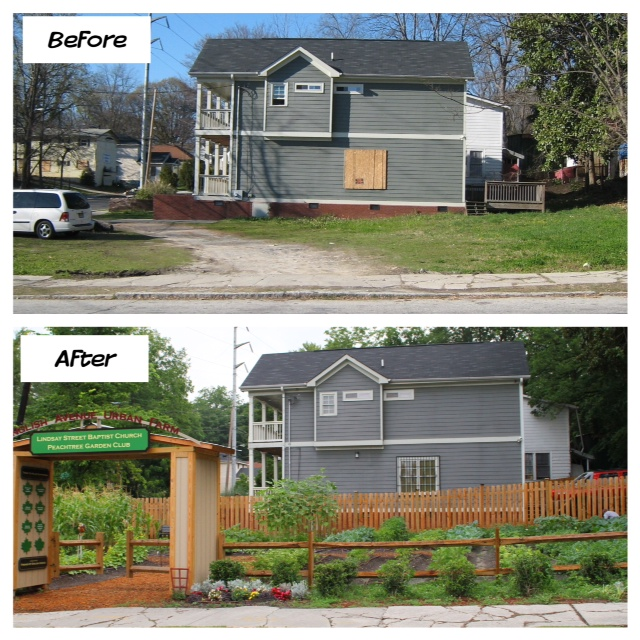
English Avenue Community Garden

=== "Parks with a Purpose" ===
Due to the historical issues with wastewater and storm runoff, Atlanta employed a green-infrastructure organization, Park Pride, in 2010, to build parks in the Vine City area. This pursuit was called "Parks with a Purpose". Later The Conservation Fund was employed to purchase six vacant properties in English Avenue neighborhoods for the project. These parks are now known as Lindsay Street Park, Vine City Park, and Kathryn Johnston Memorial Park. Rodney Cook, Sr. Park was also established around the same time, but it is not considered a "Parks with a Purpose" project.

People were generally in agreeance with Park Pride's changes since that organization made a point to include the community; however, The Conservation Fund had more trouble with this and instead cooperated with Resourceful Communities, an environmental advocacy agency, to engage with the community for them.

Resourceful Communities acknowledged the challenges gentrification posed on the English Avenue and Vine City residents, allowing for development of the parks that prioritized socioecological improvement. Afterward, in 2015, Lindsay Street Park was completed with stream bed features to direct storm and wastewater into the soil rather than the Proctor Creek watershed. A bioswale, a rain garden, and several pollinator gardens were also added to this park to improve the quality of plant life. Soon after, in 2016, Vine City Park and Kathryn Johnston Memorial Park were completed with many of the same features.

== Influential organizations ==
Flag of the United States Fish and Wildlife Service

=== Federal Government Organizations ===
- Centers for Disease Control and Prevention
- Department of Transportation
- Environmental Protection Agency
- Federal Emergency Management Agency
- General Services Administration
- Health and Human Services
- Housing and Urban Development
- National Oceanic and Atmospheric Administration
- United States Army Corps of Engineers
- United States Department of Agriculture
- United States Department of the Interior
- United States Environmental Protection Agency
- United States Fish and Wildlife Service
- United States Forest Service
- United States Geological Survey

Seal of the United States Geological Survey

=== Non-Government Organizations ===
- The Trust for Public Land
- The Conservation Fund
- Groundwork USA
- American Rivers

=== Non-Federal Organizations ===
- Arthur Bank Foundation
- Atlanta Beltline
- Atlanta Botanical Gardens
- Atlanta Food Bank
- City of Atlanta Department of Parks and Recreation
- City of Atlanta Department of Watershed Management
- City of Atlanta Public Works
- Clark Atlanta University Logo
  Clark Atlanta University
- Chick-fil-A
- The Coca-Cola Company
- Delta Air Lines
- Eco-Action
- Emerald Corridor
- Emory Hercules Program
- Emory University
- Fulton County Public Health Department
- The Georgia Aquarium
- Georgia Environmental Protection Division
- Georgia Institute of Technology
- Georgia Power
- Georgia State University
- HELPinc.org
- Invest Atlanta
- Kaiser Permanente
- The Mercedes-Benz Stadium
- The National Monuments Foundation
- Park Pride
- Proctor Creek Stewardship Council
- Resourceful Communities
- Spelman College and Morehouse College
- Student Conservation Association
- Turner Foundation
- UPS
- Urban Waters Federal Partnership
- West Atlanta Watershed Alliance

== See also ==
- Chattahoochee River
- English Avenue and Vine City
- Lindsay Street Park
- Kathryn Johnston Memorial Park
- Rodney Cook, Sr. Park
- West Atlanta Watershed Alliance
- Atlanta
- List of Georgia Rivers
- Georgia (U.S. State)
