= Westside, Atlanta =

Multiple neighborhoods of Atlanta, Georgia, US

Westside in Atlanta may mean:

- West Midtown an arts, design, and residential district on the west side of the city, or
- the entire west side of Atlanta (southwest Atlanta, northwest Atlanta)
- Historic Westside Village, a mixed-use development in Vine City, northwest Atlanta

"Westside" can also mean the entire west side of Atlanta. The name West Midtown is used by the neighbors' association in Home Park, the largest constituent neighborhood, and by the West Midtown Business Association.

"Westside" referring to West Midtown only, is used by Not for Tourists and Westside Provisions, a privately run commercial district.

However, "Westside" meaning other areas in the west side of Atlanta, or the entire west side (southwest Atlanta, northwest Atlanta), is used by the BeltLine and by Invest Atlanta, the City of Atlanta Economic Development Authority.

Both "West Midtown" and "Westside" are used by Creative Loafing and Westside Atlanta Guide & Maps.
