= English Avenue and Vine City =

Neighborhoods of Atlanta, Georgia, United States

- Neighborhoods of Atlanta
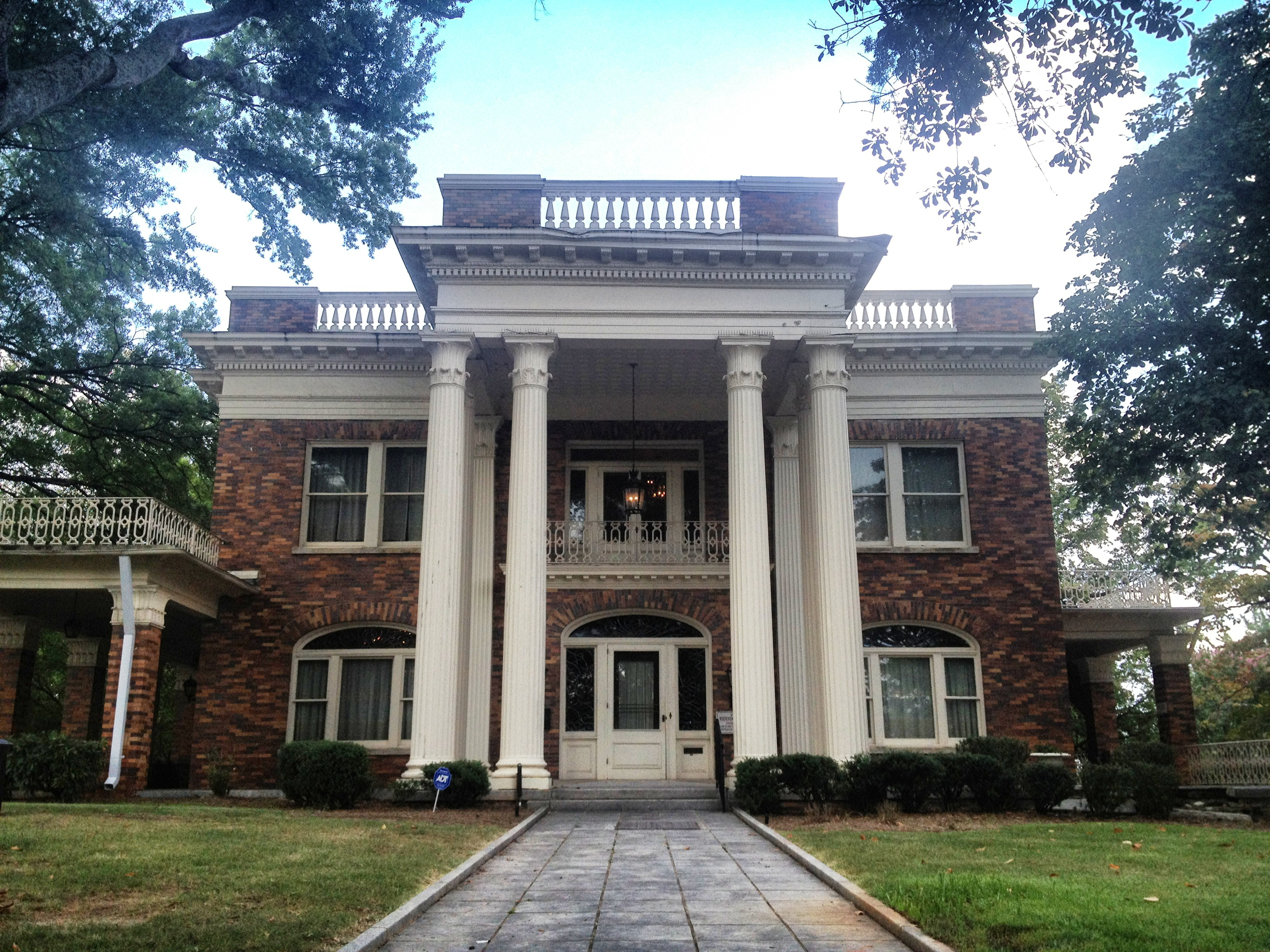
- Herndon Home, built by African-American insurance magnate Alonzo Herndon

- Location in Central Atlanta
- Coordinates: 33.763441°N 84.410341°W
- Country: United States
- State: Georgia
- County: Fulton

Government
  - Type: Neighborhoods of Atlanta
- Time zone: UTC-5 (Eastern (EST))
  - Summer (DST): UTC-4 (EDT)

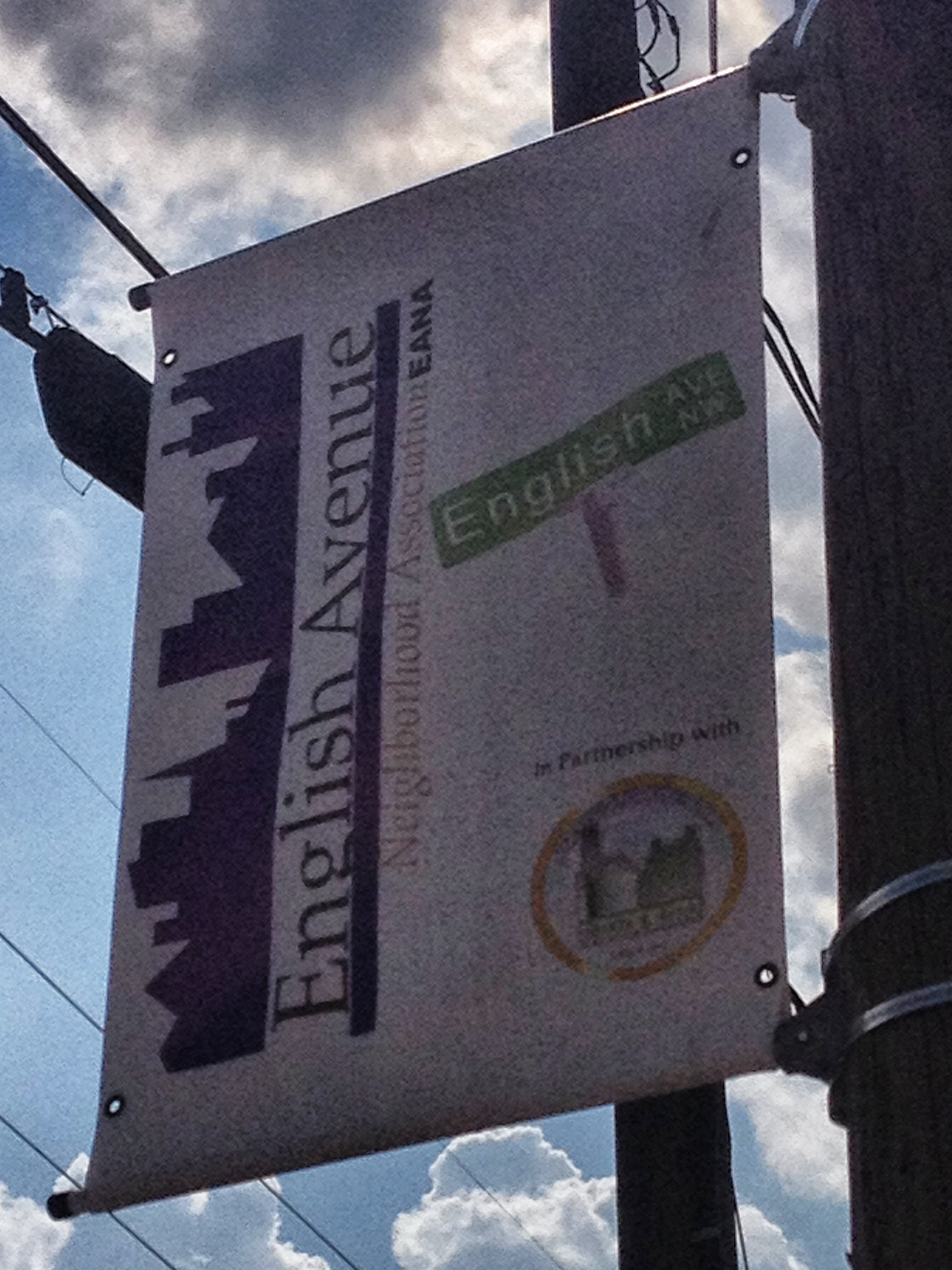
English Avenue banner on street light pole

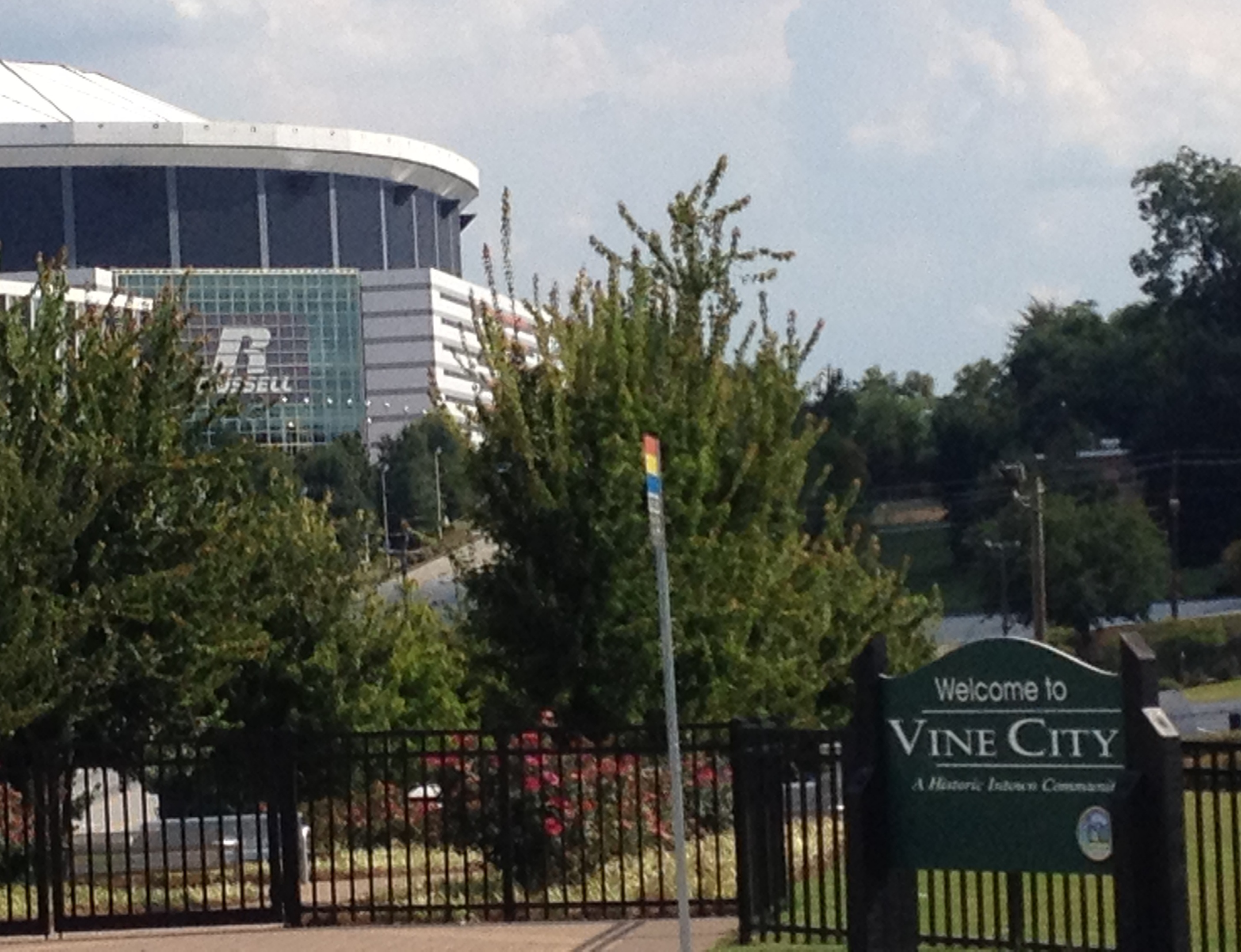
Vine City sign with Georgia Dome in background

English Avenue and Vine City are two adjacent and closely linked neighborhoods of Atlanta, Georgia. Together the neighborhoods make up neighborhood planning unit L. The two neighborhoods are frequently cited together in reference to shared problems and to shared redevelopment schemes and revitalization plans.

English Avenue is bounded by the railroad line and the Marietta Street Artery neighborhood to the northeast, Northside Drive, the North Avenue railyards and downtown Atlanta to the east, Joseph E. Lowery Blvd. (formerly Ashby St.) and the Bankhead neighborhood to the west, and Joseph E. Boone Blvd. (called Simpson St. until 2008) and Vine City to the south. Its population was 3,309 in 2010.

Vine City is bounded by Joseph E. Boone Blvd. (Simpson) and the English Avenue neighborhood to the north, Northside Drive and downtown Atlanta to the east, Martin Luther King Jr. Dr. (formerly Hunter St.) and the Atlanta University Center to the south, and Joseph E. Lowery Blvd. (Ashby) and the Washington Park neighborhood to the west. Its population was 2,785 in 2010.

A section of the area, "The Bluff," is infamous throughout Metro Atlanta as a high crime area, but in late 2011, English Avenue and Vine City were the focus of multiple improvement plans, including a network of parks and trails, increased police presence, and "rebranding" for a more positive image. Efforts included the Rodney Cook Sr. Park, completed June 29, 2021.

== History ==
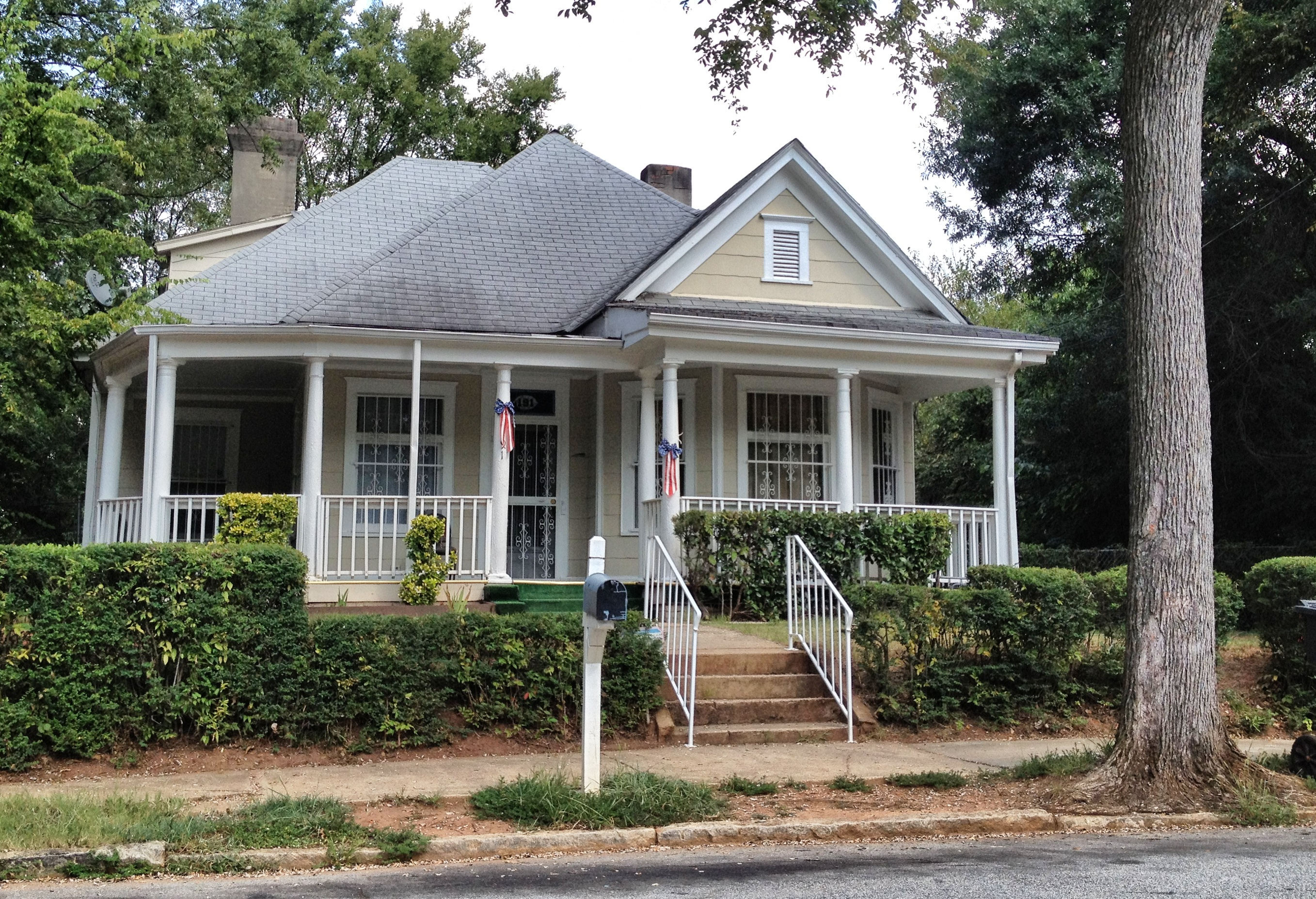
Houses in proposed Sunset Avenue Historic District

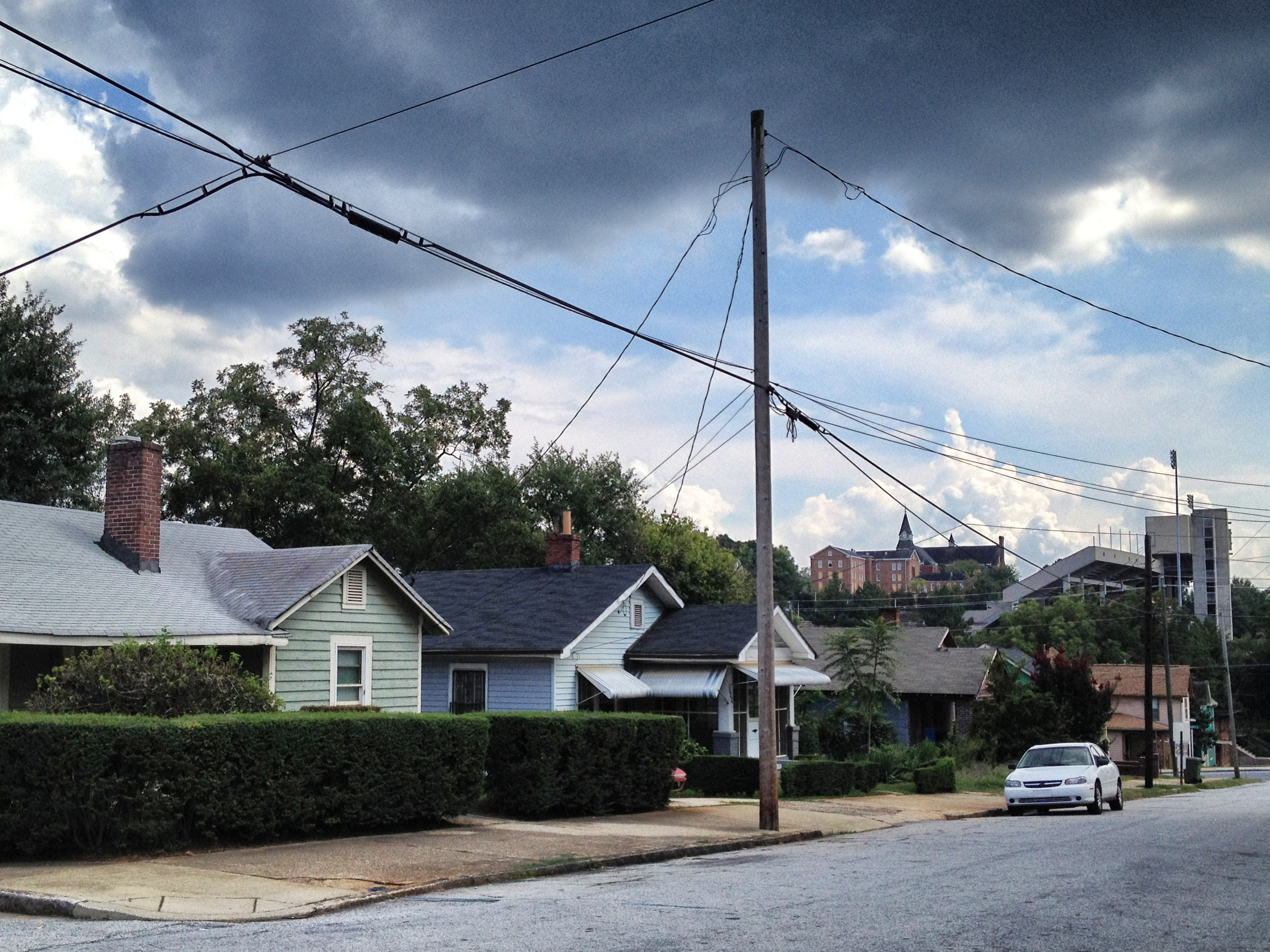
Houses in proposed Sunset Avenue Historic District - in background, Herndon Stadium and Fountain Hall at Morris Brown College

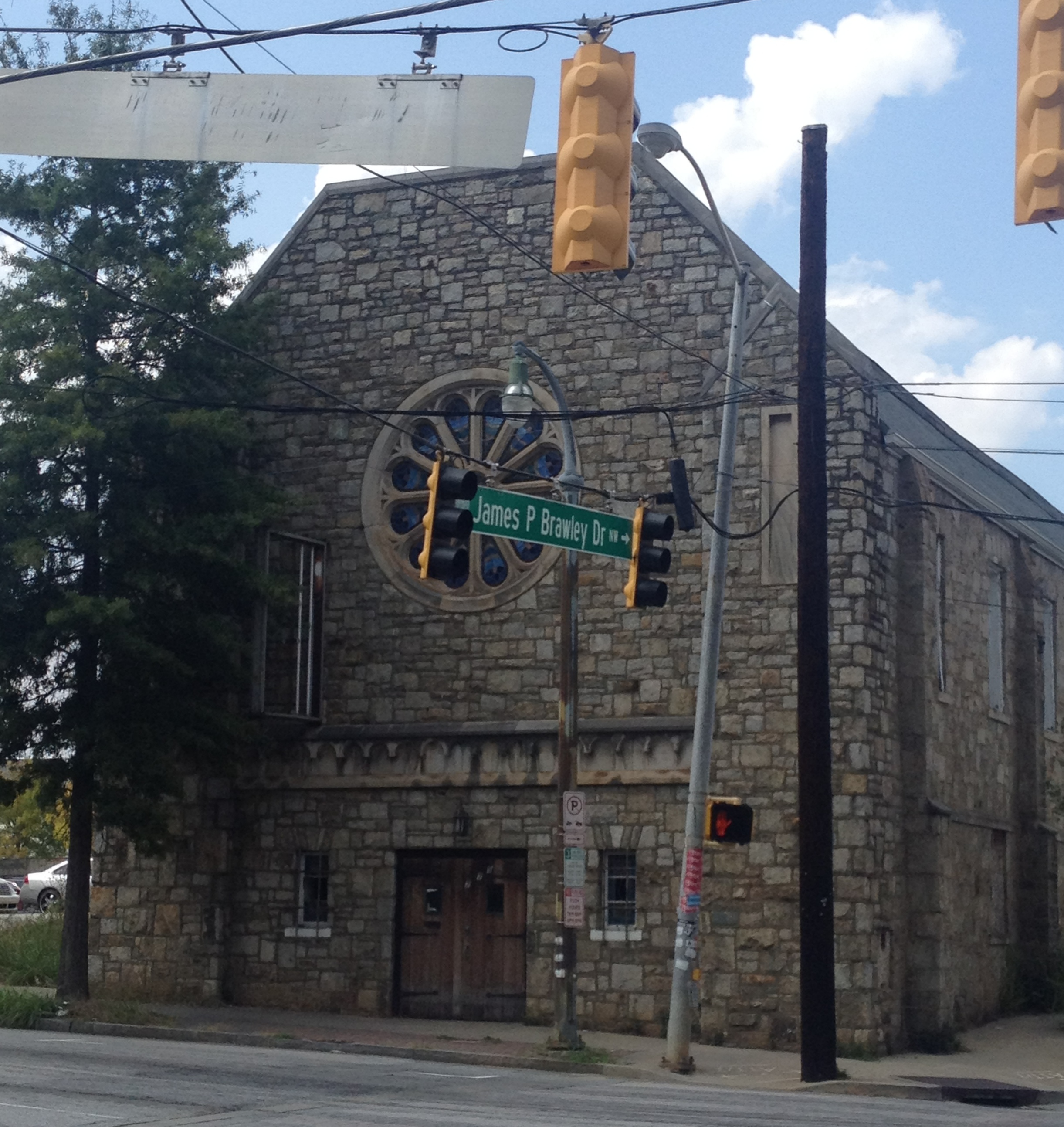
Former church on King Dr., Vine City

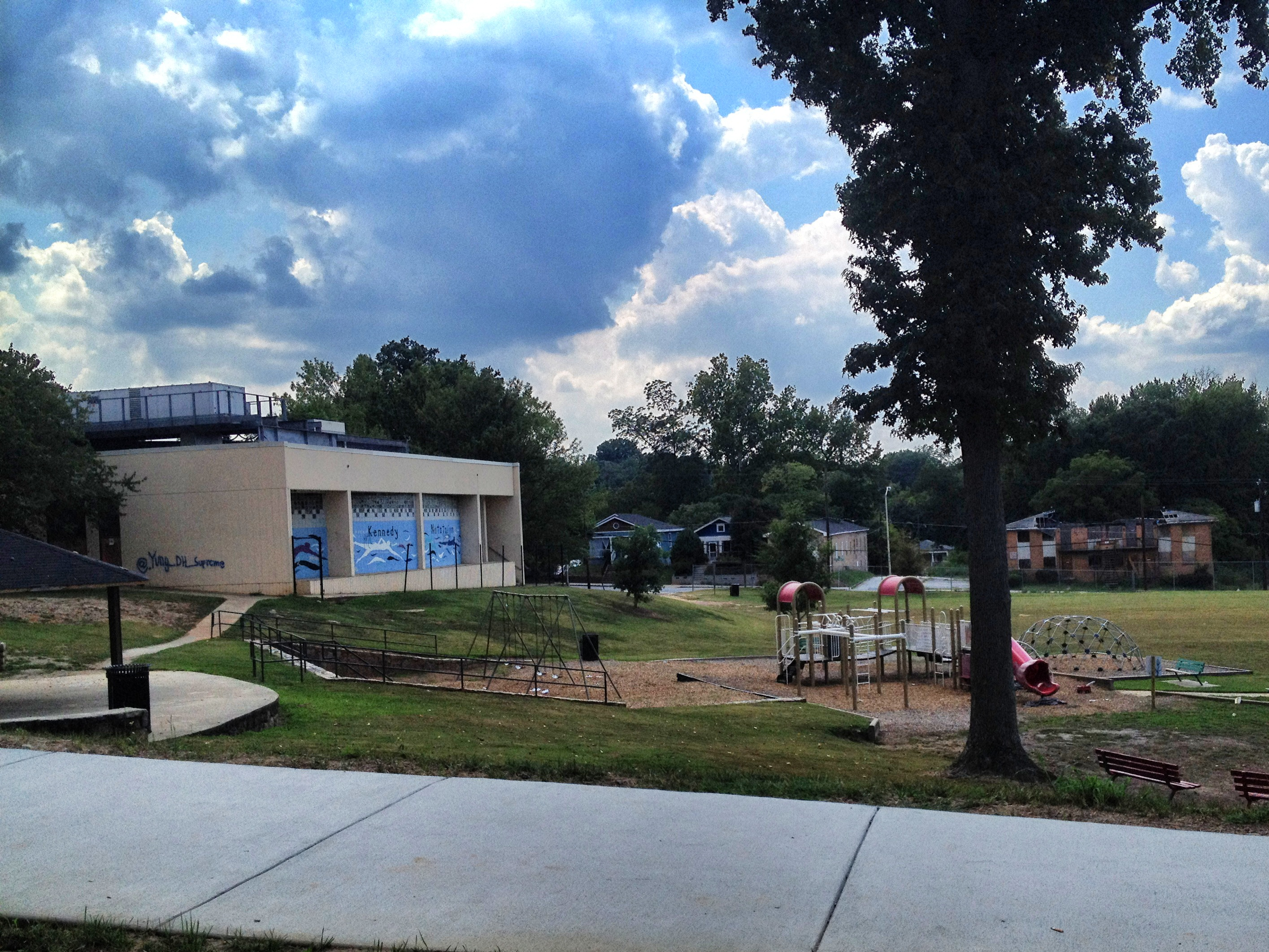
John F. Kennedy Park, Vine City

=== Development ===
What is now the English Avenue neighborhood was purchased in 1891 by son of Atlanta mayor James W. English, James W. English Jr., a hot-headed man who earned income by subletting convict labor. It was created as a white working-class neighborhood. Simpson Road was located along a residential race barrier with whites to the north and blacks to the south. Today's English Avenue was known at different times as Bellwood and as Western Heights. In 1910 the Western Heights school (later renamed Kingbery after a principal of the school, then renamed English Avenue Elementary School) was built at the northeast corner of English Ave. and Pelham St.

Overcrowding in the neighborhood's school is documented as a serious issue from at least 1910 through 1946 (photo), notwithstanding multiple expansions of the facility.

The area south of Simpson Road — today's Vine City — was settled at the end of the 1800s by large land owners, and a predominantly African-American residential area was established, though there were also white subdivisions, schools, and churches. A mix of social classes were present. In 1910 Alonzo F. Herndon, founder of the Atlanta Life Insurance Company, built his home at 587 University Place, now listed on the National Register and open to visitors.

=== Racial tension and transition ===
The Great Atlanta fire of 1917 contributed to the already great need for housing for African Americans and by the 1920s-1940s, despite violence and bombings trying to prevent it, black residents started to move north across Simpson Road.

In 1941, the Eagan Homes and Herndon Homes public housing projects opened and as a result, the black population in the area increased. On Hunter Street (now Martin Luther King Jr. Drive), white business owners once lived behind their stores, but in the 1940s, black owners started taking over these businesses. In 1947 Paschal's Restaurant, an Atlanta soul food landmark and meeting place for civil rights leaders, opened in its original location on West Hunter Street. In 1951, the English Avenue Elementary School's designation was changed from white to black in response to most whites having moved out of the area.

=== Heyday and Civil Rights ===
During the mid-20th century, the area was a middle-class African-American neighborhood. Commercial areas included English Avenue; Simpson Street/Road, in its heyday in the 1950s and 1960s; and Bankhead Highway, which was part of the US Highway system, and was in its splendor in the 1960s. Dr. Martin Luther King Jr. moved to the area in 1967, and his widow Coretta Scott King continued to live here until she moved to a Peachtree Road luxury condominium purchased for her by Oprah Winfrey in 2004.

In 1960, the English Avenue elementary school was dynamited, likely in retaliation for civil rights demonstrations by Black activists. Mayor William B. Hartsfield condemned the dynamiting as the work of those from outside Atlanta, "the outhouse set". The area experienced notable pro- and anti-Black Power riots in 1966 and 1967.

=== Decline and crime ===
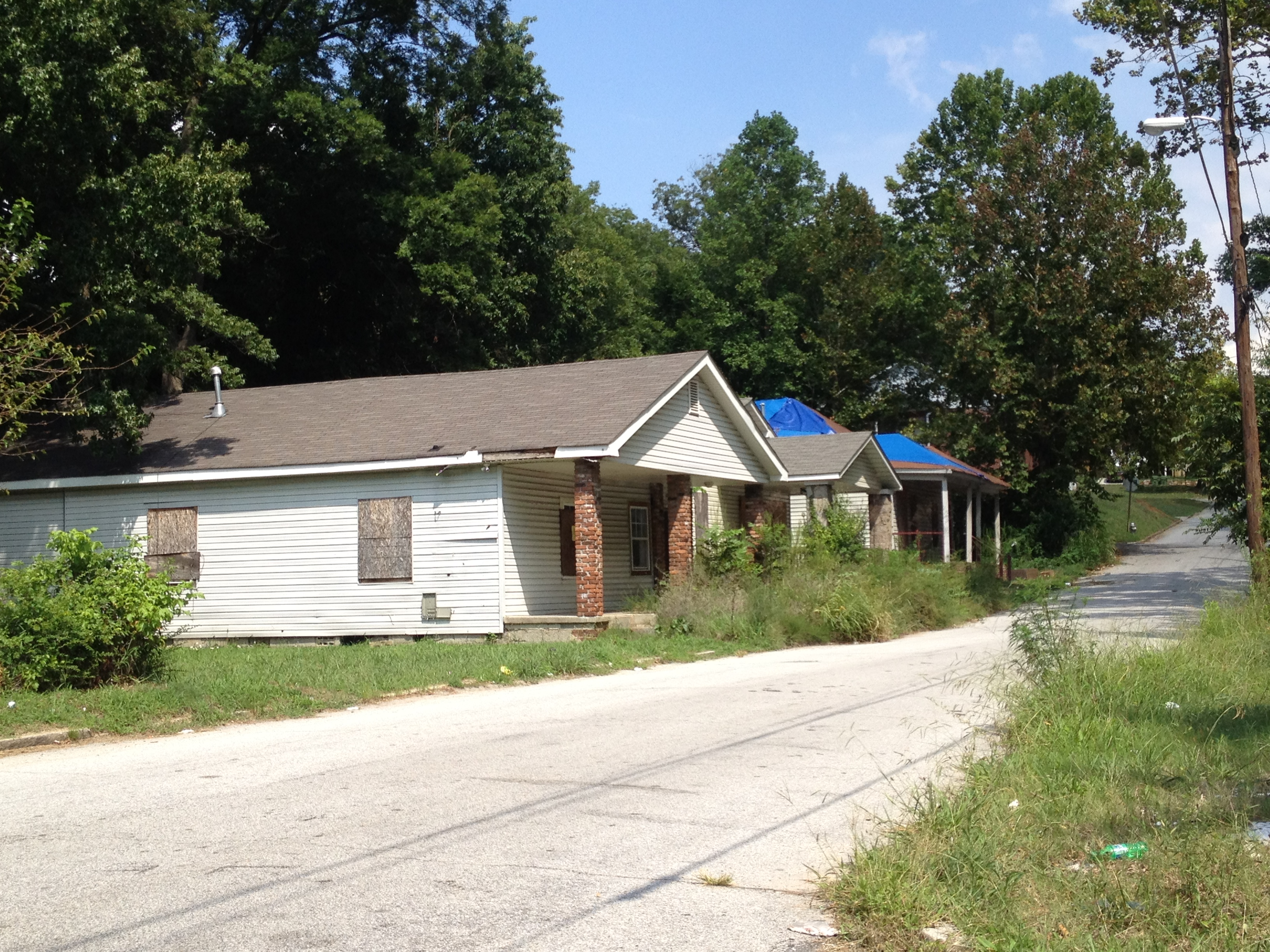
Abandoned houses, Proctor at Oliver streets, English Avenue

Suburbanization started draining the area's vitality starting in the 1970s. Over the following decades, it attracted buyers and sellers of heroin, and deteriorated into a corner of poverty in the city, characterized by large numbers of abandoned, boarded-up houses.

In 1995 the English Avenue Elementary School closed.

In 2006, a "no-knock raid" in search of a drug dealer, burst into the home of Kathryn Johnston. Ms. Johnston, in her 80s, opened fire on the officers and wounded three and was killed by return fire from the officers. The incident resulted in much anger in the neighborhood and in close scrutiny of police use of "no-knock warrants" in drug raids.

The 2008 tornado caused major damage in areas of Vine City (photos).

The 2010s foreclosure crisis hit the neighborhoods hard. In April 2012, Creative Loafing reported that "on some streets more houses are boarded up than are lived in". Occupy Atlanta protested the Vine City foreclosure of Mrs. Pamela Flores by Bank of America.

The desperate state of the area was described by reporter Thomas Wheatley in Creative Loafing in September 2012 as:

"boarded-up homes built among the trees along the narrow streets,…people loitering in the middle of vacant lots, casting hollow stares at passing motorists, and…young men hanging out on street corners, hollering at passers-by and then to lookouts down the street"

== Revitalization ==
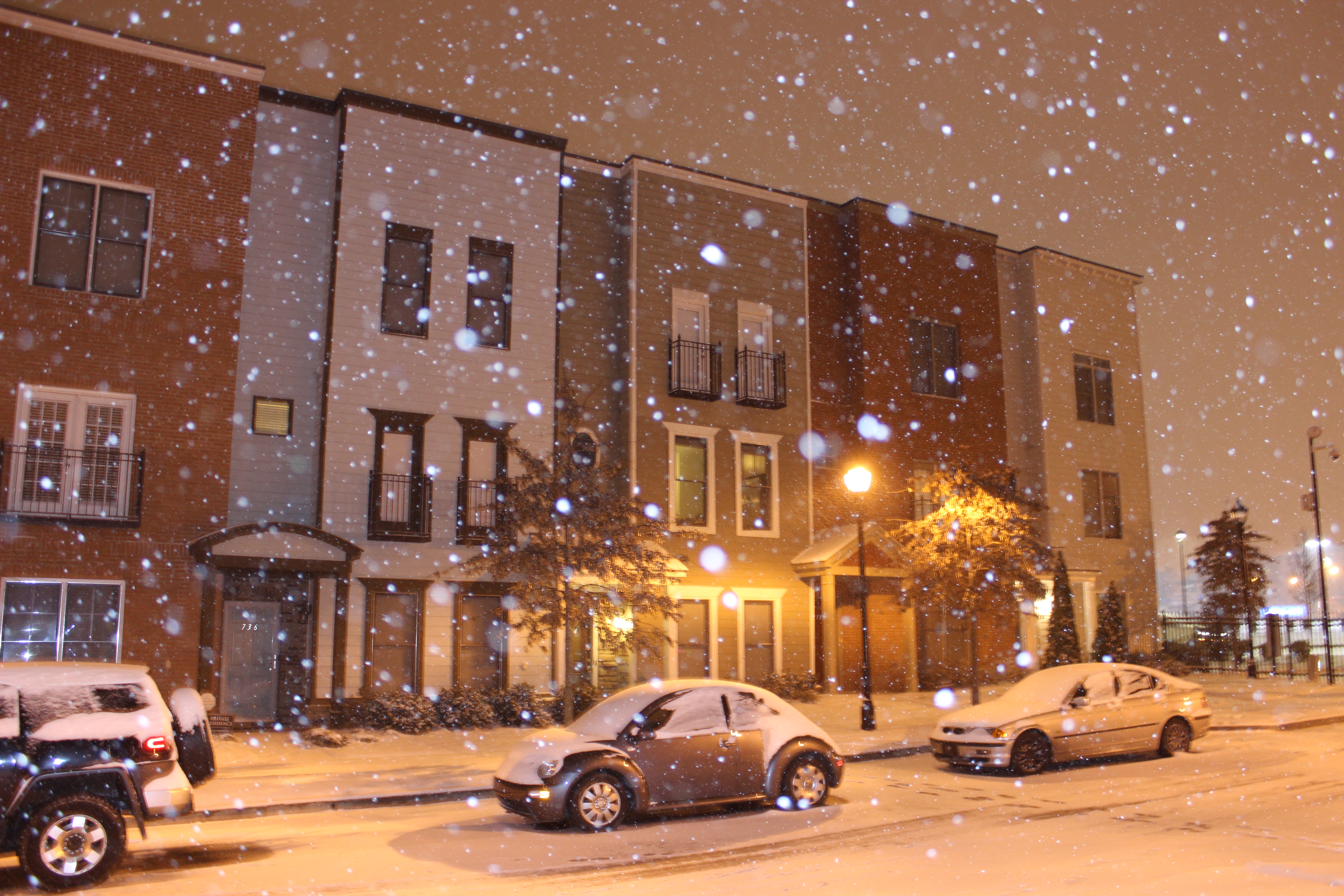
Recent revitalization efforts in the Vine City neighborhood include the Westside Commons town home complex, photographed here during the 2014 snowstorm.

=== 1990s: Failed "empowerment zone" ===
In November 1994, the Atlanta Empowerment Zone was established, a 10-year, $250 million federal program to revitalize Atlanta's 34 poorest neighborhoods including the Bluff. Scathing reports from both the U.S. Department of Housing and Urban Development and the Georgia Department of Community Affairs revealed corruption, waste, bureaucratic incompetence, and interference by mayor Bill Campbell.

=== Replacement of public housing projects ===
As part of the Atlanta Housing Authority's systematic replacement of public housing projects by mixed-income communities (MIC), Eagan Homes was demolished and the Magnolia Park MIC replaced it. Herndon Homes was demolished in 2011.

=== Historic Westside Village and Walmart ===
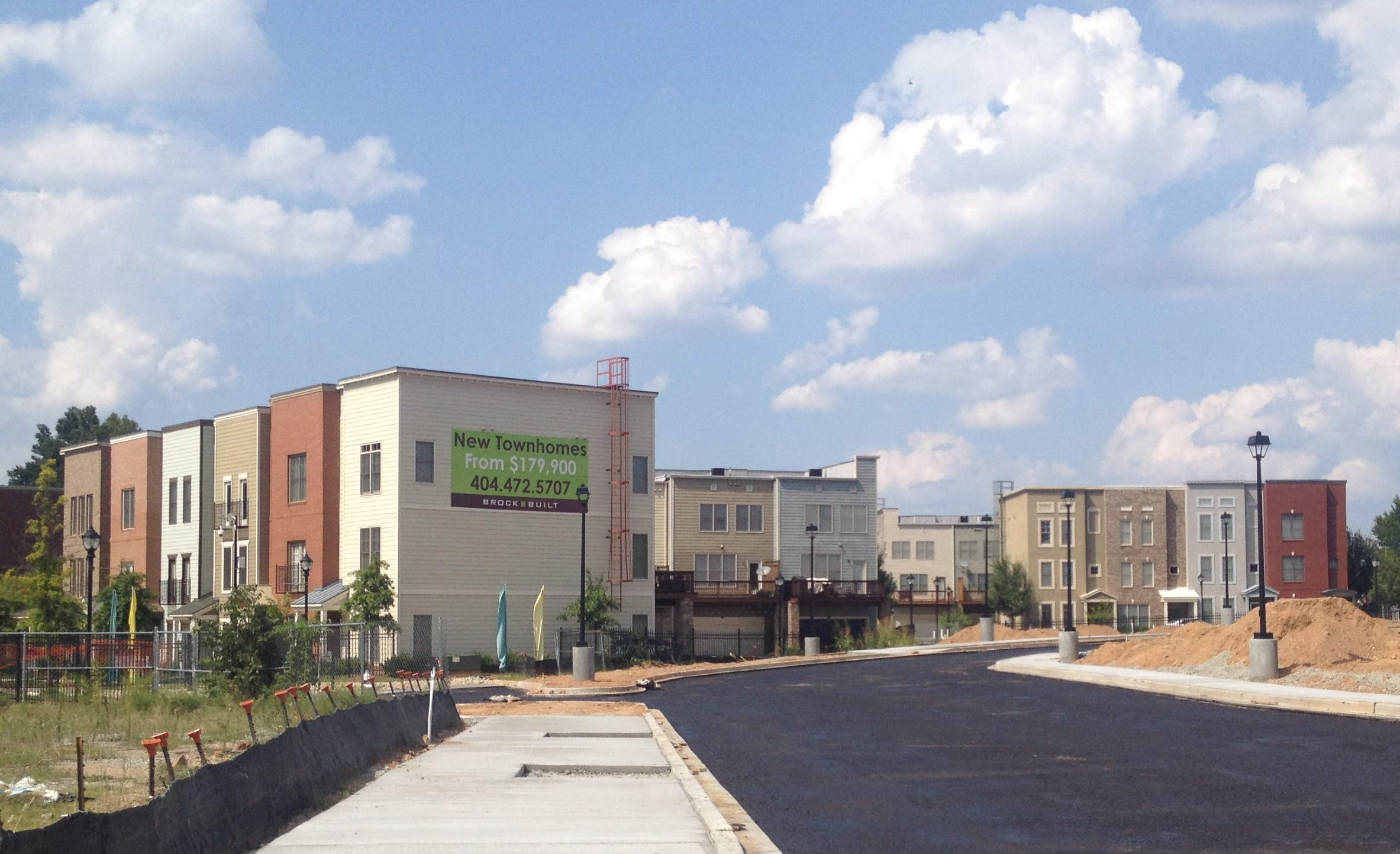
New townhomes at Westside Village, August 2012

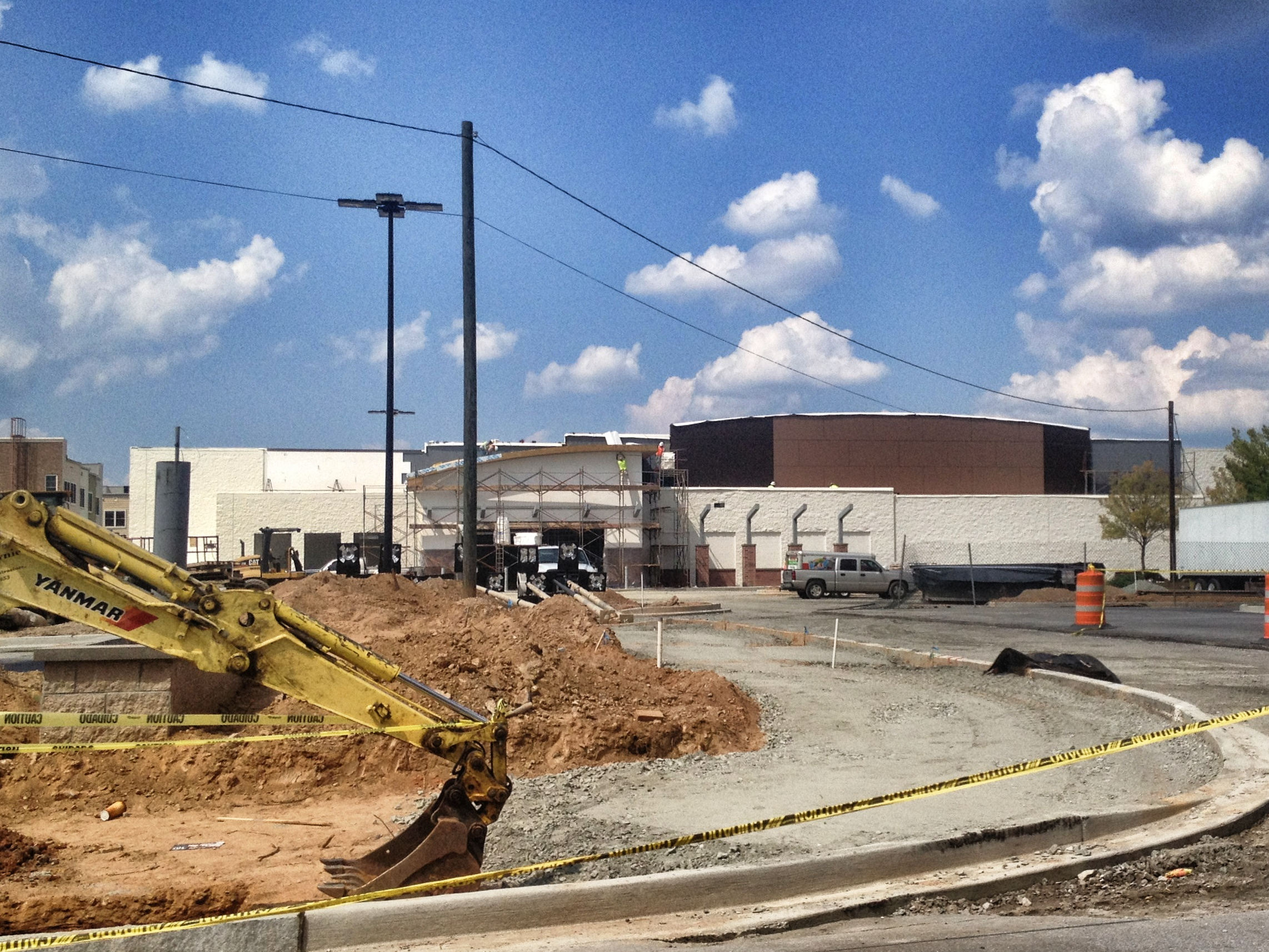
A Walmart under construction at Westside Village, August 2012

In 1999, the Atlanta Housing Authority first announced plans for the "Historic Westside Village", a $130 million commercial, residential and retail project at the area's southern end near Martin Luther King Jr. Dr. at Ashby St. A Publix supermarket opened in May 2002 but the overall project stalled by 2003 as further anchor tenants did not materialize. This, along with disappointing sales, caused the Publix - the only full-sized supermarket for miles around - to close in December 2009. Creative Loafing called the project the most notorious "municipal boondoggle...to have tarred Atlanta" during mayor Bill Campbell's era; the project "fell victim to...cronyism, bureaucratic incompetence and a flagrant disregard for federal lending guidelines". In December 2010 things looked up as the Atlanta Development Authority announced plans for Wal-Mart to open a store on the site, which Mayor Kasim Reed called "an end to the food desert in the area". In January 2013 the Wal-Mart opened for business.

=== Black-white coalition ===
The Christian Science Monitor reported that by 2008, businessman John Gordon and Rev. Anthony Motley, a 20-year resident of The Bluff, "Atlanta's roughest 'hood", had "formed a black-white coalition seeking angel investors" and brought together "local businesses, neighboring Georgia Tech, and church leaders to inspire not just city and private investment, but also to light a spark of hope among law-abiding residents – many of them older people fearful of the streets outside their front doors. Their unusual friendship" had "helped inspire two massive clean-up efforts, a small but significant drop in crime, and glimmers of fresh paint and clean-swept front walks."

=== Rodney Cook Sr. Park ===
Cook Park is under construction by a partnership consisting of the City of Atlanta's Department of Watershed Management, The Trust for Public Land of Georgia, and the National Monuments Foundation. The park will consist of a system of storm water management including a retention pond similar to the one in nearby Historic Old Fourth Ward Park, walking trails and amenities including a terraced amphitheater and splash pad and statues and monuments honoring a number of prominent Atlantans and Civil Rights leaders, including Martin Luther King Jr. and Booker T. Washington.

The site, located along the south side of Joseph E. Boone Boulevard, has been vacant for many years, after the city purchased several homes there that perpetually fell victim to severe flooding caused by historic mismanagement in the Proctor Creek watershed. In December 2011 Park Pride, a greenspace advocacy group, proposed a network of greenspaces and parks that—through the incorporation of green infrastructure—would help mitigate the recurring flooding from stormwater runoff that plagued the neighborhoods of Vine City and English Avenue for years. In 2015, the City began cleaning the site, and the Trust For Public Land joined the partnership to plan, raise funds, and construct the park above and around the stormwater management solutions. The National Monuments Foundation and Rodney Cook will fund and construct "sculptures of civil rights leaders, an urban farm, and an 80-foot "peace column."

The design mimics Mims Park, now demolished, which was once a prominent city park in Vine City named after Livingston Mims, who was mayor of Atlanta from 1901 to 1903. It was designed by Frederick Law Olmsted's sons, who also designed Piedmont Park in Midtown.

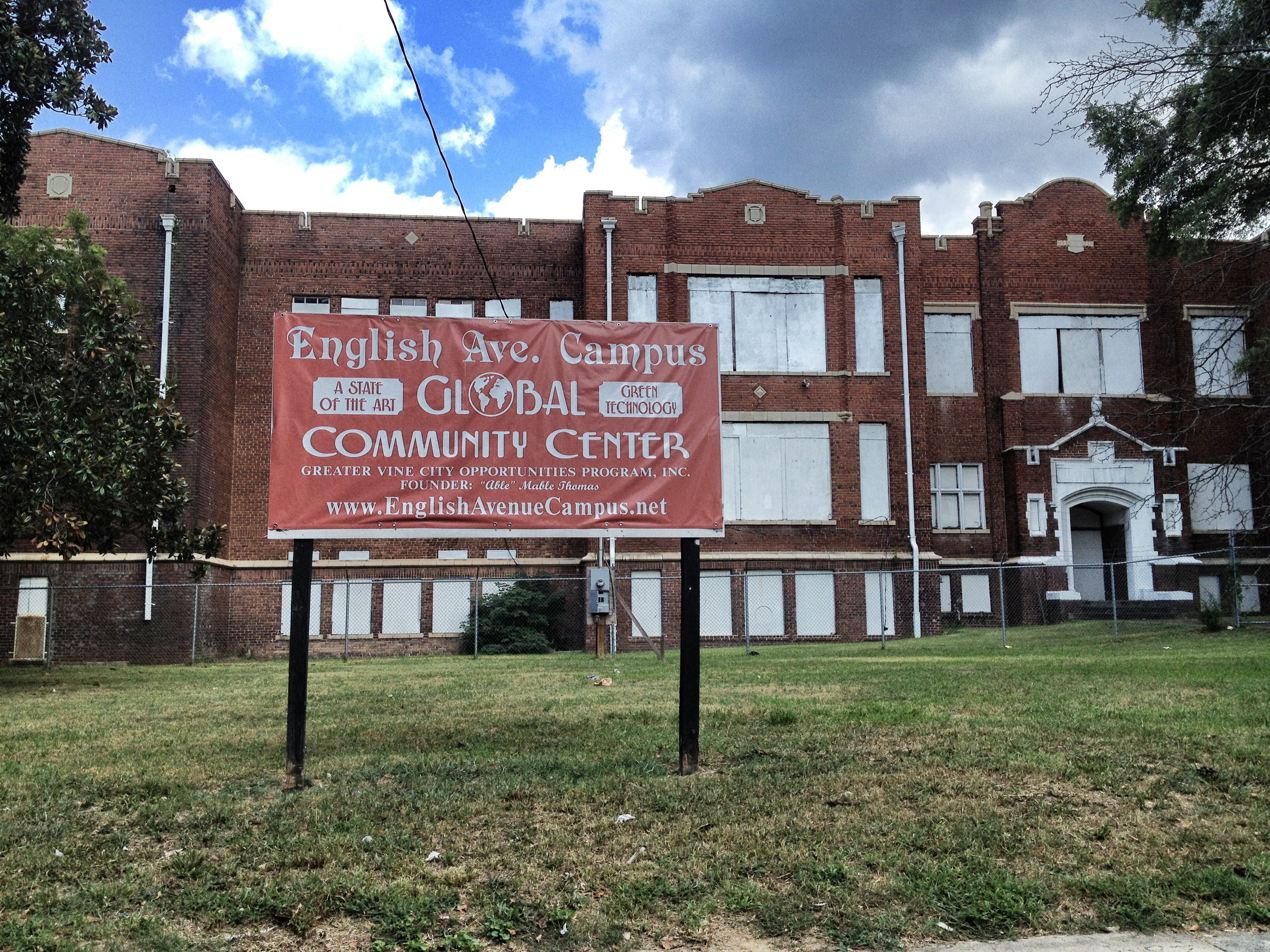
English Avenue Elementary School, site of a proposed "green technology global community center"

In 2017, it was announced that construction will commence, however the park will be named Rodney Cook Sr. Park and it is hoped to stimulate revitalization. Along with this park, Kathryn Johnston Memorial Park, named in honor of former neighborhood resident Kathryn Johnston, was also built in the neighborhood, being officially opened in 2019.

=== Other efforts since 2010 ===
In May 2010, the non-profit Greater Vine City Opportunities Program, founded and directed by "Able" Mable Thomas bought the English Avenue Elementary School with the intention to convert it into a "state of the art green technology global community center".

In March 2011, NPU L voted in favor of a Sunset Avenue Historic District from Joseph E. Boone Blvd. southward to Magnolia Street.

In December 2011, the nonprofit Friends of English Avenue arranged for a married couple, both police officers, to live rent-free in a neighborhood house. "Able" Mable Thomas and others expressed the need for a "rebranding" of the area similar to the one which rebranded crime and prostitution-infested Stewart Avenue in Southwest Atlanta as Metropolitan Parkway.

Other transformative efforts continued in 2014. A new Urban Perform gym opened on Joseph E. Boone Blvd designed to empower residents to make healthy lifestyle changes. The gym also hosts a local farmer's market on Saturdays which offers fresh, organic, produce from local community gardens. One of these gardens is the Historic Westside Gardens, which hopes to expand through a cooperative effort with the National Monument Foundation into Mims Park.

The Westside Works, a non-profit and jobs training center, opened in 2014 at the site of former E.R. Carter School at 80 Joseph E. Lowery Blvd. NW. Their mission is to serve the underserved by teaching new skills crucial to the modern workforce. In Summer 2014 they graduated their first class of trainees.

=== 2010s investments ===
There are multiple efforts underway to encourage and promote home ownership in Vine City and English Avenue. Invest Atlanta has a trust fund which provides up to 10% of the downpayment for a first time homeowner, up to $15,000. Home Atlanta 4.0 provides up to 5% of the house cost, but waives the first-time buyer requirement.

Invest Atlanta and the Arthur M. Blank Foundation partnered to provide $30 million in seed money for innovative and transformative non-profits to help revitalize the two neighborhoods.

In 2018, Friendship Baptist church held talks with developers regarding Downtown West, a new construction development adjacent to the new home of the Atlanta Falcons, Mercedes-Benz Stadium.

== Culture ==
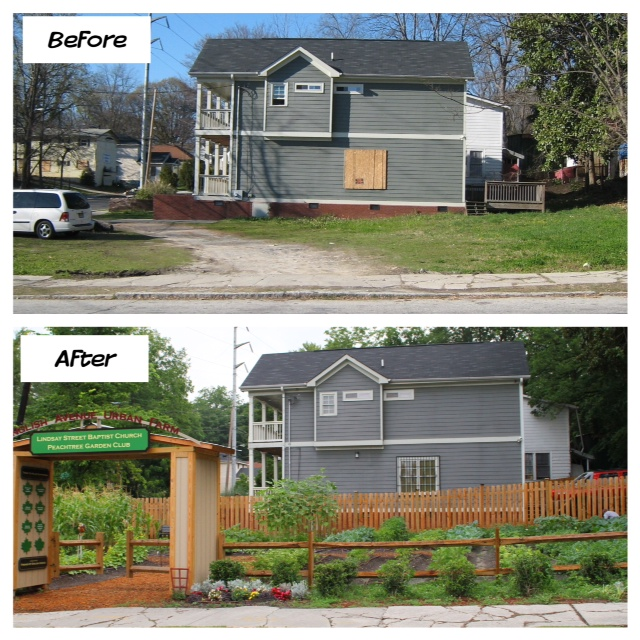
Revitalization in English Avenue continues with work on multiple community gardens. A before & after picture of the English Avenue Community Farm.

=== Festivals ===
In 2012, an annual festival was established, the Historic Westside Village Festival. The event includes educational seminars, vendors, a Kids Zone, and a concert stage, with proceeds going to local charities and services. In 2013 the festival took place on September 21.

The annual English Avenue Festival of Lights is directed by the Historic Westside Cultural Arts Council. The Festival is an exhibition of the community and encourages community members to be a light in their neighborhood. There is a Children's pavilion, free food and drinks, and an exhibition of local non-profits.

== Churches ==
The area is home to a large concentration of churches, including:

- Amazing Grace Church
- Antioch Baptist Church North
- Apostolic Faith Church
- Atlanta Reformed Presbyterian Church
- Atlanta Revival Center
- Beulah Baptist Church
- Body of Christ Temple
- Cosmopolitan AME Church
- Faith, Hope and Deliverance Temple
- Faithful Friends Baptist Church
- Grace Midtown Church
- Greater Bethany Baptist Church
- Greater Deliverance Baptist Church
- Greater New Hope Baptist Church
- Greater Springfield Baptist Church
- Greater Vine City Baptist Church
- Heavenly Jerusalem Missionary Baptist Church
- Higher Ground Empowerment Center
- Lilly of the Valley Baptist Church
- Lindsay Street Baptist Church
- Live Life Tabernacle of Praise
- New Jerusalem Baptist Church
- Pilgrim Missionary Baptist Church
- Redeemer Community Church
- Simpson Street Church of Christ
- Sims Avenue Baptist Church
- St. James Baptist Church
- St. Mark's Baptist Church

== Points of Interest ==
- Rodney Cook Sr. Park (site, to be developed)
- John F. Kennedy Park
- Kathryn Johnston Memorial Park
- Lindsay Street Park
- Westside Village shopping center
- Herndon Home museum
- King Plow Arts Center
- Morris Brown College
- Architecture of the Sunset Avenue Historic District (proposed)
- Vine City (MARTA station)
- across Northside Drive: Mercedes-Benz Stadium, Georgia World Congress Center
- Proctor Creek watershed

== "The Bluff" ==
The Bluff is a district within the area that is infamous throughout metro Atlanta for the availability of drugs, heroin in particular. "Bluff" originated as an acronym for "Better Leave, U Fucking Fool".

The borders of The Bluff are defined differently by different sources. For example, the Atlanta Journal-Constitution and Creative Loafing both defined The Bluff as including all of English Avenue and Vine City. However, a more recent and in-depth December 2011 series of reports by 11 Alive TV news, referred to The Bluff as a "section of English Avenue". The English Avenue/Vine City area has some of the highest poverty and crime rates in the city, with the Carter St. area surrounding the Vine City MARTA station ranking in 2010 as the #1 most dangerous neighborhood in Atlanta and #5 in the United States.

== Public transportation ==
The area is served by the MARTA rail Blue Line and Green Line at the Vine City and Ashby stations. Bus lines serving the neighborhood are the 3 along Martin Luther King Jr. Drive, the 51 along Joseph E. Boone Blvd., and the 26 along Cameron M. Alexander Blvd. (known as Kennedy St. until 2010), English Avenue and Donald L. Hollowell Pkwy.

== Famous residents ==
- Rev. Dr. Martin Luther King Jr. and Coretta Scott King
- Comedienne Ms. Pat
- State Senator Julian Bond and family resided on Sunset Avenue. The home is still owned and occupied by the family.
- Mary Phagan, victim of notorious 1913 murder at National Pencil Company.
- 2012 Republican presidential candidate Herman Cain spent his early youth here, attending English Avenue School and the age of 10 joining Rev. Cameron M. Alexander's Baptist mega-church.
- Singer Gladys Knight and two of the Pips attended English Avenue Elementary School
- Judge Marvin S. Arrington Sr.
- Mayor Maynard H. Jackson Jr.
- Comedian Bruce Bruce grew up in the Bluff
- Gangster and Star of the 2012 movie Snow on tha Bluff, Curtis Snow
- Rapper Ralo grew up in The Bluff
- Dorothy Bolden, President of the National Domestic Workers Union.
