= Lindsay Street Park =

Public park in Atlanta, Georgia, USA

- Location within Atlanta Location within Georgia Location within the United States
- Location: 550 Oliver Street NW; Atlanta, Georgia
- Coordinates: 33°46′10″N 84°24′57″W
- Area: 1.5 acres
- Opened: October 21, 2015

Lindsay Street Park is a public park in the English Avenue neighborhood of Atlanta, Georgia. Opened in 2015, it is the first park to be opened in English Avenue

== History ==
Prior to 2015, the English Avenue neighborhood in Atlanta did not have a public park. Construction on Lindsay Street Park began on April 4, 2014, when associates of the Blank Family of Businesses, including Arthur Blank, Thomas Dimitroff, Rich McKay and Mike Smith broke ground on the new park. Blank had helped fund the construction of the park through the Arthur Blank Family Foundation, with other donations coming from Invest Atlanta, U-Haul, and Park Pride, among other groups. The area the park was built on had previously been the site of six abandoned lots. Park Pride had worked for three years to convert the property to a greenspace as part of their "Parks with Purpose" program, in conjunction with The Conservation Fund. The project cost approximately $750,000. On October 21, 2015, Atlanta Mayor Kasim Reed officially opened the park. This park was the first in a series of parks constructed in the area in conjunction with The Conservation Fund that have included Kathryn Johnston Memorial Park and an expansion to the nearby Vine City Park. The park is part of a plan to help alleviate urban blight in the area and help in water management. A small stream that runs through the park flows into nearby Proctor Creek.

== Bibliography ==
- "Mayor Reed Celebrates the Opening of Lindsay Street Park in the English Ave. Neighborhood". Atlanta Daily World. Real Times. October 22, 2015.
- Johnson, Kent D. (April 4, 2014). "Blank Family of Businesses lay groundwork for Lindsay Street Park". The Atlanta Journal-Constitution. Cox Enterprises.
- Kahn, Michael (October 20, 2015). "In Shadow of Falcons Stadium, New Park is a Key Addition". Curbed Atlanta. Vox Media. Archived from the original on August 20, 2016.
- Kahn, Michael (June 22, 2016). "Park Officials Say New Greenspace will be Catalyst for Westside Changes". Curbed Atlanta. Vox Media. Archived from the original on June 23, 2016.
- Kinch, Dionne (October 22, 2015). "New park opens in English Ave. neighborhood". The Atlanta Journal-Constitution. Cox Enterprises.
- Leslie, Katie (October 21, 2015a). "Blocks from 'The Bluff,' English Avenue gets its first public park". The Atlanta Journal-Constitution. Cox Enterprises.
- Leslie, Katie (October 21, 2015b). "Reed: English Avenue park sign of more to come in Atlanta's Westside". The Atlanta Journal-Constitution. Cox Enterprises.
- Miller, Pamela (August 22, 2018). "Groundbreaking dedicates new park in English Avenue neighborhood". The Atlanta Journal-Constitution. Cox Enterprises.
