= John F. Kennedy Park =

American public park

- Location within Atlanta Location within Georgia Location within the United States
- Location: 225 Chestnut Street; Atlanta, Georgia
- Coordinates: 33°45′43″N 84°24′43″W
- Area: 4.8 acres

John F. Kennedy Park is a public park in the Vine City neighborhood of Atlanta, Georgia. The park, named after former United States president John F. Kennedy, was reopened in 2019 following an extensive renovation.

== History ==
Prior to Super Bowl LIII, which was held at the nearby Mercedes-Benz Stadium in Atlanta, the park received a $2.4 million renovation, which included the installation of a new playground and an artificial turf field. Groundbreaking occurred on August 22, 2018. On January 31, 2019, Atlanta Mayor Keisha Lance Bottoms, NFL commissioner Roger Goodell, and Atlanta Falcons owner Arthur Blank officially reopened the park. The renovation was funded by contributions from the National Football League Foundation and the Arthur Blank Family Foundation.

== See also ==
- List of memorials to John F. Kennedy

== Bibliography ==
- Lewis, Kaitlyn (August 22, 2018). "City Announces $2M Park Renovations Ahead Of Super Bowl". WABE. Atlanta Public Schools.
- Saporta, Maria (January 31, 2019). "Arthur Blank on new Westside park: 'It is a great moment for our city'". Atlanta Business Chronicle. American City Business Journals.
- Trubey, J. Scott (January 31, 2019). "NFL and partners renovate Westside Park as part of Super Bowl project". The Atlanta Journal-Constitution. Cox Enterprises.
- Tucker, Tim (August 22, 2018). "Atlanta's Super Bowl unveils legacy project". The Atlanta Journal-Constitution. Cox Enterprises.
