= Sunset Avenue Historic District =

Sunset Avenue is a proposed 35-acre historic district in the Vine City neighborhood just west of Downtown Atlanta. The proposed district contains representative wood houses from the late 19th-mid 20th century, in the Folk Victorian, Queen Anne, Craftsman, Minimal Traditional, Ranch, and American Small House^{[usurped]} styles. Most are smaller homes built for the working class, though there are a few larger homes.
