= English Avenue School =

- U.S. National Register of Historic Places
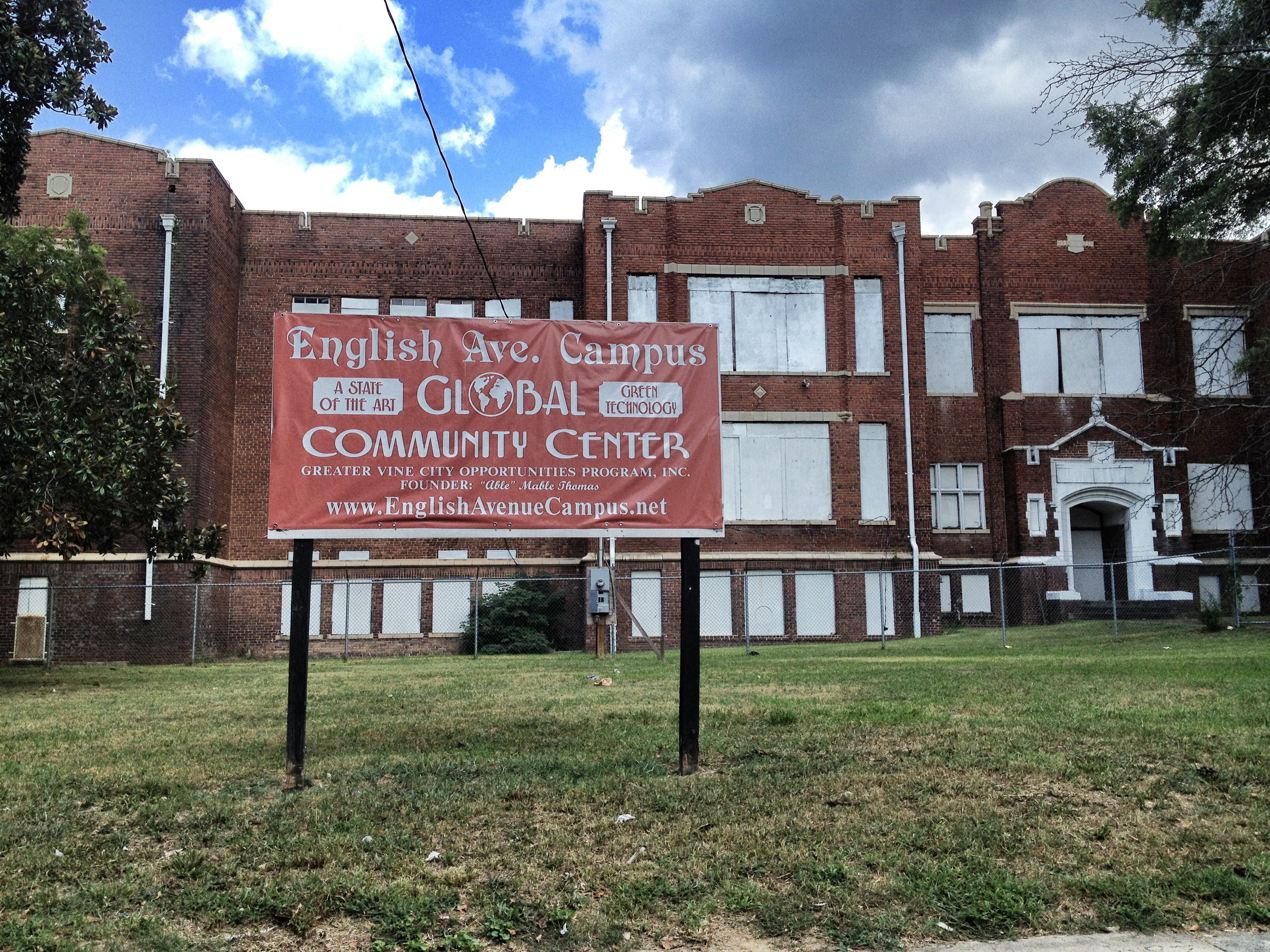
- The building in 2012

- Location within Atlanta Location within Georgia Location within the United States
- Location: 627 English Avenue NW; Atlanta, Georgia, United States
- Coordinates: 33°46′18″N 84°24′46″W
- Built: 1910
- NRHP reference No.: 100005101
- Added to NRHP: March 23, 2020

The English Avenue School is a historic school building in Atlanta, Georgia, United States. Located in the city's English Avenue neighborhood, the school was built in 1910 and operated until 1995. It was added to the National Register of Historic Places in 2020.

== History ==
The school was built in 1910 to serve the Atlanta neighborhood of Western Heights, a predecessor of today's English Avenue neighborhood. Additional construction occurred between 1911 and 1930 as the school's enrollment continued to grow. As part of the system of school segregation in the United States, the school was initially only open for White Americans, but in 1950, due to changes in the neighborhoods demographics, it was changed to an African American school. On December 12, 1960, the school was the site of a bombing after the school's auditorium had been used for a prayer meeting prior to an anti-segregation protest the previous day. The event has been called "one of the worst racially motivated bombings in the city of Atlanta." The school closed in 1995.

Since the school's closing, the building has remained unoccupied. In 2010, the building was bought by the Greater Vine City Opportunities Program, under the leadership of Mable Thomas, with the intention of converting the building into a community center. On March 23, 2020, the building was property was placed on the National Register of Historic Places.

== Notable alumni ==
- Herman Cain
- Gladys Knight
- Mable Thomas

== See also ==
- National Register of Historic Places listings in Fulton County, Georgia
