= Historic Mims Park =

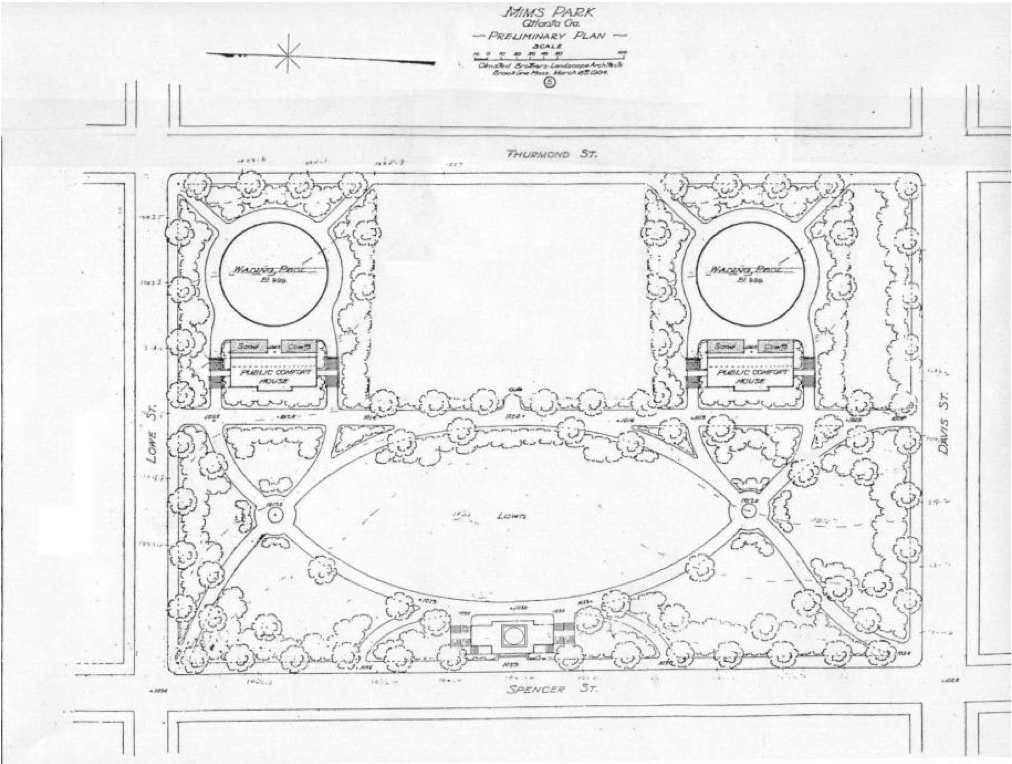
Original Olmsted Plan of Mims Park

Historic Mims Park was created on Mayor Livingston Mims's initiative and named in his honor. Designed in the late 19th century by the Olmsted brothers, it featured meadows, trees, walking paths, fountains and a playground.

There have been proposals to recreate Mims Park on the former grounds of the historic Wachendorff Nursery property. Plans call for replicating the original Olmsted layout and adding new features such as a wading pool, a civic square with a reconstructed Carnegie Library building, and an organic farm and greenhouses to be managed by the residents of the neighborhood. A Peace Column topped by a statue of Chief Tomochichi has also been designed for the new park. An elevator ride to the top of the 80 ft column would provide a panoramic view of the nearby Sunset Avenue Historic District.

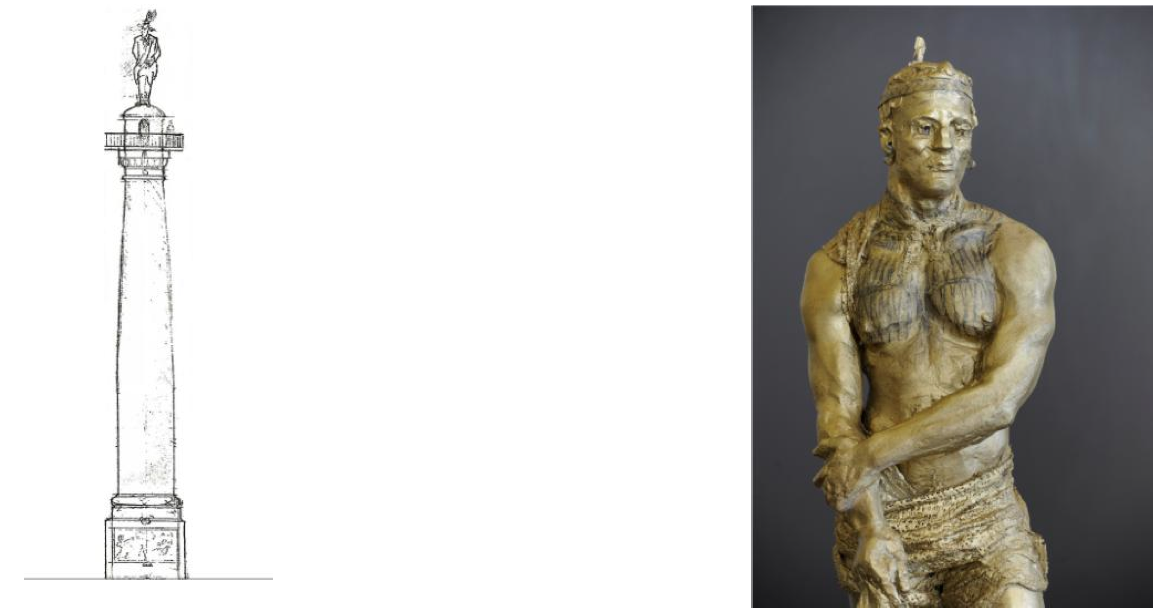
Chief Tomochichi and proposed monument for Historic Mims Park

Many of Atlanta's civil rights leaders lived and were educated within view of Historic Mims Park. In recognition of this, the new park would include statues of Joseph E. Boone, Dorothy Bolden, Andrew Young, Coretta Scott King, Booker T. Washington, W.E.B. DuBois, Livingston Mims, Maynard Jackson, Ralph Abernathy, Julian Bond, Rodney Mims Cook, Sr., and Martin Luther King Jr., the last of which would look south towards his alma mater, Morehouse College.

This proposal has received the support of the Mayor of Atlanta and the City Council.
