= Historic Westside Village =

Mixed-use development in Atlanta, Georgia, US

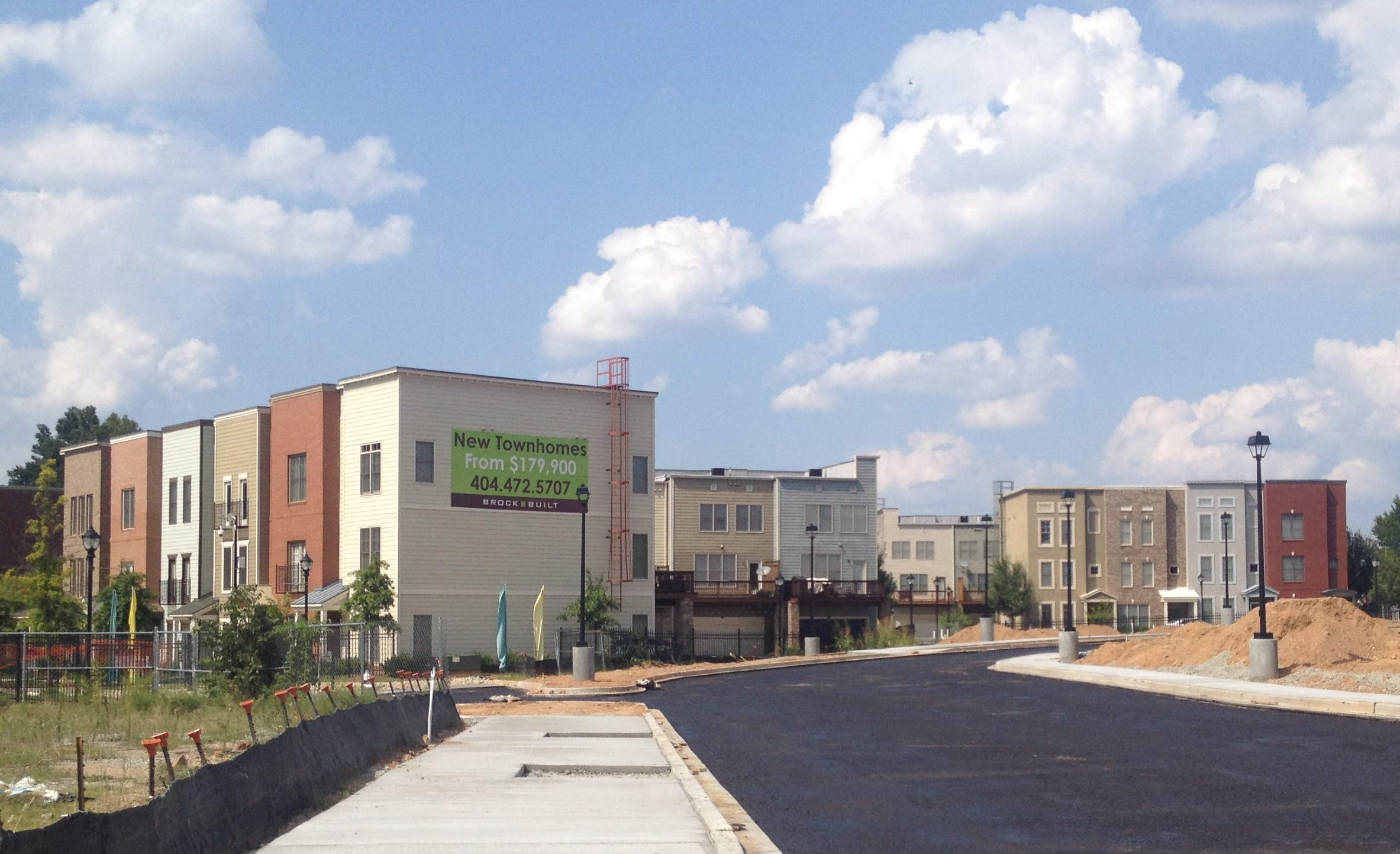
New townhomes at Westside Village, August 2012

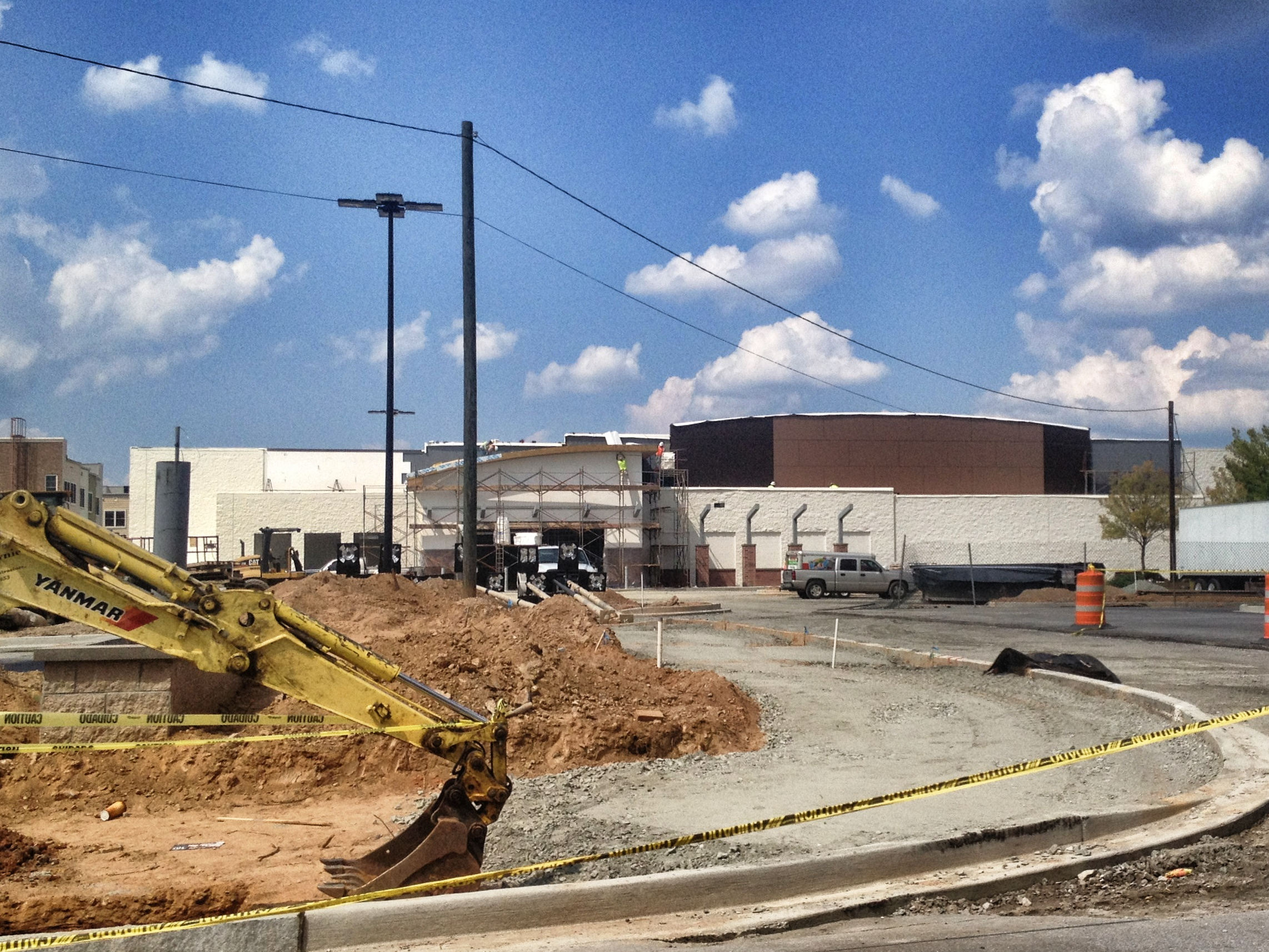
A Walmart under construction at Westside Village, August 2012

"'Historic Westside Village"' is a mixed-use development in Vine City, Atlanta including a Walmart, other retail stores, and apartment complexes.

== History ==
In 1999, the Atlanta Housing Authority first announced plans for the "Historic Westside Village", a $130 million commercial, residential and retail project at the area's southern end near Martin Luther King, Jr. Dr. at Ashby St.

=== Publix failure ===
A Publix supermarket opened in May 2002 but the overall project stalled by 2003 as further anchor tenants did not materialize. This, along with disappointing sales, caused the Publix - the only full-sized supermarket for miles around - to close in December 2009. Creative Loafing called the project the most notorious "municipal boondoggle...to have tarred Atlanta" during mayor Bill Campbell's era; the project "fell victim to...cronyism, bureaucratic incompetence and a flagrant disregard for federal lending guidelines".

=== Walmart success ===
In December 2010 things looked up as the Atlanta Development Authority announced plans for Wal-Mart to open a store on the site, which Mayor Kasim Reed called "an end to the food desert in the area". In January 2013 the Wal-Mart opened for business.

=== "Legends of Historic Westside Village" ===
In 2015, "Legends of Historic Westside Village" exhibit was unveiled, "a series of photos of community activists, businesses, and educational institutions that impacted the neighborhood" including Mayor Maynard Holbrook Jackson, former Judge Austin Thomas Walden, Dr. Hamilton E. Holmes, Sr., and educator W.E.B. Du Bois.
