= West Atlanta Watershed Alliance Outdoor Activity Center =

Park in Atlanta, Georgia, United States

Coordinates: 33.7292°N 84.4340°W

West Atlanta Watershed Alliance: Outdoor Activity Center (OAC)
- Interactive map of West Atlanta Watershed Alliance: Outdoor Activity Center (OAC)
- Type: Environmental education center, Nature preserve
- Location: 1442 Richland Road; Atlanta, Georgia, USA
- Area: 26 acres (11 ha)
- Designer: John Ripley Forbes
- Operator: West Atlanta Watershed Alliance
- Website: www.wawa-online.org

The West Atlanta Watershed Alliance Outdoor Activity Center (OAC) is a public environmental education, nature preserve, and outdoor activity facility in Atlanta, Georgia. The center is 26 acres (0.11 km^{2}) and focuses on educational outreach and outdoor activities in an urban setting.

As of 2014, the OAC contains approximately 2 miles (3.2 km) of trails, a ropes course, a nature-themed playground, a tree house classroom, a 650-US-gallon (2,500 L; 540 imp gal) freshwater aquarium, and a multi-purpose building.

When the center opened in 1975 as the Bush Mountain Outdoor Activity Center, it was Atlanta's "first and only environmental education and outdoor recreation facility." Atlanta Public Schools leased 8 acres (0.032 km^{2}) to the OAC for $1 a year, and the Natural Science for Youth Foundation helped fund, organize and staff the original center. The Atlanta Bureau of Parks and Recreation later purchased the property from the school system and assumed maintenance of the parkland.

In 2007, the National Wildlife Federation referred to the OAC as "an ecological jewel."

The center is located beside the former practice lot for the Atlanta Black Crackers.

== See also ==
- John Ripley Forbes
