= Killing of Kathryn Johnston =

2006 police killing

Kathryn Johnston
- Johnston circa 2000–2006
- Born: June 26, 1914; Atlanta, Georgia, U.S.
- Died: November 21, 2006 (aged 92); Atlanta, Georgia, U.S.

Kathryn Johnston (June 26, 1914 – November 21, 2006) was an elderly woman from Atlanta, Georgia, who was killed by undercover police officers in her home on Neal Street in northwest Atlanta on November 21, 2006, where she had lived for 17 years. Three officers had entered her home in what was later described as a 'botched' drug raid. Officers cut off burglar bars and broke down her door using a no-knock warrant. Police said Johnston fired at them and they fired in response; she fired one shot out the door over the officers' heads and they fired 39 shots, five or six of which hit her. None of the officers were injured by her gunfire, but Johnston was killed by the officers. Police injuries were later attributed to friendly fire from each other's weapons.

One of the officers planted marijuana in Johnston's house after the shooting. Later investigations found that the paperwork stating that drugs were present at Johnston's house, which had been the basis for the raid, had been falsified. The officers later admitted to having lied when they submitted cocaine as evidence claiming that they had bought it at Johnston's house. Three officers were tried for manslaughter and other charges surrounding falsification, convicted, and sentenced to ten, six, and five years, respectively.

== Shooting ==
The officers, dressed in plainclothes, approached the house at about seven in the evening. Officers Jason R. Smith, Gregg Junnier, and Arthur Tesler, who were wearing bulletproof vests and carrying riot shields when they entered the home, announced themselves after opening the door but before entering the house, according to police. Johnston fired a gun after police forced open the door. It was later determined that Johnston fired one shot from an old pistol and that none of the officers were hit by that bullet. The police officers fired a total of 39 shots, five or six of which hit Johnston. Police injuries sustained in the raid were from bullets not fired from Johnston's gun. The officers were hit in the arm, thigh, and shoulder respectively; they were treated at a hospital.

Prosecutors later said that Smith handcuffed Johnston as she was dying. Johnston was pronounced dead at the scene. Prosecutors accused one of the officers of planting three bags of marijuana in the house as an attempted cover-up after no drugs were found in the house. Smith later admitted to having planted the drugs. They had been found in an unrelated case earlier that day. Prosecutors also accused Smith of calling Alex White (an informant) after the shooting and telling him to say he had bought crack cocaine at Johnston's house. According to court filings, before talking to the homicide detective, the three officers involved in the shooting got together to get their stories straight.

Johnston lived alone and had lived in that house for about 17 years. Her house was in a crime-ridden neighborhood in west Atlanta. People in the neighborhood speculated that the police had the wrong person, but police denied that they had the wrong house. Neighbors and family said that Johnston kept a "rusty revolver" for self-defense; another elderly woman in her neighborhood had recently been raped, and drug dealing was common. In the year before her death, Johnston had installed extra locks and burglar bars.

== Warrant ==
Around 2:00 AM, Officer Smith stated that while alone in the woods, he found a few small bags of marijuana and put them in his patrol car. Later, Smith conducted a search of a suspected drug dealer yet found no drugs, Smith planted the marijuana on the suspect and threatened to arrest him if he did not give them information leading to an arrest. The man later testified that he gave the police Johnston's Neal Street address and a fictitious name to ask for to purchase cocaine to avoid being arrested for the marijuana Smith planted. At 5:00 PM, police requested that their informant make a cocaine purchase at the address; however, the informant was unavailable.

As justification for the no-knock warrant, the Atlanta Police Department initially claimed that the police were searching for drug dealers after a police informant was said to have bought crack at Johnston's home. However, the informant later denied having bought drugs at her house, and suspicion about the incident sparked a federal and state investigation. In the affidavit police used to obtain a search warrant for Johnston's house, Atlanta narcotics officers alleged their informant bought drugs inside Johnston's home earlier in the day from a man named "Sam", and that the home had video surveillance equipment justifying the no-knock warrant. In an interview with Atlanta television station WAGA a few days after Johnston's shooting, the informant denied having gone to her house and said that after the shooting, police pressured him to lie and say that he had. The informant denied that he had ever been to Johnston's house. According to WSB-TV in Atlanta, Detective Junnier subsequently told the Federal Bureau of Investigation that some of the information used to obtain the search warrant on Johnston's home was false. Several experts said that even if the warrant information had been entirely legitimate, the informant's word would not have been enough to legally justify the no-knock warrant.

== Trials ==
On February 7, 2007, it was announced that the Fulton County District Attorney's office, under district attorney Paul L. Howard, Jr., would seek felony murder and burglary indictments against the three officers involved. The Rev. Markel Hutchins, acting as spokesman for Johnston's family, said her family members were "stunned and disappointed" by the announcement of the indictments because they believed it will disrupt a larger federal investigation of civil rights violations by the Atlanta Police Department.

The federal probe into the police department revealed that Atlanta police routinely lied to obtain search warrants, including often falsifying affidavits. The police sergeant in charge of the narcotics unit also pleaded guilty to charges surrounding the shooting, and another officer admitted to extortion. Tesler's attorney, William McKenney, said that planting drugs and lying to obtain search warrants is routine in the police department.

=== Pleas ===
On October 30, 2008, Tesler pleaded guilty to federal charges of conspiracy to violate the civil rights of Johnston. All three ex-officers pleaded guilty to "conspiracy to violate civil rights resulting in death." Tesler, who had been stationed at the back of Johnston's house and had not fired during the raid, testified that Smith and Junnier had planned the cover-up and that he had participated in the cover-up out of fear that the other officers would frame him if he did not. Tesler testified that the other two officers had instructed him to memorize a story: that they had witnessed a drug sale to their informant at Johnston's property. Prosecutors said Tesler had passed up earlier opportunities to tell the truth but had begun telling the truth after federal investigators told him they knew he was lying.

Smith and Junnier pleaded guilty to state charges of manslaughter, and federal civil rights charges. Smith and Junnier pleaded guilty to voluntary manslaughter and making false statements, which were state charges. Smith additionally pleaded guilty to perjury. Smith admitted that he had planted bags of marijuana in Johnston's house after the shooting.

=== Sentences ===
Tesler was convicted of making false statements and acquitted of two other charges: violating oath of a public officer and false imprisonment under color of legal process. In May 2008, Tesler was sentenced to four years and six months in prison for lying to investigators. He also received six months probation and must serve 450 hours of community service.

On February 24, 2009, U.S. District Judge Julie E. Carnes sentenced former officer Gregg Junnier to six years in prison, Jason Smith to 10 years in prison and Arthur Tesler to five years in prison. Junnier and Tesler had faced recommended 10 years in prison under sentencing guidelines, while Smith faced 12 years and seven months. According to U.S. Attorney David Nahmias, the sentences of Junnier and Smith were reduced after they provided information to assist in the prosecutions of the other ex-officers. Carnes also ordered Smith, Junnier and Tesler to reimburse Johnston's estate the cost of her burial, $8,180.

== Aftermath ==
Changes were made to the police department and to the narcotics unit following Johnston's death. The mayor also announced that APD training procedures would be reviewed and a new regulation would be instituted requiring APD officers to take drug tests.

The shooting also brought under scrutiny the use of no-knock warrants, which exist to prevent drug offenders from having time to destroy evidence. After the shooting, the state senate voted to tighten restrictions, making it more difficult to obtain the warrants. The Atlanta Police Department was also forced to tighten its warrant requirements after an investigation sparked by the shooting. The police department also said it would review its use of confidential informants after the shooting. As a result of the shooting, the police chief placed Atlanta's eight-man narcotics team on administrative leave. A civilian review board was created in the aftermath of the shooting in the context of the public outrage that resulted. Eventually, the narcotics team was increased from eight to thirty officers, and all former members of the team were replaced.

Allegations of widespread misconduct in the Atlanta Police Department came under state and federal investigation after Johnston's shooting. The US attorney announced that prosecutors would investigate a "culture of misconduct" within the APD, including common practices of making false statements to get warrants and submitting falsified documentation in drug cases. The DeKalb County district attorney announced on the day of Johnston's shooting that she would also ask for an investigation into 12 other fatal shootings by police since January 2006.

The officers involved in the shooting testified that they had been under pressure to meet performance requirements of the APD, which led them to lie and falsify evidence, and that they had been inadequately trained. Police Chief Pennington denied the existence of quotas in the APD, but acknowledged the existence of "performance measures because if we don't have them, the officers would come in every day with nothing on their sheets."

Other arrests by the discredited officers which led to convictions have come under review. The District Attorney for Fulton County announced that it was reviewing at least 100 cases in which the ex-officers had been involved earlier, as well as other cases with different officers who may have used similar tactics. In June 2007, one man who was serving prison time on drug charges based on testimony from Junnier and Smith was the first of these cases to be released from prison.

Johnston's shooting, along with several others, brought police use of deadly force under increased scrutiny. A week after the shooting, over 200 people held a rally in Johnston's neighborhood to demand answers to questions surrounding the shooting. The shooting was highlighted by civil rights activists as an example of the police department's poor treatment of people living in low-income neighborhoods.

In reference to this case, Gregory Jones, the Special Agent in Charge of the Atlanta FBI, said, "Few crimes are as reprehensible as those committed by police officers who violate the very laws they have sworn to uphold."

In 2019, the Kathryn Johnston Memorial Park, named in honor of Johnston, was opened in English Avenue, near where Johnston had lived.

Johnston's death inspired John Gordon, a businessman from the Buckhead community of Atlanta to found a nonprofit organization,Friends of English Avenue, which is dedicated to improve the quality of life of the residents through green-space development, public safety initiatives and mentoring programs in service of Johnston's legacy. As of 2019, both crime and the gap between the community and the police has been reduced with the city's initiative to have Atlanta Police officers live rent-free in homes in the area.

=== Lawsuits ===
One year after the shooting, Johnston's family sued the city of Atlanta, the police chief, and five other officers, accusing them of false imprisonment, civil rights violations, racketeering, and other violations. The suit claims that officers used unreasonable and deadly force and that Johnston's constitutional rights against unreasonable search and seizure were violated. A spokesperson for the family told the press that as part of the lawsuit the family might ask for the street on which Johnston had lived to be renamed to Kathryn Johnston street.

Sarah Dozier, Johnston's niece, filed a motion asking a federal judge for sanctions against the city of Atlanta because she said it had withheld documents in a wrongful death lawsuit. Dozier's suit against the city had claimed that the incentives for the police to lie to obtain the warrant involved the quota system, which gives officers quotas for arrests and warrants. According to Dozier's motion, Lawyers for Johnston's family had asked the Atlanta Police Department for documents about the quotas before the trial began; the police chief had denied the existence of the quota system and the department indicated that there were no such documents. Dozier's motion claims that her lawyers obtained the documents another way and that APD officers had verified their authenticity during pretrial testimony. Alex White, the man the officers had used as their informant, also filed a lawsuit against Atlanta and police, claiming officers had held him against his will to pressure him to lie for the cover-up. In August 2010, Johnston's family was awarded $4.9 million in a settlement.

Rev. Markel Hutchins, who according to pleadings filed, "served as the Estate/Family Spokesman; principal strategist and issue manager" during the pendency of the suit against the City of Atlanta, filed a lawsuit against Dozier in August 2011 in order to enforce a $490,000 consulting fee he claims he is owed for his efforts "that made the significant settlement possible." The lawsuit was settled in 2013 for an undisclosed amount with all parties agreeing to secrecy.

== In popular culture ==
Ohio rappers Bone Thugs-n-Harmony featured audio footage from the scene of protests over the shooting in their song "My Street Blues". Shawn Mullins, a singer/songwriter from Atlanta, wrote and dedicated a song to Kathryn Johnston called "The Ballad of Kathryn Johnston" on his album Honeydew. Atlanta-based rapper Killer Mike referenced the killing in his 2008 song "Pressure", rapping: "If another old lady die in this city/swear to god we'll burn down the fuckin' city". He also cited again the incident alongside the Sean Bell shooting in his 2012 song "Anywhere But Here", rapping: "They raided a house, no drugs were ever found/But a black grandmother laid killed". California rapper Daz Dillinger of Tha Dogg Pound mentioned the shooting in their song "No Mo Police Brutality". David Banner, a rapper and producer from Mississippi, discusses the shooting in his song, "So Long." "Ms. Kathryn Johnston was murdered by police / In Northwest Atlanta, but I don't hear it in the streets." The full verse describes more details of the event.

== See also ==
- Obstruction of justice
- Police brutality
- Police corruption
- List of killings by law enforcement officers in the United States
