= Kathryn Johnston Memorial Park =

Park in Atlanta, Georgia, USA

- Location within Atlanta Location within Georgia Location within the United States
- Location: English Avenue, Atlanta, Georgia, United States
- Coordinates: 33°45′51″N 84°24′58″W
- Opening: November 21, 2019

Kathryn Johnston Memorial Park is a park in the English Avenue neighborhood of Atlanta, Georgia, United States.

== History ==
The park is one in a series of parks to be built in the area to mitigate flooding, with the park capable of managing up to 3.5 million gallons of rainwater per year. The park had its groundbreaking in summer 2018. Located along Joseph E. Boone Boulevard, the park was initially to be called Boone West Park, but shortly before its groundbreaking was renamed to honor Kathryn Johnston, who had lived nearby and was killed in a police shooting in 2006. The park was officially opened on November 21, 2019, on the 13th anniversary of Johnston's death. That same year, Atlanta City Council voted to install a plaque honoring former councilmember Ivory Lee Young in the park.

== Bibliography ==
- Bethea, Sally (December 2, 2019). "Above the Waterline: In praise of Kathryn Johnston Memorial Park". Atlanta INtown Paper.
- Burns, Asia S. (August 20, 2018). "Police shooting victim honored with memorial park". The Atlanta Journal-Constitution. Cox Enterprises.
- Green, Josh (November 22, 2019). "Atlanta park opens in honor of 92-year-old neighborhood matriarch killed by police". Curbed Atlanta. Vox Media. Archived from the original on November 27, 2019.
- Habersham, Raisa (November 6, 2019). "Plaque honoring late Atlanta councilman to be installed at park". The Atlanta Journal-Constitution. Cox Enterprises.
- "Kathryn Johnston Memorial Park groundbreaking in English Ave. Neighborhood". WAGA-TV. Fox Television Stations. August 24, 2018.
