= Rodney Cook Sr. Park =

Park in Atlanta, Georgia, US

- Location within Atlanta
- Type: Community park
- Location: Vine City, Atlanta, Georgia, US
- Coordinates: 33°45′44″N 84°24′28″W
- Area: 16-acre (6.5 ha)

Rodney Cook Sr. Park, is a 16-acre (6.5 ha) park in the Vine City neighborhood of Atlanta, near Mercedes-Benz Stadium. It is named after the local politician Rodney Mims Cook Sr. The park officially opened on June 29, 2021.

== History ==
The park's construction was completed by a partnership among the Trust for Public Land (who oversaw design and construction), the City of Atlanta Department of Parks and Recreation, the City of Atlanta Department of Watershed Management, and the local community. A major goal of the $40 million park was to manage stormwater and prevent flooding in the community. The park was created after dozens of homes flooded in 2002, kicking off a long process of advocacy groups like Park Pride promoting the idea of a park and the government buying and razing 60 properties to convert the land. In 2024, Hurricane Helene flooded much of the park but not the surrounding neighborhood.

A statue of politician and civil rights leader John Lewis, by sculptor Gregory Johnson is located in the park. The statue was unveiled on July 7, 2021, and Keisha Lance Bottoms and Andrew Young attended the opening ceremony.
