= Joseph E. Boone =

American civil rights activist

Joseph Everhart Boone
- Born: September 19, 1922; Cedartown, Georgia
- Died: July 15, 2006 (aged 83)
- Education: Gammon Theological Seminary
- Occupation: Reverend
- Known for: Civil rights activist

Joseph Everhart Boone (September 19, 1922 – July 15, 2006) was an American civil rights activist and organizer who marched together with Martin Luther King Jr.

== Biography ==
Joseph E. Boone was the son of John L. and Mattie Roberts Boone.

He attended the Huston–Tillotson University (1950) and earned a Bachelor of Divinity at the Gammon Theological Seminary in 1954.He was a member of the Kappa Alpha Psi fraternity.

Joseph E. Boone was a minister of the First Congregational Church in Anniston, Alabama from 1955 to 1959. From 1959 to 1980, he was Pastor of the Rush Memorial Congregational Church of the Atlanta University Center.

He was a key organizer of the Atlanta Movement, which led to the integration of lunch counters and department stores in Atlanta, during the early 1960s. He worked with King, Ralph Abernathy, John Lewis and Andrew Young, but never was recognized to the same degree they were. In 1960, he encouraged Lonnie C. King Jr. (along with Julian Bond an others) to launch the Atlanta Student Movement.

King named Boone as the chief negotiator of Operation Breadbasket, a program that encouraged businesses that sold to African-Americans, to employ and promote African Americans. Boone led a team of more than 200 ministers in more than 30 cities for Operation Breadbasket. He was also in charge of the negotiations with the Atlanta School Committee for the desegregation of the city's school system.

In 1971, he was appointed Governor's Council on Human Relations by President Jimmy Carter. He was also a director of the P.J. Woods Center for the Blind and Senior Citizens where he developed the drug therapy program. Starting in 1974, he collaborated with F. W. Woolworth Company to improve the economic development of black communities. He was a chairman of the board of B.D.&O. Associates, Inc which oversaw the management of several other businesses. In 1985, he purchased a clothes and garments sewing plant that he integrated to B.D.&O.

Rev. Jesse Jackson took over for Boone afterwards.

== Awards ==
- 1959: Civic Leader of the Year by the First Congregational Church
- 1967: Excelsior Knights Citizenship Award
- 1973: National Labor Relations Award
- 2002: United Church of Christ Meritorious Award
- 2003: Civil Rights Legend Award
- 2006: International Civil Rights Walk of Fame Award

== Personal life ==
Boone married Alethea Williams. They had two daughters: Jolaunda and Andrea.

== Posthumous honors ==
In March 2008 Boone's memory was honored when Simpson Road/Street in Northwest Atlanta was renamed Joseph E. Boone Blvd. in his honor.
