= National Register of Historic Places listings in Perry County, Alabama =

Location of Perry County in Alabama

This is a list of the National Register of Historic Places listings in Perry County, Alabama.

This is intended to be a complete list of the properties and districts on the National Register of Historic Places in Perry County, Alabama, United States. Latitude and longitude coordinates are provided for many National Register properties and districts; these locations may be seen together in a Google map.

There are 19 properties and districts listed on the National Register in the county, including one National Historic Landmark.

This National Park Service list is complete through NPS recent listings posted May 1, 2026.

== Current listings ==
	Name on the Register	Image	Date listed	Location	City or town	Description
1	Bryand Brand House		August 6, 2010 (#10000523)	Route 1, Box 260; 32°40′26″N 87°23′46″W	Folsom vicinity	
2	Chapel and Lovelace Hall, Marion Military Institute	Chapel and Lovelace Hall, Marion Military Institute	September 13, 1978 (#78000508)	State Route 14; 32°37′25″N 87°19′19″W	Marion	Buildings at Marion Military Institute
3	Fairhope Plantation	Fairhope Plantation	May 29, 1992 (#92000630)	U.S. Route 80 1 mile east of the Uniontown city limits 32°26′43″N 87°29′27″W	Uniontown	
4	First Congregational Church of Marion	First Congregational Church of Marion	December 17, 1982 (#82001614)	601 Clay St. 32°37′39″N 87°19′42″W	Marion	
5	Green Street Historic District	Green Street Historic District	May 30, 1979 (#79000400)	203-751 W. Green St. 32°38′00″N 87°19′28″W	Marion	
6	Henry House	Henry House	September 25, 1986 (#86002744)	S. Washington St. 32°36′36″N 87°19′06″W	Marion	
7	Judson College Historic District	Judson College Historic District	February 3, 1993 (#92001825)	Roughly bounded by E. Lafayette, Curb, Mason and Washington Sts. 32°37′49″N 87°18′52″W	Marion	
8	Kenworthy Hall	Kenworthy Hall	August 23, 1990 (#90001318)	State Route 14, west of Marion; 32°38′07″N 87°21′08″W	Marion	
9	Lincoln Normal School		November 29, 2022 (#100001479)	205 Lincoln St. 32°37′33″N 87°19′45″W	Marion	
10	Marion Courthouse Square Historic District	Marion Courthouse Square Historic District	February 16, 1996 (#96000111)	Roughly along Green, Washington, Jefferson, Jackson, Franklin, Clements, Centreville, and Monroe Sts. 32°37′58″N 87°19′07″W	Marion	
11	Moore-Webb-Holmes Plantation	Moore-Webb-Holmes Plantation	August 24, 2011 (#11000566)	Junction of AL 14 & Webb Rd. 32°40′56″N 87°24′15″W	Marion vicinity	
12	Old Perry County High School	Old Perry County High School	October 4, 1973 (#73000372)	202 W. Monroe St. 32°38′05″N 87°19′16″W	Marion	
13	Phillips Memorial Auditorium	Phillips Memorial Auditorium	February 13, 1990 (#88003243)	Lincoln Ave. and Lee St. 32°37′32″N 87°19′45″W	Marion	Part of the Lincoln Normal School
14	Pitts' Folly	Pitts' Folly	August 9, 1984 (#84000717)	Old Cahaba Rd. 32°26′42″N 87°30′30″W	Uniontown	
15	President's House, Marion Institute	President's House, Marion Institute	May 14, 1979 (#79000401)	110 Brown St. 32°37′30″N 87°19′13″W	Marion	President's house of Marion Military Institute
16	Siloam Baptist Church	Siloam Baptist Church	December 27, 1982 (#82001615)	503 Washington St. 32°37′51″N 87°19′10″W	Marion	
17	Uniontown Historic District	Uniontown Historic District	February 24, 2000 (#00000137)	Roughly bounded by Tomasene St., Taylor St., East Ave., and Green St. 32°27′10″N 87°30′52″W	Uniontown	
18	West Marion Historic District	West Marion Historic District	April 22, 1993 (#92001844)	Roughly bounded by W. Lafayette St., Washington St., Murfree Ave., College St., and Margin St. 32°37′34″N 87°19′20″W	Marion	
19	Westwood	Westwood	November 21, 1974 (#74000433)	North of Uniontown off State Route 61; also roughly bounded by U.S. Route 80, State Route 61, Rabbit Yard Rd., and the old Uniontown railroad spur 32°27′35″N 87°30′53″W	Uniontown	Second set of boundaries represents a boundary increase of December 10, 1984, the Westwood Plantation

== See also ==
- List of National Historic Landmarks in Alabama
- National Register of Historic Places listings in Alabama
