= Greene Street Historic District =

Greene Street Historic District or Green Street Historic District or variations may refer to:

- Green Street Historic District (Marion, Alabama), listed on the NRHP in Perry County, Alabama
- Greene Street Historic District (Augusta, Georgia), listed on the NRHP in Richmond County, Georgia
- Green Street District (Gainesville, Georgia), listed on the NRHP in Hall County, Georgia
- Green Street-Brenau Historic District, Gainesville, Georgia, listed on the NRHP in Hall County, Georgia
- Greene Street Historic District (Cumberland, Maryland), NRHP-listed
- Hawley-Green Street Historic District, Syracuse, New York, NRHP-listed
- North Green Street-Bouchelle Street Historic District, Morganton, North Carolina, listed on the NRHP in Burke County, North Carolina
