= Reverie (Marion, Alabama) =

Historic house in Alabama, United States

- U.S. Historic district – Contributing property
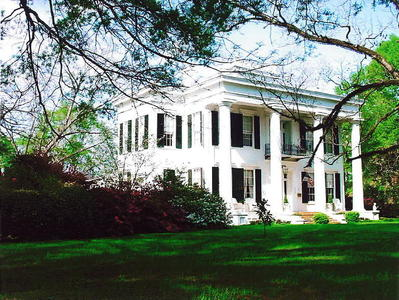

- Location within Alabama Location within the United States
- Interactive map showing the location for Reverie
- Location: 110 West Lafayette Street Marion, Alabama
- Coordinates: 32°37′54″N 87°19′13″W
- Architectural style: Greek Revival
- Part of: West Marion Historic District (ID92001844)
- Designated CP: April 22, 1993

Reverie is a historic Greek Revival mansion built circa 1858 in Marion, Perry County, Alabama. It now serves as a residence and also historic house museum. It is listed on the National Register of Historic Places as a contributing property to the West Marion Historic District and was recorded by the Historic American Buildings Survey. It is featured in Ralph Hammond's Antebellum Mansions of Alabama, Gregory Hatcher's Reverie Mansion and Gardens, and Jennifer Hale's Historic Plantations of Alabama's Black Belt.

== History ==
The property on which Reverie sits was sold on February 9, 1858, for $4,000, a large sum in that day, to Joseph Thompson Whitsitt, a planter (according to the census) and railroad investor. Wartime financial reverses led Mr. Whitsitt to sell the mansion on November 28, 1862, for $10,000 to Edward Kenworthy Carlisle, a wealthy cotton broker who also owned one of the finest mansions in Alabama, Kenworthy Hall, located only a few miles away.

Carlisle shortly sold the house again on April 28, 1863, to David Scott, a merchant and cotton, grist, and saw mill operator and manufacturer. Scott died on August 9, 1868, and left a will recording the furnishings of the mansion at that time. Harrison H. Hurt, son of a prominent merchant and planter, bought the mansion in 1871 at auction for $4,650. Mr. Hurt's daughter Nellie married Dr. R.C. Hanna and the mansion became known as the Hurt-Hanna House.

After Mrs. Hanna's death in 1944, the house was sold to Dr. William T. Weissinger, who in the course of a distinguished career had been General Douglas MacArthur's physician in the army. Mrs. Weissinger first named the house Reverie which it has remained ever since. Since Dr. Weissinger's death in 1971, the house has been owned by a number of families, each of which maintained it as a residence.

While the house was owned by David Scott in the 1860s, Union troops occupied the town of Marion and used the house as their headquarters. Some markings of these troops can be found in the attic.

== Architecture ==
Four white Doric columns of brick, covered with stucco, give this Greek Revival mansion its monumental appearance. The house features a massive frieze board with dentil moldings which surrounds the entire home. Board siding and double hung paned windows are all original. A cupola or belvedere with classical balustrade sits atop the low-hipped roof and there is also a balcony above the entrance.

The mansion is a standard four-room over four-room house with a spacious central hall and grand, unsupported staircase, but also has two story cabinet rooms on the east and west sides. These flanking rooms were unusual at the time and, together with the portico, made the design quite distinctive. Two outbuildings survive: the original kitchen, now connected to the house, and a brick smokehouse.

The interior of the Mansion includes elaborate plaster moldings and medallions, original to house, along with inlaid flooring of oak and mahogany which was added later. The ceiling height downstairs is 14' and upstairs 13' with original heart pine floors in most areas.

In the garden, a Wisteria arbor is thought to predate the construction of the house by several decades and may be the oldest surviving Wisteria in Alabama. There is also a boxwood parterre (knot garden or maze) which was probably put in sometime after the turn of the 19th century and was restored in recent decades.

== Gallery ==
Reverie at Night

Knot Garden
