= John Dozier =

American politician

John Dozier was an American politician. He was a member of the Alabama House of Representatives. He served in 1871 and 1873.

In 1873 he represented Perry County, Alabama along with P. G. Clarke and G. S. W. Lewis.

He was enslaved and was owned by a college president in Virginia who manumitted him. His wife and son had been sold to and were on a plantation in Alabama. Dozier went to them. He became a pastor and settled in Marion County, Alabama where he founded the First Colored Baptist Church. He was a trustee of Lincoln Normal School.

He and other black Alabama legislators of the Reconstruction era are commemorated on a historical marker.
