= James Webb Curtis =

American physician (1856–1921)

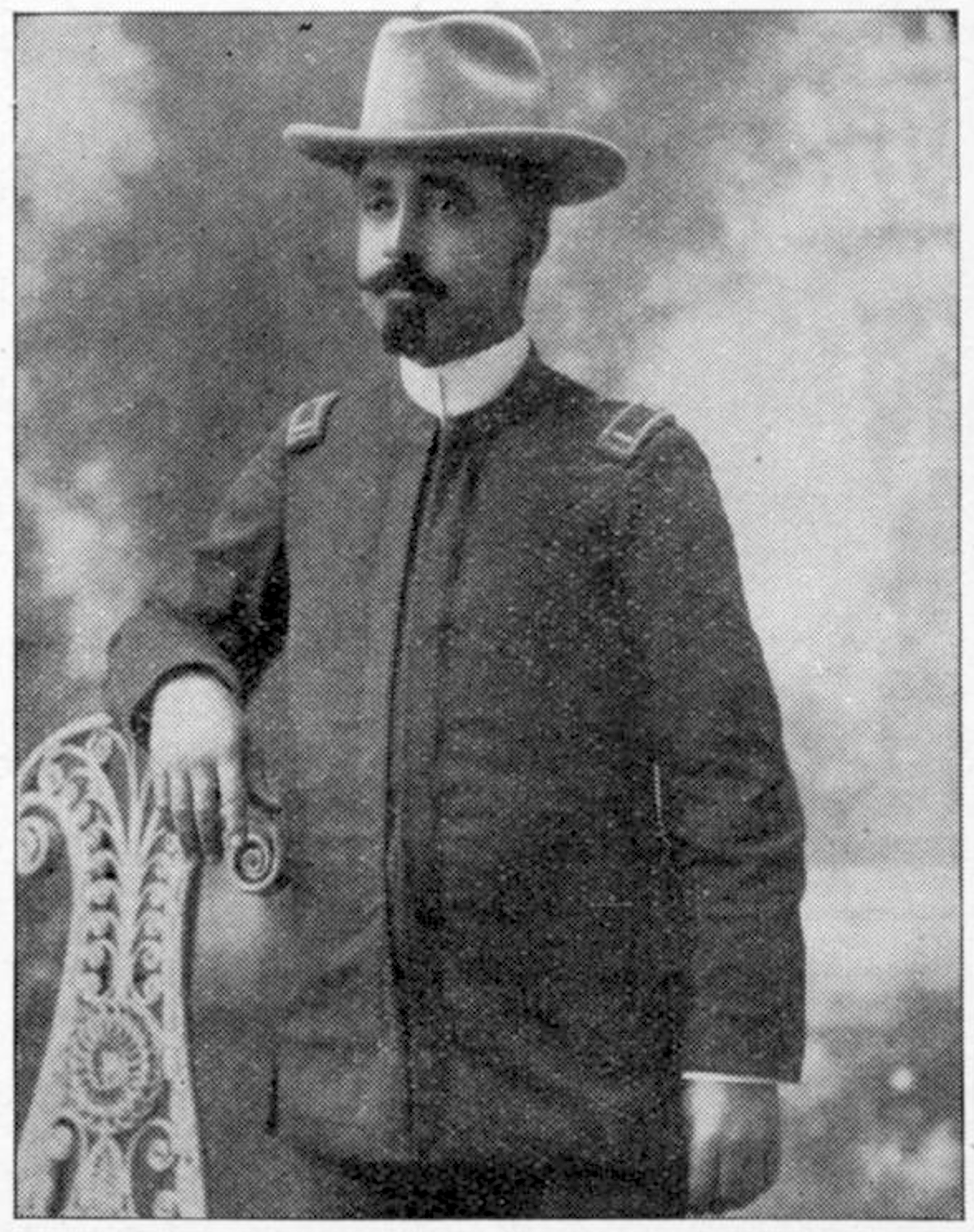
- James Webb Curtis in 1900
- Born: July 29, 1856; Marion, Alabama, United States
- Died: April 12, 1921 (aged 64); Hot Springs, Arkansas, United States
- Other name: J. Webb Curtis
- Education: Alabama State Normal School, Howard University College of Medicine
- Occupations: Physician, surgeon, civil servant, educator, postmaster
- Title: First lieutenant
- Spouse: Alice May Peyton (m. 1881–1921; his death)
- Children: 2
- Father: Alexander H. Curtis

James Webb Curtis, M.D. (July 29, 1856 – April 12, 1921), also known as J. Webb Curtis, was an American physician, surgeon, civil servant, educator, and postmaster. He served as a volunteer medical officer for the U.S. Army during the Spanish–American War, stationed in Cuba and in the Philippines. He was, "the only 'colored' surgeon in the service" during that conflict.

== Biography ==
James Webb Curtis was born on July 29, 1856, in Marion, Alabama, into an African American family. His mother was Princess Curtis, and his father was Alexander H. Curtis who was enslaved before becoming a merchant, and served six years in the Alabama Senate during the Reconstruction era. His brother William P. Curtis was also a prominent physician. Curtis served as postmaster in Marion, Alabama (prior to 1921).

Curtis attended Lincoln Normal School, and the Alabama State Normal School (now Alabama State University). This was followed by later study at the Howard University College of Medicine, where he graduated in 1888.

In May 1881, Curtis married Alice May Peyton from Richmond, Virginia. Together they had two daughters.

== Career ==
For 6 years he taught school in Alabama, and held a professorship at his alma mater Alabama State Normal School in 1879.

In 1882, Curtis was appointed to a clerkship in the Bureau of Pensions in Washington. D.C. While living in D.C., he started taking an interest in studying medicine. Curtis attended Howard University College of Medicine (HUCM), graduating in 1888. After graduating from HUCM, he served as a special agent in the pension office in Illinois and Nebraska from 1889 to 1891.

In October 1891, Curtis moved to Illinois, and established a medical practice in Chicago, located at 5003 Dearborn Street. He also worked as medical staff at Provident Hospital, Chicago.

In June 1898, Curtis enrolled in the 8th Regiment Illinois Infantry during the Spanish–American War, and he was appointed as first lieutenant (assistant surgeon). He was stationed at Palma Soriana, Cuba from August 22, 1898, to February 13, 1899, where he worked as a medical officer for a detachment (companies E and F). Curtis was hospitalized for malaria with dysentery in February, and left for Chicago by April.

In September 1899, Curtis applied for a new contract, and served in the African American 48th Volunteer Infantry in the Philippines. He was first on duty at Caloocan, with the 3rd Battalion; followed by duty at La Loma Church with the 1st Battalion; and then duty at Alilem, Quimpusa, and Tagudin. He returned to the United States, via San Francisco, on June 30, 1901. His obituaries reads that he returned to the Philippines, staying for three years before returning to practice medicine in Chicago.

== Death and legacy ==
He died after a brief illness of apoplexy on April 12, 1921, in Hot Springs, Arkansas.

Booker T. Washington profiled him in the book, A New Negro for a New Century (1900). He is mentioned in the A'Lelia Bundles book, Self Made: Inspired by the Life of Madam C.J. Walker (2020, Simon & Schuster), recounting a time when Madam C. J. Walker stayed with Curtis family over a Christmas holiday.
