= Nicola Marschall =

American painter (1829–1917)

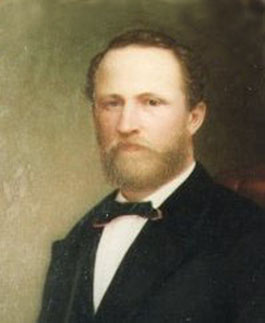
- Self portrait of Nicola Marschall
- Born: March 16, 1829; Sankt Wendel, Principality of Lichtenberg, Saxe-Coburg-Gotha
- Died: February 24, 1917 (aged 87); Louisville, Kentucky, U.S.
- Resting place: Cave Hill Cemetery; Louisville, Kentucky, U.S.
- Known for: Designing the Confederate uniform and the Confederate flag

Nicola Marschall is said to have been the designer of the first Stars and Bars.

Nicola Marschall (March 16, 1829 – February 24, 1917) was a German-American artist who supported the Confederate cause during the American Civil War. He designed the original Confederate flag, the Stars and Bars, as well as the official grey uniform of the Confederate army.

== Biography ==
On March 16, 1829, Marschall was born in Sankt Wendel, Germany, to a wealthy Prussian family of tobacco merchants.

In 1849, Marschall emigrated to the United States through New Orleans, Louisiana, headed for the home of a relative in Mobile, Alabama.

In 1851, Marschall relocated to Marion, Alabama, where he began teaching art first at his portrait studio, and then at the Marion Female Seminary. During this time he briefly returned to Germany to further his art technique.

Mary Clay Lockett, wife of prominent Marion attorney Napoleon Lockett, requested of Marschall to take part in the competition to create a new flag to represent the Confederate States of America. Marschall's design became the first Confederate flag, first raised in Montgomery, Alabama, on March 4, 1861. During the Civil War, Marschall served in the Second Regiment of Confederate Engineer Troops, under Samuel Lockett. After the war, he returned to Marion and married Martha Eliza Marshall.

During his career, Marschall painted portraits of Jefferson Davis, Abraham Lincoln, Otto von Bismarck, various Southern families, and Confederate and Union soldiers. He was one of the few who was able to have Nathan Bedford Forrest pose for him. Additionally, he did many landscapes and religious paintings. He was known to sign and date his portraits using a steel pen while the paint was still wet, at the bottom-right of the portrait.

Due to the economic depression in the South following the war, Marschall returned to Mobile in 1872. In 1873, he and his family moved to Louisville, Kentucky, as his friends told him it would be an easier place to gain commissions to do portraits. At the Centennial International Exposition in Philadelphia in 1876, he won a medal for his portraits.

In 1908, Marschall gave up working on portraits.

On February 24, 1917, Marschall died in Louisville, Kentucky. His remains were interred at Cave Hill Cemetery.

== Gallery ==
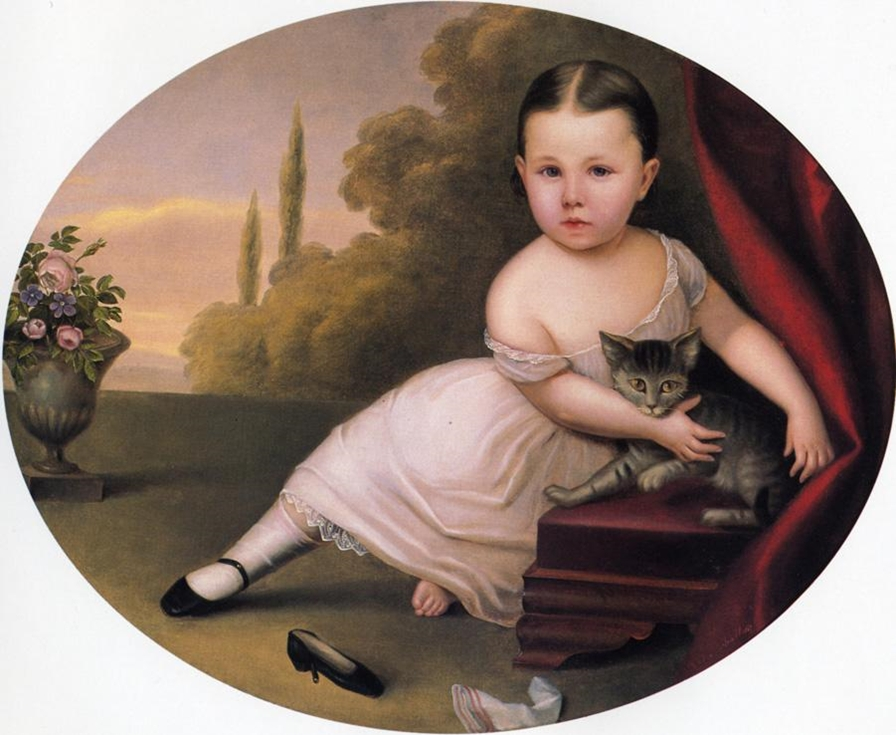
Young Girl with Cat, 1859

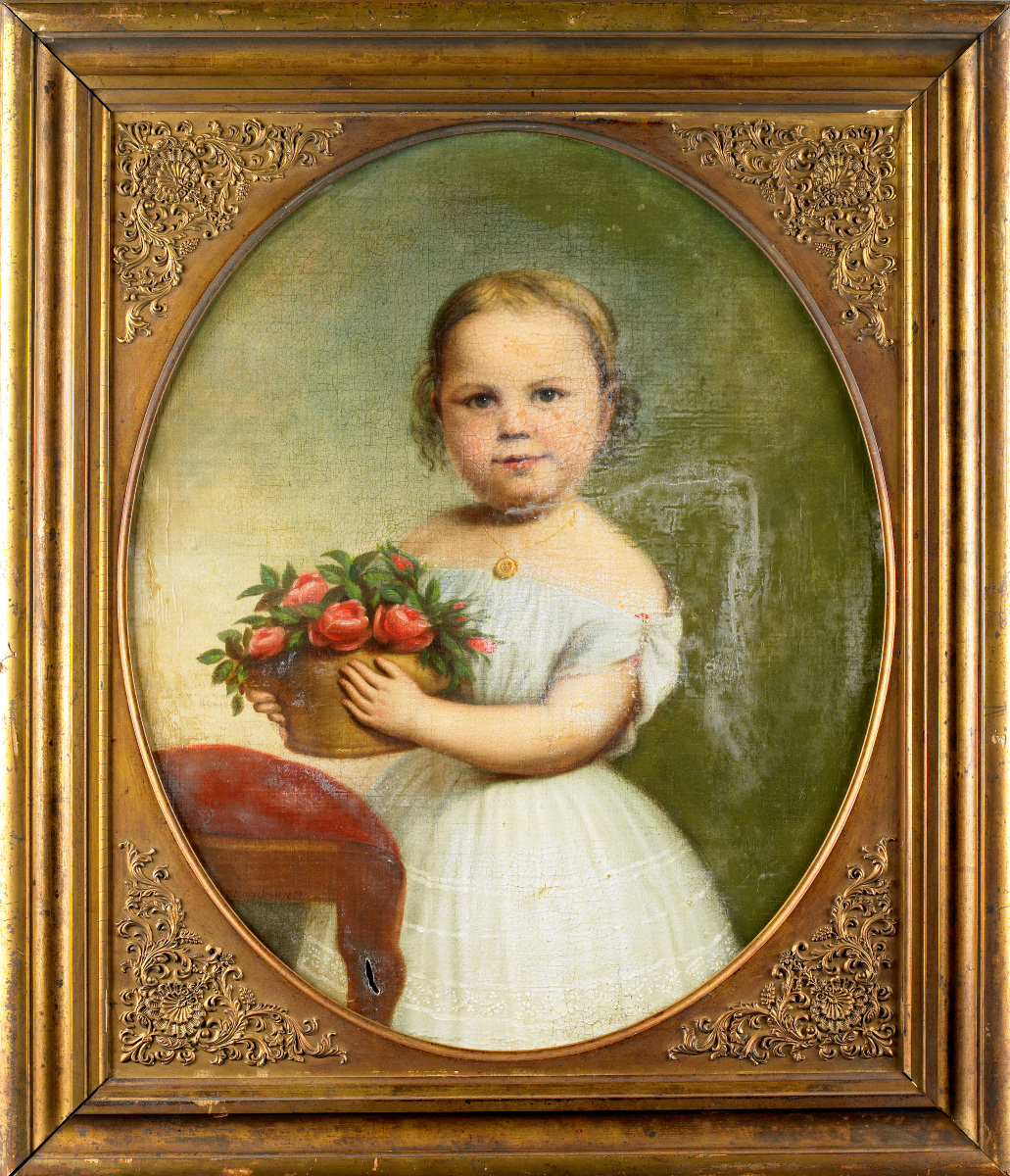
Mary Susan Robins, 1859

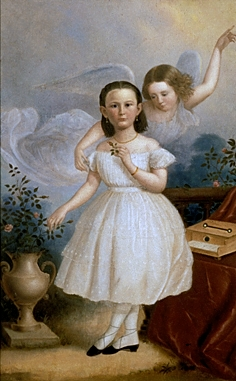
The Hale Child, 1863

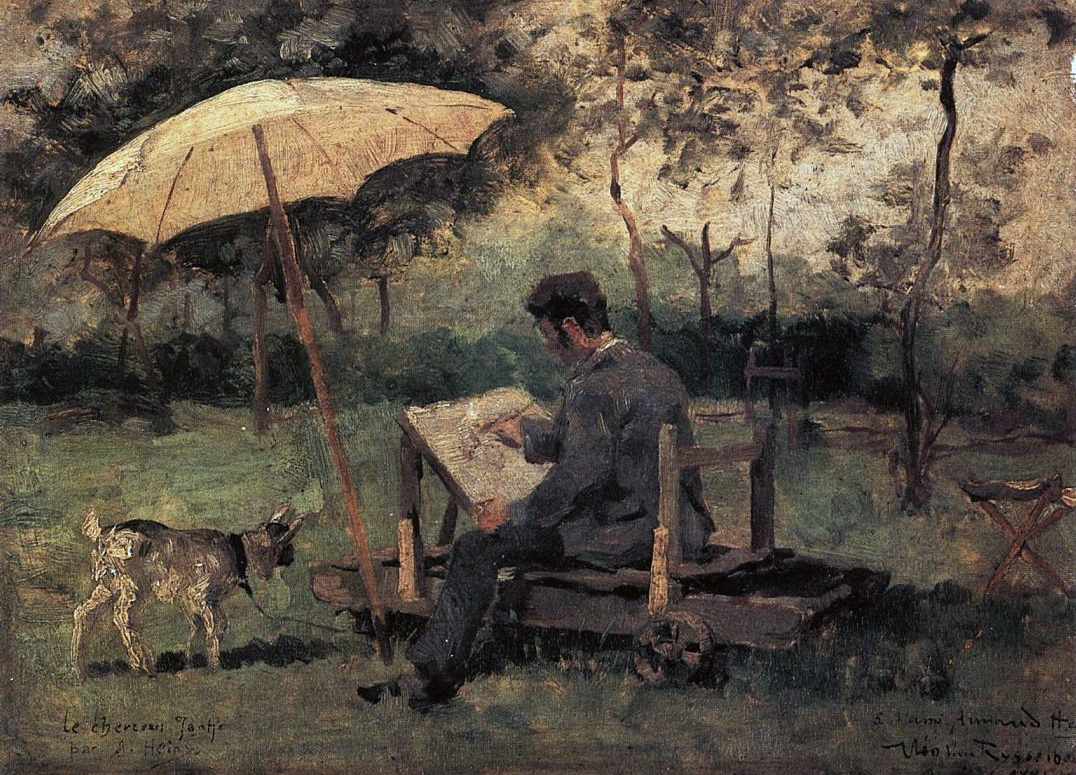
Nicola Marschall, 1881

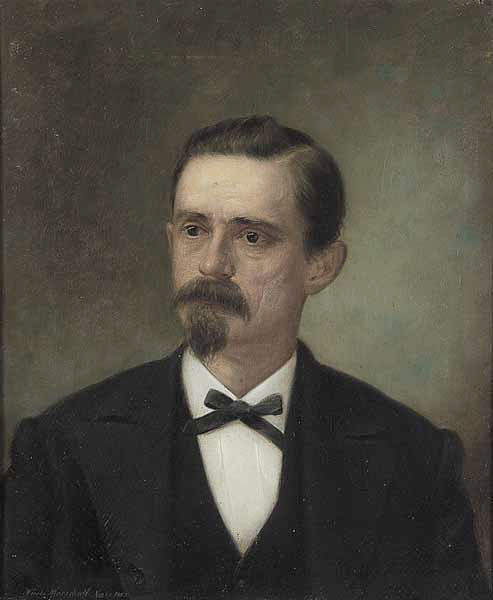
Napoleon Lockett, 1883
