= Moore-Webb-Holmes Plantation =

- U.S. National Register of Historic Places
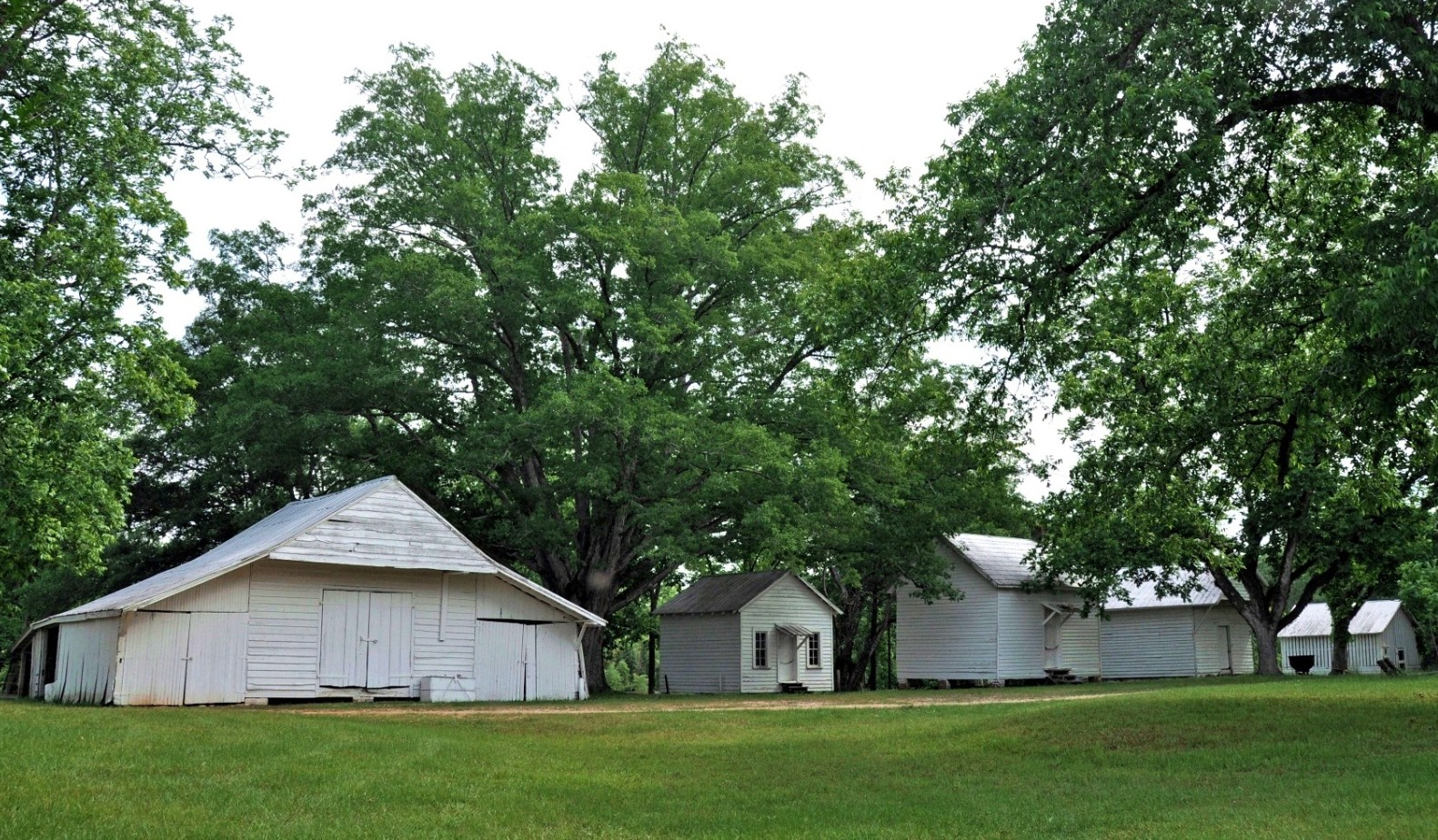

- Location within Alabama Location within the United States
- Nearest city: Marion, Alabama
- Coordinates: 32°40′56″N 87°24′15″W
- NRHP reference No.: 11000566
- Added to NRHP: August 24, 2011

The Moore-Webb-Holmes Plantation is a historic active plantation on Alabama State Route 14 near Marion, Alabama. The plantation began with 80 acres (32 ha) in 1819 and gradually expanded to thousands of acres. Although the main house burned in 1927, the outbuildings, barns, cook house and other buildings remain intact and preserved. It continues to operate as a working farm and has been continuously owned by descendants of the original owner. It was added to the National Register of Historic Places on August 24, 2011.
