= Pauline E. Dinkins =

American medical missionary

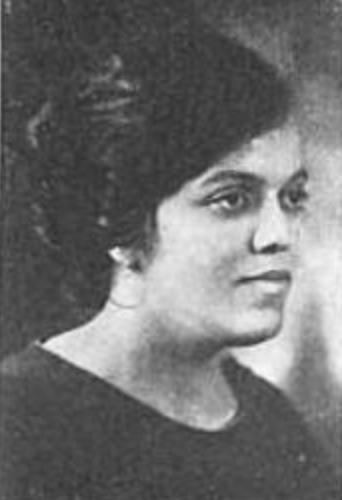
- Pauline E. Dinkins, from a 1929 publication
- Born: Pauline Elizabeth Dinkins; December 30, 1891; Marion, Alabama, U.S.
- Died: March 6, 1961 (age 69); Selma, Alabama, U.S.
- Occupations: Physician, medical missionary

Pauline Elizabeth Dinkins (December 30, 1891 – March 6, 1961) was an American physician and medical educator from Selma, Alabama, who worked as a missionary in Liberia in 1928 and 1929. She also published a book, African Folk Tales (1933), illustrated by the poet Effie Lee Newsome.

== Early life and education ==
Dinkins was born in Marion, Alabama, the daughter of Rev. Charles Spencer Dinkins and Pauline Elizabeth Sears Dinkins. Her father, who was born into slavery, was the president of Selma University. Her brother William H. Dinkins was also president of Selma University. She graduated from Selma University in 1906, and Hartshorn Memorial College in 1911. She earned her medical degree at the Women's Medical College of Pennsylvania in 1917. She pursued further studies at the London School of Tropical Medicine in 1927 and 1928.

== Career ==
Dinkins was resident physician at Tuskegee Institute from 1924 to 1925, and head of the Brewer Hospital and Nurse Training School in Greenwood, South Carolina. "Through the wards of a hospital, a community is blessed; through its training school, many communities are blessed," she explained in 1927. She became a medical missionary in 1928, as medical director of a Baptist hospital in Monrovia, Liberia, working with American nurse Ruth E. Occomy.

Dinkins's missionary work was cut short by illness, and she returned to the United States to recover in 1929. She conducted a private practice in Selma for over twenty years, and was a resident physician at John A. Andrew Memorial Hospital. In 1931, she donated $500 to build a missionary hospital in West Africa. In 1949 she was honored by Color magazine as one of the "outstanding Negro women who made their mark in 1948."

== Publications ==
- "Soul Sick" (1924, poem in a medical journal)
- "Sarcoma of Superior Maxillary Bone and Pellagra" (1925, article)
- "The Student's Health" (1926, article)
- African Folk Tales (1933, book, illustrated by Effie Lee Newsome)
- "When" (1941, poem)

Dinkins's book African Folk Tales (1933) was re-released in 2002, edited by her niece, Pauline Dinkins Anderson, a noted organist and music educator in Selma. Dinkins wrote professional articles for the Medical Woman's Journal in the 1940s.

== Personal life ==
In her later years, Dinkins lived with her sisters Mabel (a teacher), Daisy (a pharmacist) and Ethel (a music teacher) in Selma. She became paralyzed in 1951, and died in 1961, at the age of 69. At least two of her nephews became prominent in Selma. The Dinkins family's role in Selma's civil rights and cultural history was recognized when the Burwell-Dinkins-Anderson House became a museum, and was placed on the National Register of Historic Places in 2022.
