= Bryand Brand House =

Historic house in Alabama, United States

- U.S. National Register of Historic Places
- Location within Alabama Location within the United States
- Nearest city: Marion, Alabama
- Coordinates: 32°40′26″N 87°23′46″W
- Built: 1845
- NRHP reference No.: 10000523
- Added to NRHP: June 22, 2010

The Bryand Brand House is a historic plantation house on the east side of Alabama State Route 14 near Marion, Alabama. The two-story Greek Revival style house was built in 1845. Unique features of the interior are the treatment of the wide central hall as a quasi-dogtrot, the double-leaf front door, and the original rabbeted sheathing found on all of the ceilings and on the walls of the central halls. The house was moved to its current site in 1978 to save it from destruction. It was added to the National Register of Historic Places on June 22, 2010.
