= Marion Female Seminary =

- U.S. National Register of Historic Places
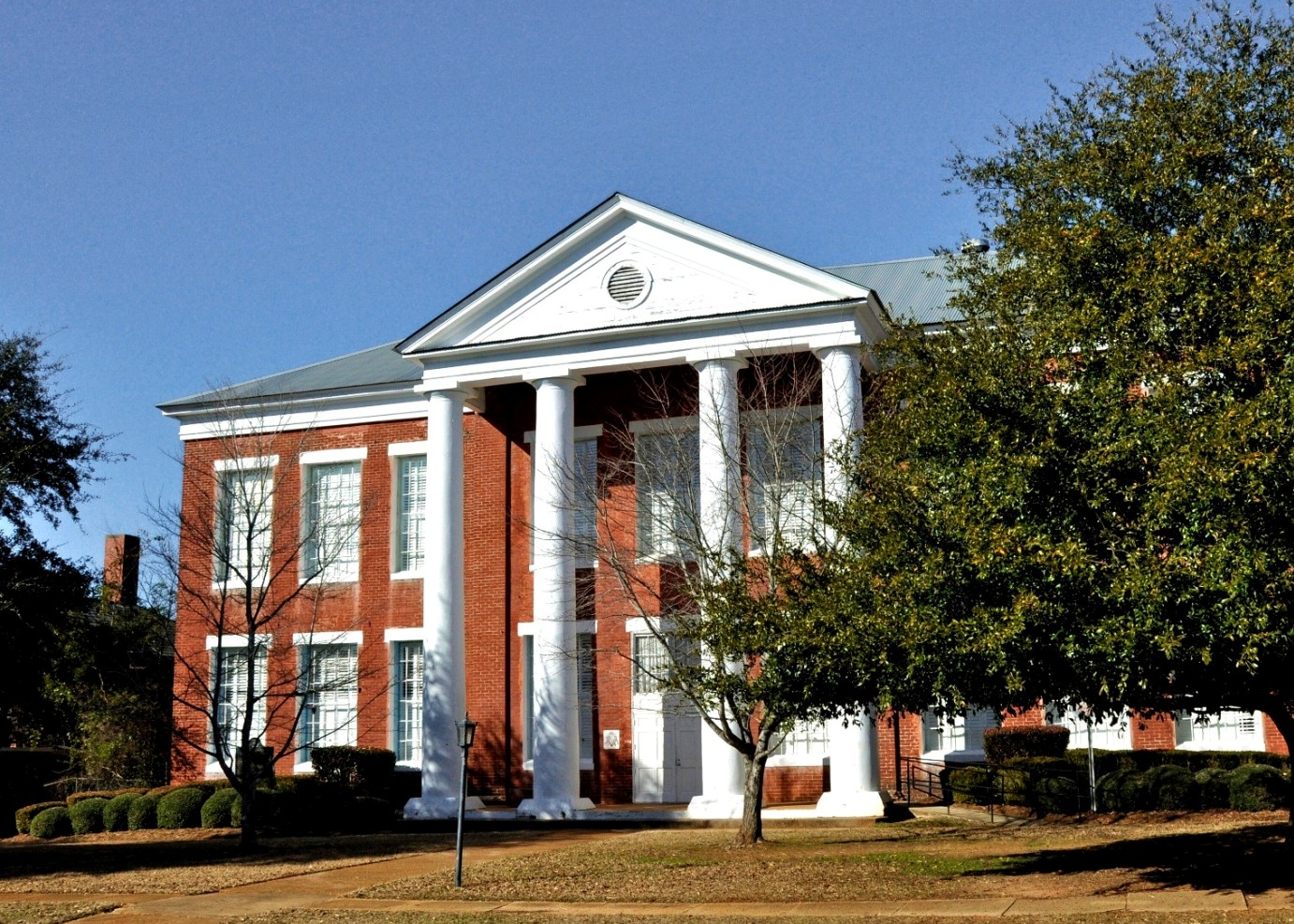
- The Marion Female Seminary in 2009

- Location within Alabama Location within the United States
- Location: 202 Monroe St. Marion, Alabama
- Coordinates: 32°38′5″N 87°19′16″W
- Architectural style: Greek Revival
- NRHP reference No.: 73000372
- Added to NRHP: October 4, 1973

The Marion Female Seminary, also known as the Old Perry County High School, is a historic Greek Revival-style school building utilizing the Doric order in Marion, Alabama. It was listed on the National Register of Historic Places on October 4, 1973.

== History ==
The Marion Female Seminary was established in 1836, with this building completed in 1850. The building contained the studio of artist Nicola Marschall when he taught at the school. He taught painting, music, French, and German while employed here. He is credited with designing the first Confederate flag. He also designed the gray Confederate military uniform, influenced by the mid-1800s uniforms of the Austrian and French Armies.

Built to serve as a female seminary from the time of construction, it was subsequently owned by the city of Marion from 1918 to 1930, at which time it was transferred to state ownership for use as a Perry County public school. Originally a three-story building, it was remodeled in 1930 with the removal of the uppermost floor from the building.

It currently houses the Perry County Historical Society and the Perry County High School Alumni Association.

== See also ==
- National Register of Historic Places listings in Perry County, Alabama
- Women in education in the United States
- Historical Marker Database
