= Alexander H. Curtis =

Alabama reconstruction era American politician

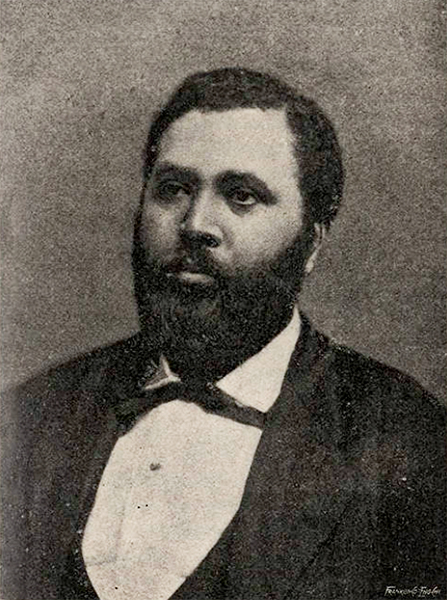

Alabama House of Representatives
- In office 1870–1872

Alabama Senate
- In office 1872–1874

Personal details
- Born: 1829 Raleigh, North Carolina, U.S.
- Died: July 20, 1878 (aged 48–49) Marion, Alabama, U.S.
- Party: Republican

Alexander H. Curtis (1829 – July 20, 1878) was an American politician, he served as a state legislator in the Alabama House of Representatives and the Alabama Senate during the Reconstruction Era.

== Early life ==
Curtis was born 1829, a slave, in Raleigh, North Carolina on E. Haywood's plantation, then was taken to Alabama when ten years old in 1839. While young he worked as a servant and in a general store.

== Life and non political career ==
As an adult he worked as a barber and in others trades in Marion, Alabama saving for his freedom. By 1859 he had saved enough to be able to purchase his own freedom at the price of $2,000 after-which he left Alabama and moved to New York.

After the Civil War he returned to Alabama and set up again as a barber head of a trade concern.

He continued until 1875 when he was considered "out of business" even though he had been rated as "honest and reliable" by credit assessors.

In 1867 he was one of nine former slaves, known as The Marion 9, that setup the Lincoln School of Marion.

He also was one of the founders of Selma University and was described as an active member of the Second Baptist Church in Marion.

== Reconstruction era political career ==
Curtis represented Perry County, Alabama at the 1867 Constitutional Convention.

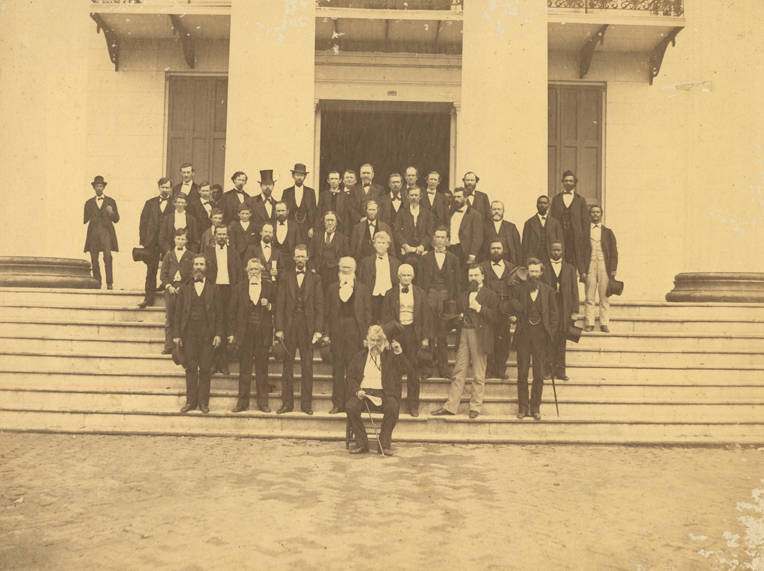
Photo of Alabama Senate members in 1872 on the capitol steps

He represented Perry County in the Alabama House of Representatives from 1870 to 1872 and then the Alabama Senate from 1872 to 1874. He and other 1872 Alabama Senators were photographed on the capitol steps. The photograph is held by the Alabama Department of Archives and History. He was the only African-American lawmaker to preside over the Alabama Senate during this era.

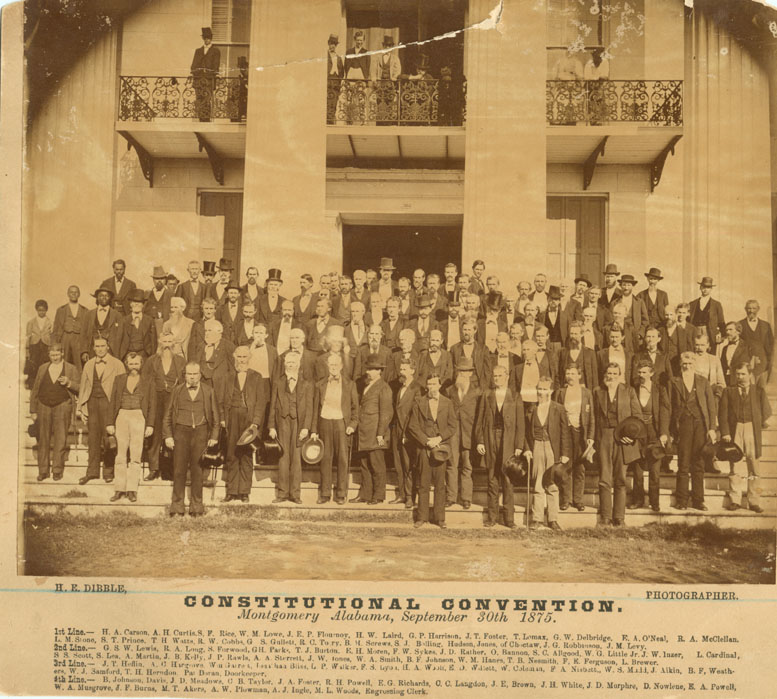
Delegates at the 1875 Alabama Constitutional Convention

He was also one of the county commissioners in 1874 and was a delegate to the state constitutional convention in 1875. He was accused along with Greene S. W. Lewis of being bigoted and attempting to rally the black majority to vote against the constitutional convention.

He was also a delegate to the 1876 Republican National Convention, and the 1878 Radical State Convention.

== Death and legacy ==
He died Saturday July 20, 1878, after falling from his buggy while travelling the lower Marion road with his companion Nick Stephens. He had been aspiring to run for Congress at the time of his death.

Two of his sons became physicians, William P. Curtis of Saint Louis, Missouri, and James Webb Curtis of Chicago; and his son Thomas Curtis was a dentist in Saint Louis.

== See also ==
- African American officeholders from the end of the Civil War until before 1900
