= Jimmy Wilson (robber) =

African-American sentenced to death

- Born: James Edward Wilson; 1904; Alabama, U.S.
- Died: May 5, 1977 (aged 72); Alabama, U.S.
- Status: Deceased
- Convictions: Robbery; Grand larceny (2 counts)
- Penalty: Death; commuted to life imprisonment

James Edward Wilson (1904 – May 5, 1977) (Note: He was 70 years old on or before October 1, 1973, when he was paroled. The 1940 US Census lists him as 35 years old.) was an American farmhand who was convicted of a robbery of an elderly woman by an Alabama court in 1958 and sentenced to death. His case became a cause célèbre due to the small amount stolen ($1.95), the severity of the sentence, and the fact that Wilson, an African-American, was convicted by an all-white jury.

The case became a source of embarrassment for the United States at the height of the Cold War, as it suggested that American promotion of democratic principles overseas was hypocritical when it did not seem to uphold the same standards in its own states.

== Biography ==
James E. Wilson was born in Alabama in 1904. He was illiterate.

Wilson was described as a "ne'er do well drifter", who was arrested eight times between 1929 and 1957. By the 1940 US Census, he was living with his wife in Marion, Perry County, Alabama. By 1957 he was a farmhand.

== The case ==
Wilson was arrested on July 27, 1957, for stealing $1.95 ($23.11 in 2026) at night from a 74-year-old white widow, Estelle Barker, in Marion, Alabama. Barker also testified that Wilson had choked her and attempted to rape her. He denied this charge and was not indicted on it. An all-white jury convicted Wilson of robbery and the judge sentenced him to death in the state's electric chair.

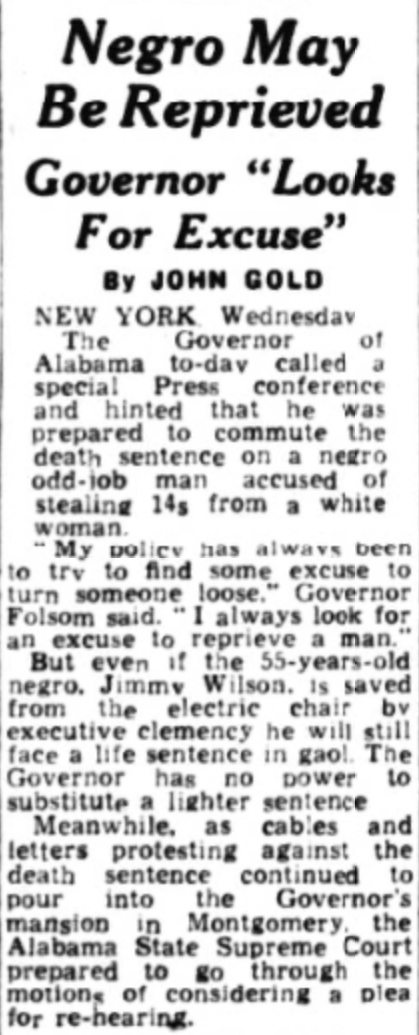
Liverpool Echo, August 27, 1958

The death sentence against Wilson was based on the witness saying the robbery was violent, the robbery taking place in the victim's home, and Wilson having two prior convictions for grand larceny. Wilson admitted to having consumed a substantial amount of alcohol on the day of the incident and that he had been planning the robbery all day.

Robbery in Alabama carried a possible death sentence at the time, albeit no one had ever been sentenced to death for stealing less than $5. The last person to be executed for a robbery that did not result in the victim's death in Alabama was Adolph Smith, who was executed in 1938 for robbing a grocery store of $80 and slashing the throat of owner Ivy Sammons, who miraculously survived his injuries, as he begged for his life.

In September 1958, Wilson's two brothers hired Fred Gray as his legal representative.

The case was appealed to the Alabama Supreme Court, which upheld the death sentence. In its opinion, the Court stressed that the conviction was due to the violent nature of the robbery, and that "the amount of the money ... taken is immaterial." Wilson was scheduled for execution on October 24, 1958.

== International coverage ==
While it was difficult to find anyone who would speak in Wilson's defence in his home town, the case received international coverage, with critical articles appearing in newspapers all across the world. Protest groups were formed and petitions were sent demanding that the death sentence be overturned. The US embassy in London received approximately 600 protest letters. Governor of Alabama Jim Folsom received over 1,000 letters per day urging clemency for Wilson. The British Labour Party and the International Commission of Jurists likewise sent letters urging clemency. Even the Alabama-based Birmingham Post-Herald urged for clemency. The incident was used as propaganda in the Communist press.

The US Secretary of State, John Foster Dulles sent a letter to Folsom, notifying him of the immense international attention the case had received. The sentence was commuted to a life sentence by Folsom on September 29, 1958, which was the most he was legally able to do to aid Wilson without damaging his political career. Folsom commented, "I admit that we have got the worst penal system in the world, including Dark Africa ... I hope the next Legislature will do something about improving the situation."

Wilson was paroled on October 1, 1973, at the age of 69 and having served 16 years in prison. He died after being struck by a car on May 5, 1977, at the age of 72.

== Sources ==
- Dudziak, Mary L. (2001). Cold War Civil Rights: Race and the Image of American Democracy. Princeton University Press.
- Wilson v. State
