= West Marion Historic District =

Historic district in Alabama, United States

- U.S. National Register of Historic Places
- U.S. Historic district
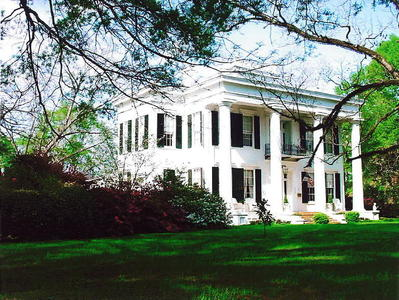
- Reverie, one of the contributing buildings

- Location within Alabama Location within the United States
- Location: Roughly bounded by W. Lafayette St., Washington St., Murfree Ave., College St. and Margin St., Marion, Alabama
- Coordinates: 32°37′34″N 87°19′20″W
- Area: 200 acres (81 ha)
- Architectural style: Colonial Revival, Bungalow/Craftsman, Greek Revival
- NRHP reference No.: 92001844
- Added to NRHP: April 22, 1993

The West Marion Historic District is a historic district in the city of Marion, Alabama. The historic district is bounded by West Lafayette, Washington, College, Margin streets, and Murfree Avenue. It features examples of Colonial Revival, Craftsman, Greek Revival, and regional vernacular architecture. It spans 200 acres (81 ha) and contains 108 contributing properties. One contributing building of special significance is Reverie. The district was placed on the National Register of Historic Places on April 22, 1993.
