= Henry House (Marion, Alabama) =

Historic house in Alabama, United States

- U.S. National Register of Historic Places
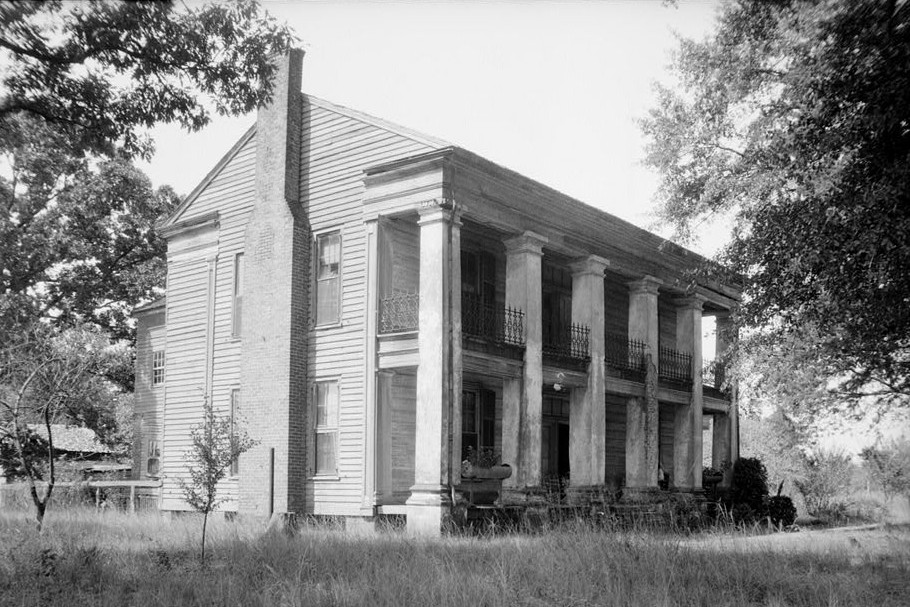
- The house as it appeared in 1935, when recorded by the Historic American Buildings Survey.

- Location within Alabama Location within the United States
- Location: S. Washington St., Marion, Alabama
- Coordinates: 32°36′36″N 87°19′6″W
- Area: 5.5 acres (2.2 ha)
- Built: 1840s
- Architectural style: Greek Revival
- NRHP reference No.: 86002744
- Added to NRHP: September 25, 1986

The Henry House, also known as the Lowry-Ford-Henry House, is a historic antebellum plantation house in Marion, Alabama, United States. Historians believe that the house was built during the 1840s for Squire Lowry, a wealthy planter originally from North Carolina. The two-story, L-shaped house is wood framed with a brick masonry foundation and columns. A monumentally scaled hexastyle portico spans the three-bay front facade. Another two-story, L-shaped portico spans the exposed half of the rear facade and one side of the two-story rear wing.

Bert Ford's family purchased the house from the Lowry family. It then passed to the Henry family, heirs of the Ford family. The last individual to own the house was Mary Katherine Blount, a native of Montgomery. She purchased the house and subsequently donated it to the Perry County Historical and Preservation Society. It was added to the National Register of Historic Places on September 25, 1986.
