= Kenworthy Hall =

Historic house in Alabama, United States

- U.S. National Register of Historic Places
- U.S. National Historic Landmark
- Alabama Register of Landmarks and Heritage
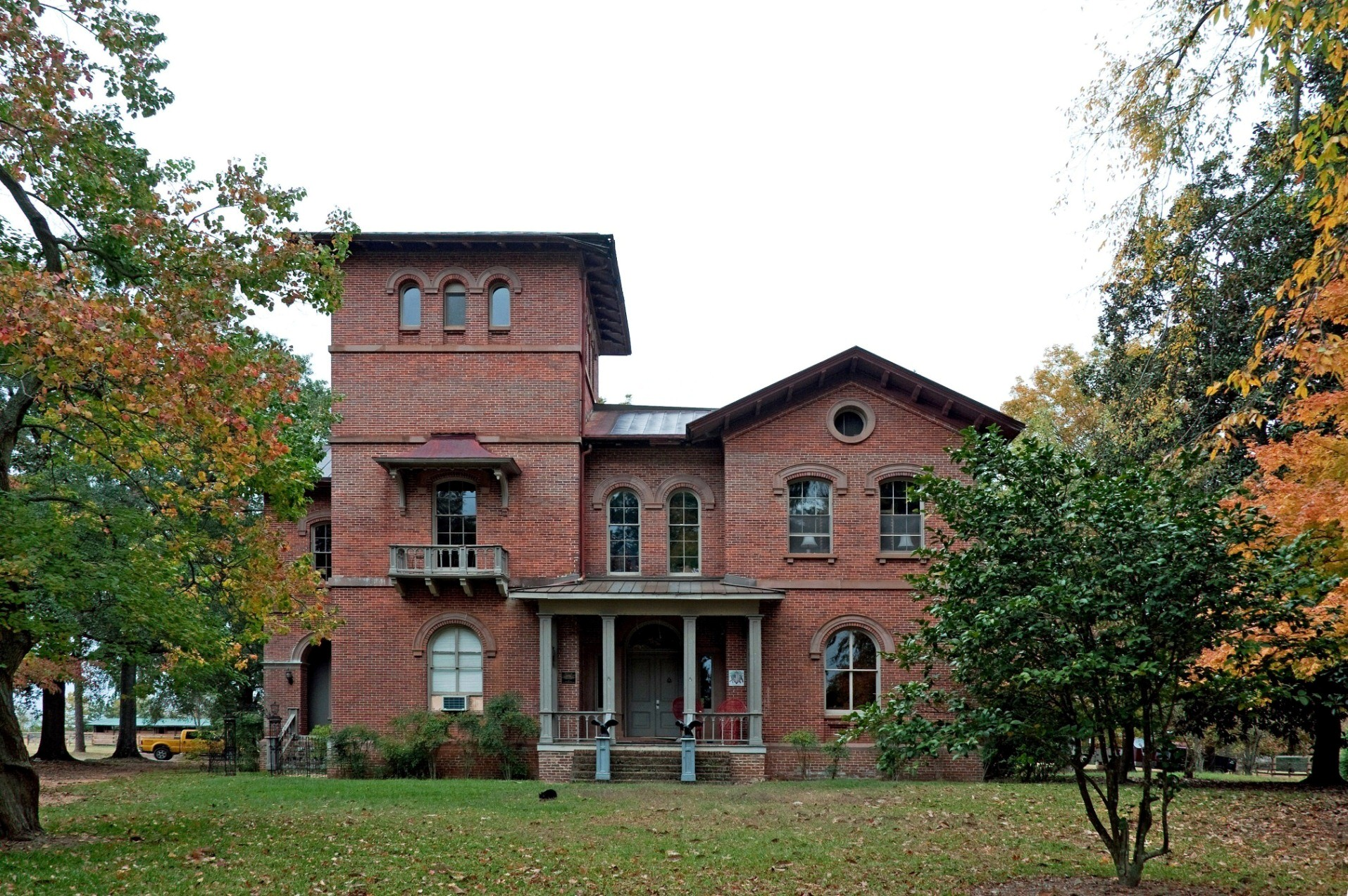
- The front elevation of Kenworthy Hall in 2011.

- Location within Alabama Location within the United States
- Location: near Marion, Alabama, United States
- Coordinates: 32°38′7″N 87°21′8″W
- Built: 1858-60
- Architect: Richard Upjohn and William Hart
- Architectural style: Italian Villa, Italianate
- NRHP reference No.: 90001318

Significant dates
- Added to NRHP: August 23, 1990
- Designated NHL: August 18, 2004
- Designated ARLH: December 15, 1989

Kenworthy Hall, also known as the Carlisle-Martin House, Carlisle Hall and Edward Kenworthy Carlisle House, is a plantation house located on the north side of Alabama Highway 14, two miles west of the Marion courthouse square. It was built from 1858 to 1860 and is one of the best preserved examples of Richard Upjohn's distinctive asymmetrical Italian villa style. It is the only surviving residential example of Upjohn's Italian villa style that was especially designed to suit the Southern climate and the plantation lifestyle. It has a massive four-story tower, windows of variable size and shape with brownstone trim, and a distinctly Southern division of family and public spaces. The building was designed and constructed for Edward Kenworthy Carlisle as his primary family residence and the centerpiece of his 440-acre (1.8 km^{2}) estate. It, along with some of its surrounding ancillary structures, was declared a National Historic Landmark in 2004. The house and a purported ghost are featured as a short story in Kathryn Tucker Windham's 13 Alabama Ghosts and Jeffrey.

== History ==
Edward Kenworthy Carlisle was born in 1810 near Augusta, Georgia. He migrated with his mother, Susan Curry Carlisle, to Perry County, Alabama as a young man. His mother had family members who were established cotton planters in the area. He married Lucinda Wilson Walthall in 1841. Carlisle eventually became a large landholder and also established himself as a cotton factor. In 1858 he decided to build an estate indicative of his family's Black Belt social standing. He first wrote to Upjohn on 4 May 1858 in a letter that stated "Desiring to build a house, a country residence, and at a loss for a plan, we address you as a well known Architect to ask you to draw us a plan, a rough sketch at first, which we hope may result in a suitable plan."

The plans for Kenworthy Hall evolved over the course of the next several months, with the plans continuing to be worked on through correspondence even as the brownstone trim, shipped from New York, began to arrive at the site. Carlisle had difficulty in finding labor skilled enough for such an ambitious house, but he finally found a master mason, Philip Bond, in November 1858 and work then commenced. Bond estimated that the brickwork would be completed by June 1859. The family had moved into the house by 1860.

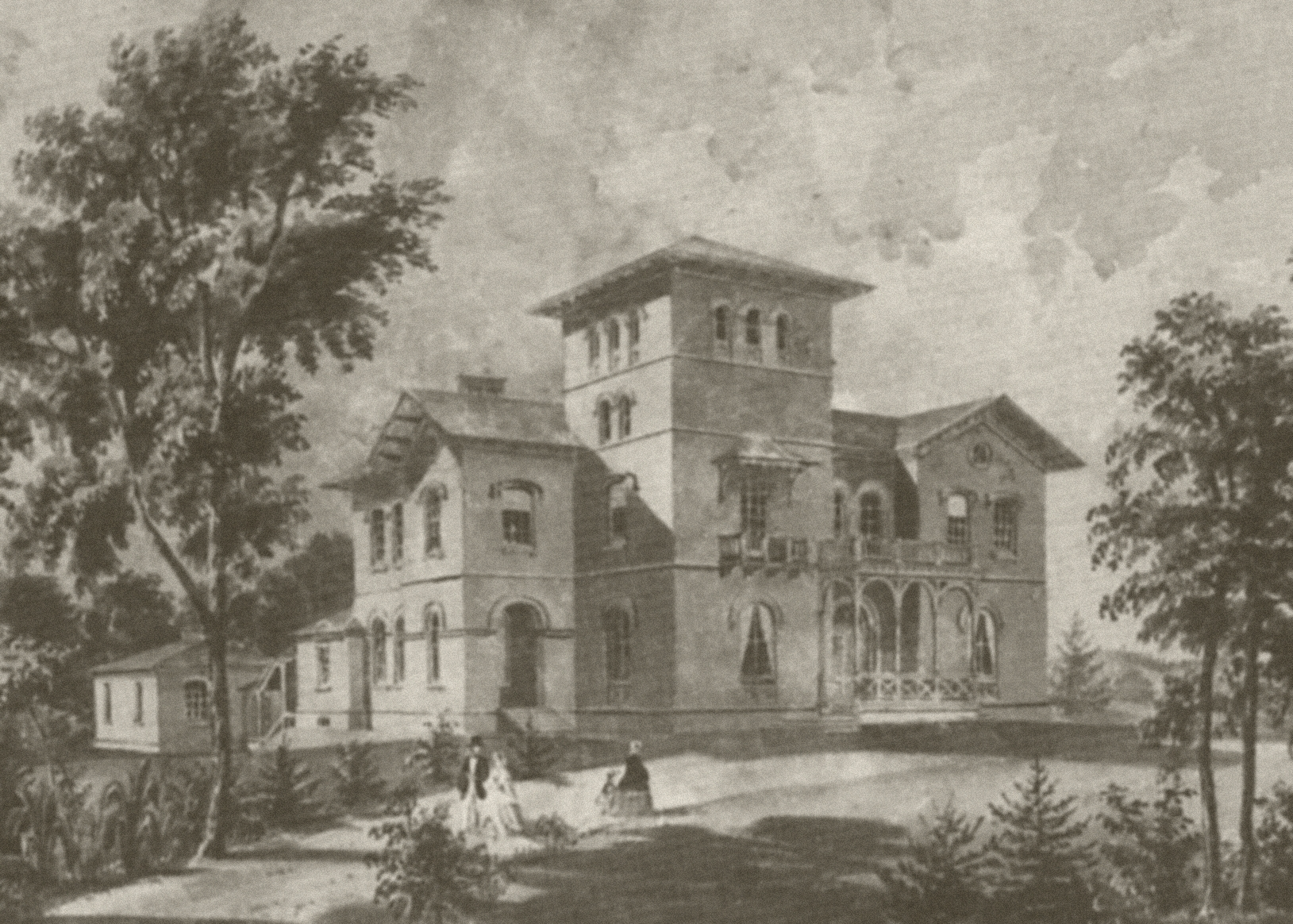
Architectural watercolor of Kenworthy Hall done in 1858 by Upjohn's firm. Note the design for the original front porch.

The American Civil War arrived in 1861 and Carlisle continued to have success in his many business ventures. One of his cotton trading firms, Carlisle and Humphries, actually saw profits increase during the Union blockade. His fortunes abruptly changed after the war, however, and his taxable property was valued at less than $20,000. The Kenworthy Hall property itself was valued at only $9000 in 1867. He entered into a business relationship in nearby Selma with his son, Edward Carlisle Jr., and his son-in-law, Alexander Jones. They went on to found the City National Bank in 1871. Carlisle then died in 1873, leaving the property to his wife, Lucinda, who divided her time between it and a home in Selma. She increasingly used Kenworthy as a summer residence only and gave it to her only surviving child, Augusta Carlisle Jones, in 1899.

Lucinda died in 1912 and in 1914 Augusta sold the property. The property went through a series of owners after that and went into a general decline. The house lost both of the original porches during this period. The house had various times that it stood vacant. The house was completely vacant for much of the 1950s and experienced a great deal of vandalism. It was at that time that the plasterwork was mutilated, many marble mantles were broken, and the stained glass destroyed, though it all had been partially documented by the Historic American Buildings Survey in 1934. During these various periods of vacancy the local population began to tell stories of the house being haunted and one of these stories was later recorded by Kathryn Tucker Windham in a short story entitled "The Faithful Vigil at Carlisle Hall," which she printed in her first book of ghost stories, 13 Alabama Ghosts and Jeffrey. The story involves the purported ghost of a young woman in the fourth floor tower room, who awaits the return of her lover.

The house and 19 acres (0.077 km^{2}) was purchased by Karen Klassen of Birmingham for $4000 in 1957 and for the next decade she did what she could to restore the house. In 1967 the Martin family bought the property and spent the next thirty years restoring it. The house was listed on the National Register of Historic Places in 1990 and the Historic American Buildings Survey spent the part of the summer in 1997 preparing drawings and taking new photographs. The Martins both died not long afterwards. The Martin heirs sold the house in 2001 to a new family. The house, along with four surviving ancillary structures, was declared a National Historic Landmark on August 18, 2004.

== Description ==
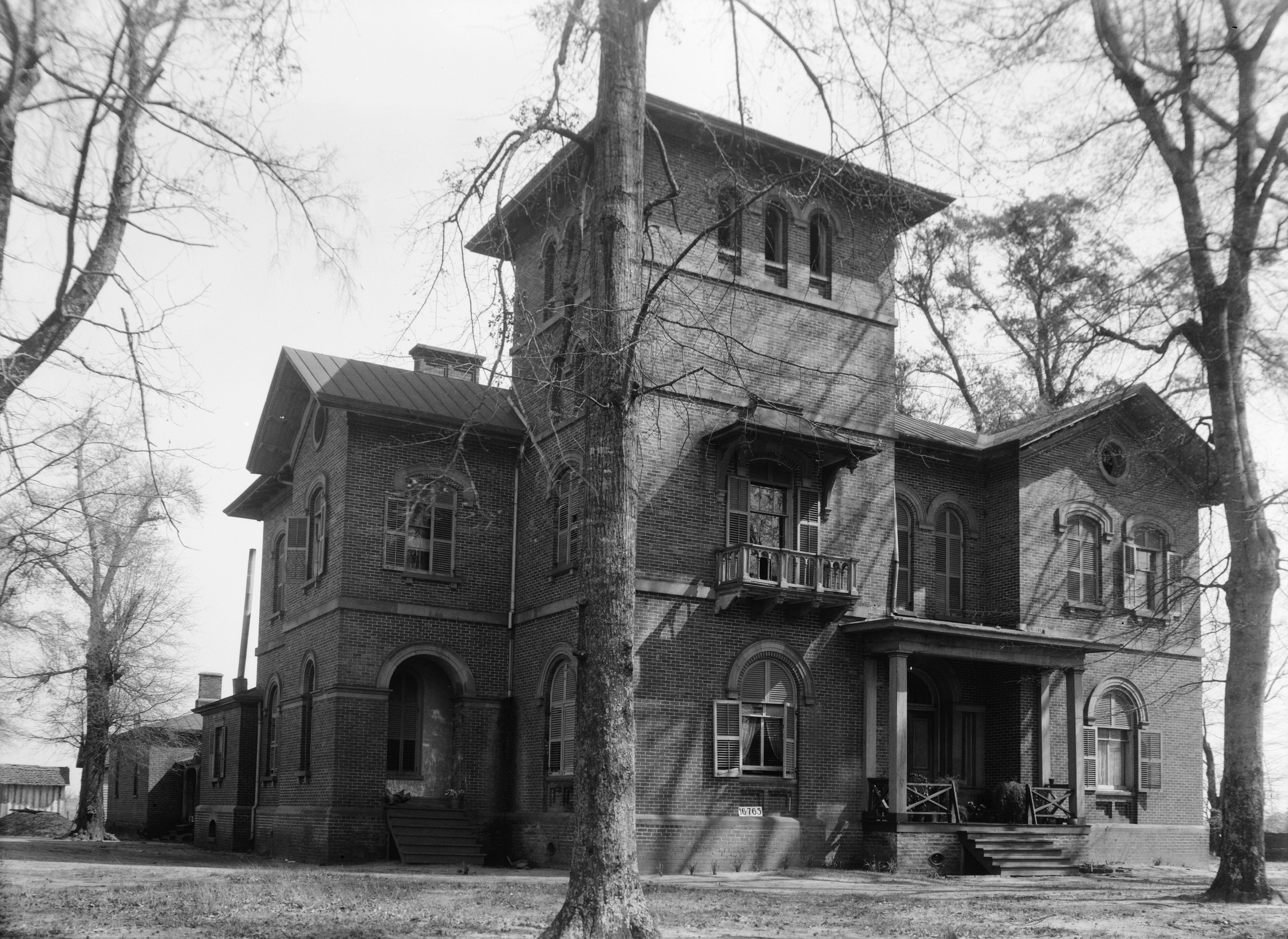
Front elevation of Kenworthy Hall in 1934.

Kenworthy Hall is closely related to a series of Italian villa style residences that Upjohn designed in the Atlantic Northeast, most notably the Edward King House in Newport, Rhode Island. But in this house Upjohn designed a residence adapted to a hot, humid climate and a plantation lifestyle. The most obvious adaptations were the wide cross hall at the rear of the main entrance hall, the detached kitchen, and the full width rear porch. Edward Carlisle's correspondence with Upjohn stressed that the house use the finest materials and the best construction. The house is built in brick, including the interior walls. The original standing-seam terne roof survives to the present. Kenworthy Hall features a partial basement, three separate stairways, three large hallways, seven major rooms on the first floor, six major rooms on the second floor, a large attic, a third floor tower room, and a fourth floor tower room. Ancillary structures that contribute to the National Historic Landmark status of the house include the detached two-room brick kitchen, a brick smokehouse, a partially buried brick water cistern, and a brick and wood well house. The house also originally had its own gas plant for gas lighting, though this is now marked only by a brick and brownstone platform.

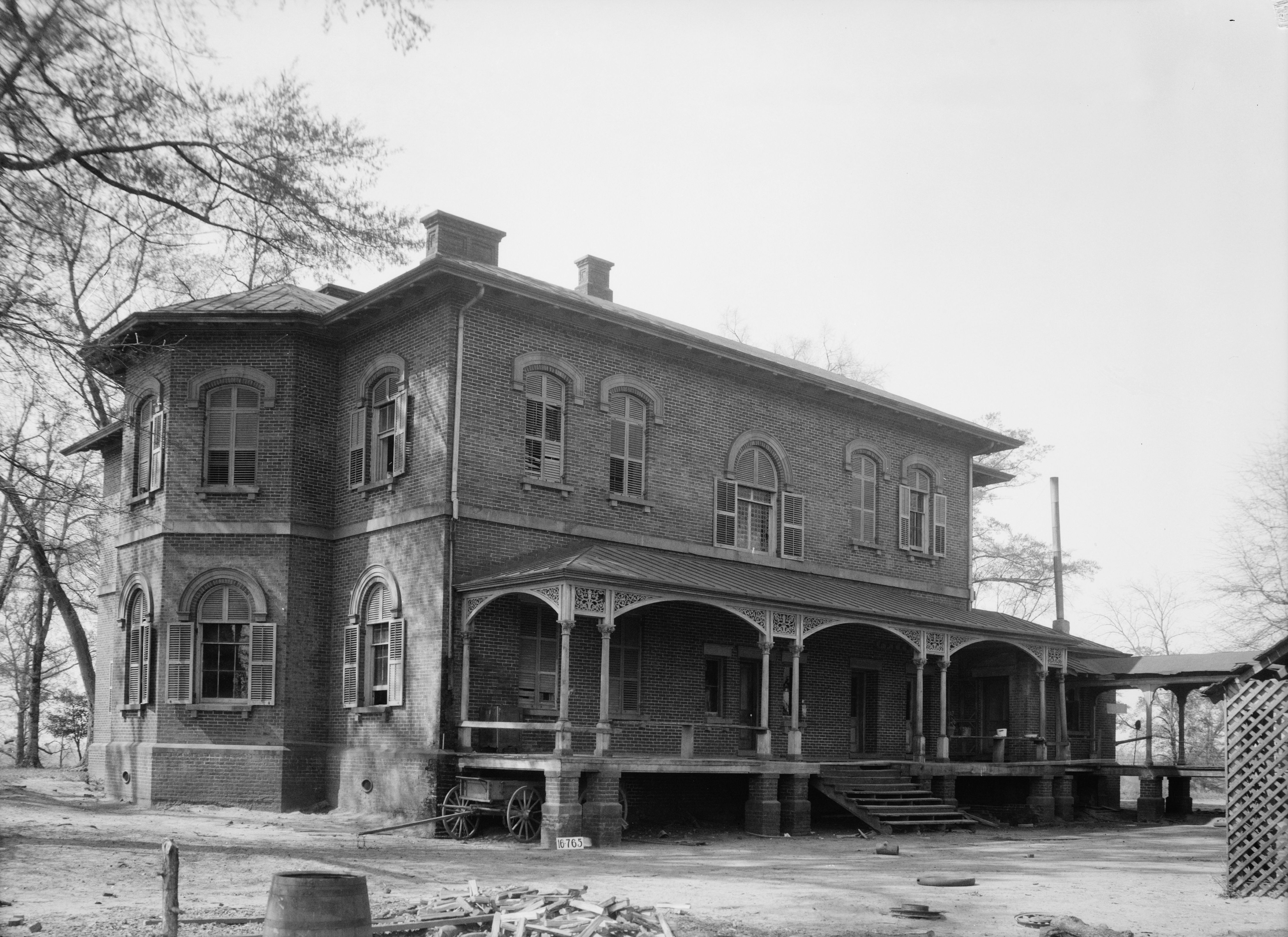
Rear elevation of Kenworthy Hall in 1934.

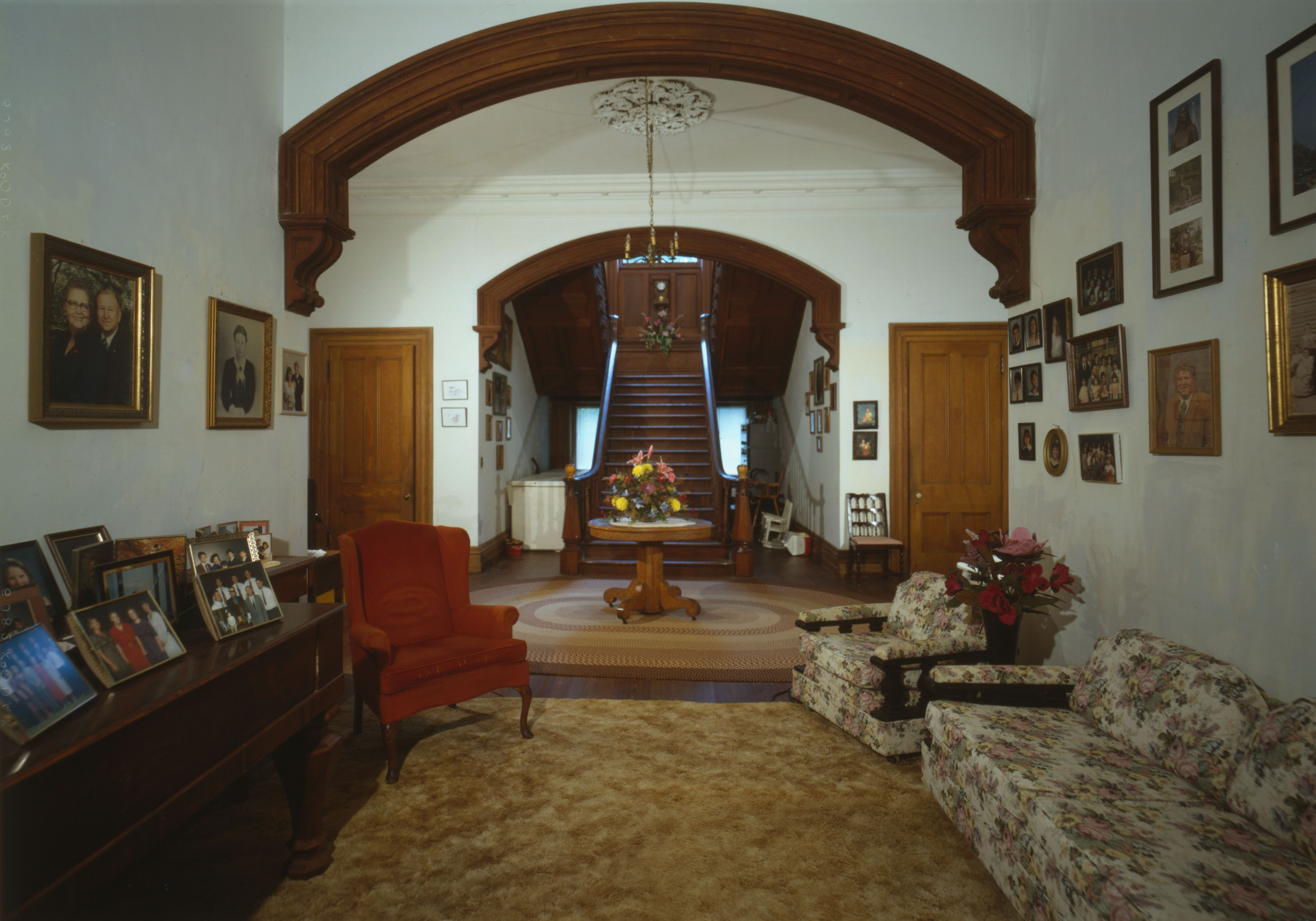
View of the entrance hall, a portion of the cross hall, and the main staircase.

The exterior walls of the house are built from a dull red brick that was locally made. The bricks are laid in a stretcher bond pattern, with belt courses of brownstone above the foundation and at each floor level. The windows on the house, all sixty-four of them, feature brownstone headers and windowsills. Most of them, except for those under the original first floor porches and in the kitchen building, feature round or segmental arches. Brick panels are inserted below the windowsills of the parlor, sitting room, and all twelve of the fourth-floor tower windows. The tower features a bracketed balcony at the second floor level, with a metal canopy roof. This type of balcony was a signature of Upjohn's Italian villa style. The roof is a low-pitched hipped and truncated structure with wide eaves. The eaves have an overhang of three feet and are decorated by flat wooden brackets. Two skylights, original to the house, are mounted on the flat portion of the roof. The roof also features four brick chimneys, capped with brownstone and serving twelve fireplaces.

The original porches, both originally referred to as piazzas, featured multiple arched wooden bays separated and supported by miniature Corinthian columns on pedestals. The front piazza was replaced by a far simpler structure after 1912, the rear one was taken down in the 1940s and was never rebuilt. Some of the components were stored at that time and have survived, with reconstruction contemplated by the current owners. The rear piazza originally connected to the detached kitchen by means of an elevated covered walkway, of a slightly simpler design than the piazzas. The main entrance doors are set into a Serliana brownstone arch. The doors are set under an arched glass fanlight with the sidelights placed in straight-topped transoms to either side. The front of the house also has a "family" entrance to the left of the tower, entered through a small arched loggia. The rear elevation has a centrally placed set of entry doors that enter the building behind the main staircase. The rear of the house also has an exterior service entry that opens into the servant's hallway and staircase.

An extensive use was made in the interior of decoratively carved cabinetry, oak moldings, decorative plasterwork, and one of the Deep South's first uses of ornamental stained glass. The stained glass is believed to have been produced by an early American ornamental stained glass company, that of Henry Sharp and Company of New York City. It was featured in the arched transom and sidelights of the main doors, as well as the large arched window over the main staircase landing. The glass was destroyed by vandals in the 1950s, as was many of the plasterwork ceiling medallions. The entire house has original 5-inch-wide (130 mm) heart pine floors.

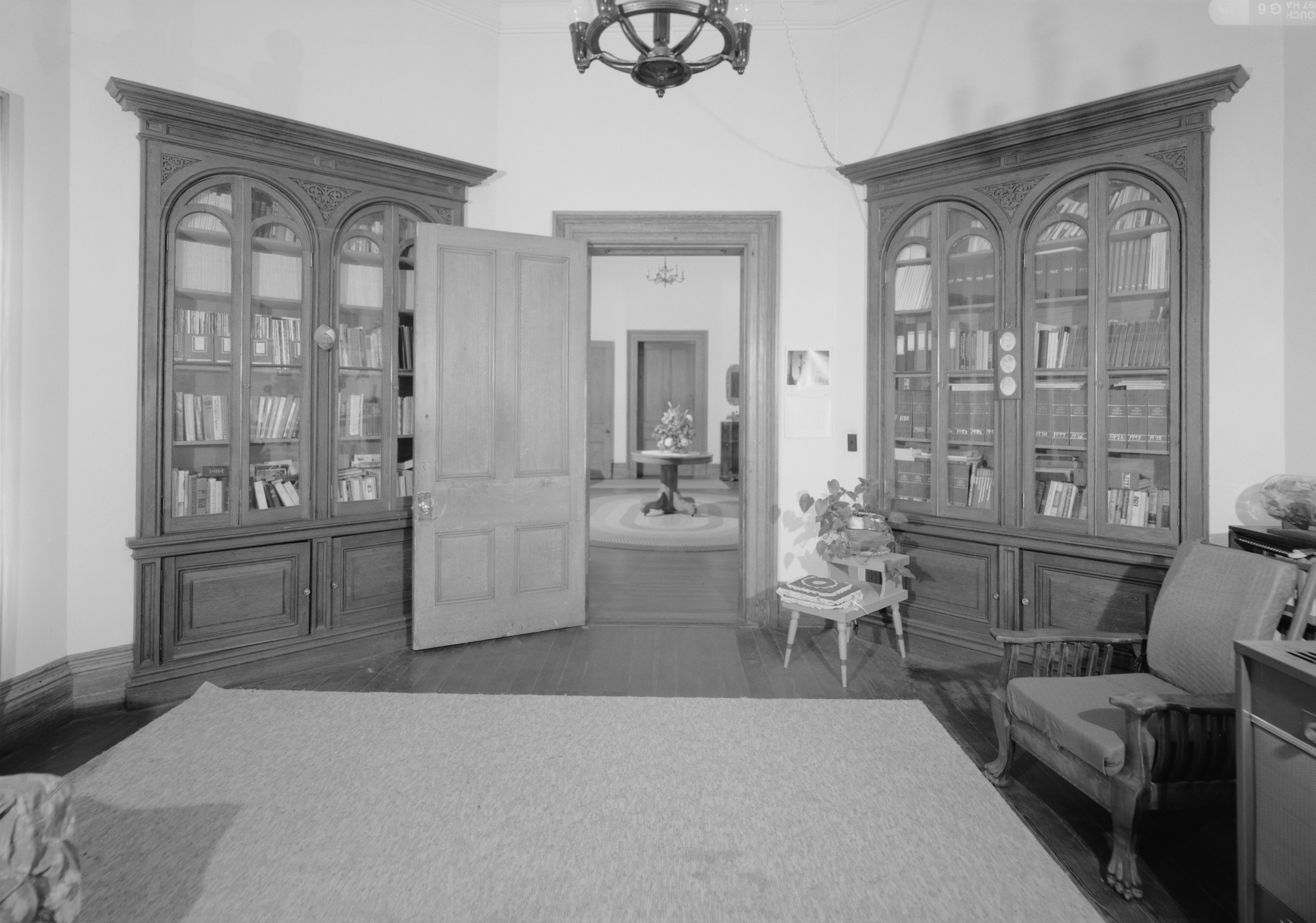
Built-in bookcases in the library.

The ground floor features a 26-foot-long (7.9 m) by 13-foot-wide (4.0 m) entrance hall that is joined to form a T-shape with a cross hall at the back measuring 13 feet wide and 27 feet long. The cross hall is centered on the main oak staircase. Both halls employ large ornamental oak arches to visually define the spaces. The parlor is entered from the right side of the entrance hall and has an ornate plasterwork cornice with a central ceiling medallion. It measures roughly 18 by 26 feet. The sitting room is across the hall on the left and measures 18 by 18 feet. The octagonal library is entered from the east end of the cross hall. The library is furnished by a pair of built-in arched bookcases, features an elaborately molded plasterwork cornice, and measures roughly 18 by 22 feet. The dining room is on the opposite end of the cross hall and is the same size as the parlor. Other rooms on this floor include the smoking room, sewing room, a large butler's pantry and adjacent storage room.

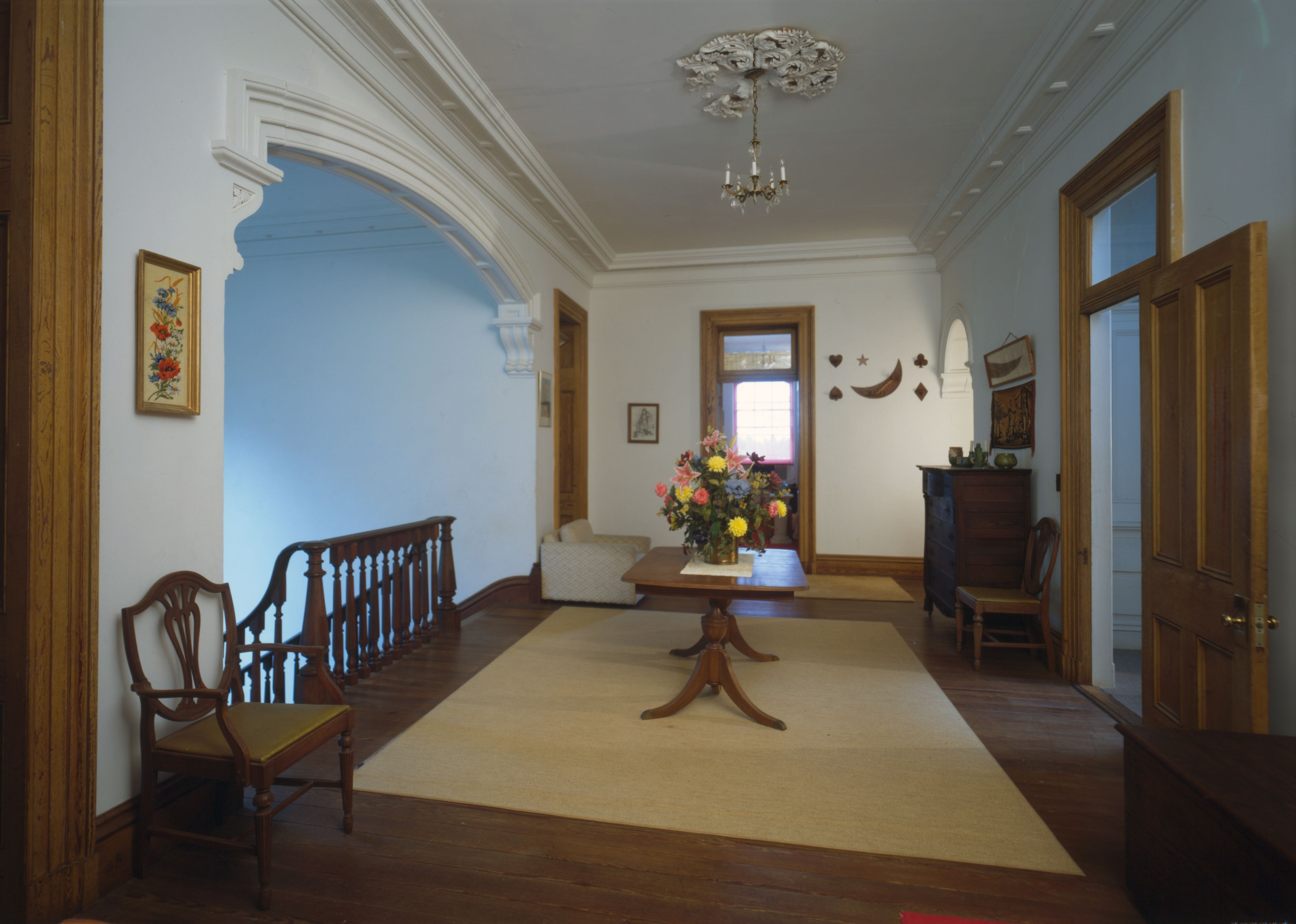
The upstairs cross hall.

In addition to the main staircase, there is a servant's hall with its own staircase and an elliptical family staircase just off of the family entrance. The second floor features a central cross hall that corresponds exactly to the one below. Around it are clustered an upstairs sitting room, five bedrooms, and a linen room. The upstairs sitting room has a small adjoining chamber and direct access to the servant's staircase. Two of the front bedrooms have large adjoining dressing rooms that are original to the plan. A large trunk room between the upstairs family hall and the two front bedrooms has been converted into a bathroom. The family staircase on this floor continues up to a landing that opens into a former servants room measuring roughly 19 by 19 feet on the third floor of the tower. This landing also has an entrance door into the attic. The fourth floor tower is accessed by a straight flight of stairs located just outside the servants room and the third floor landing. This room measures the same as the servant's room below and has three arched casement windows on each wall for a total of twelve.

== See also ==
- List of National Historic Landmarks in Alabama
- National Register of Historic Places listings in Perry County, Alabama
- Reportedly haunted locations in Alabama
