= Greene S. W. Lewis =

19th Century American politician

Greene Shadrach Washington Lewis was a leader among African Americans and a state legislator in Alabama during the Reconstruction era 1868–1876. He represented Perry County, Alabama.

The Montgomery Advertiser quoted him appealing for equal rights for African Americans as legislative fights in Alabama and the U.S. Congress developed. The paper and Democrats saw such Radical Republican proposals as a force to unite white voters against Republicans and their efforts to end segregation and discrimination.

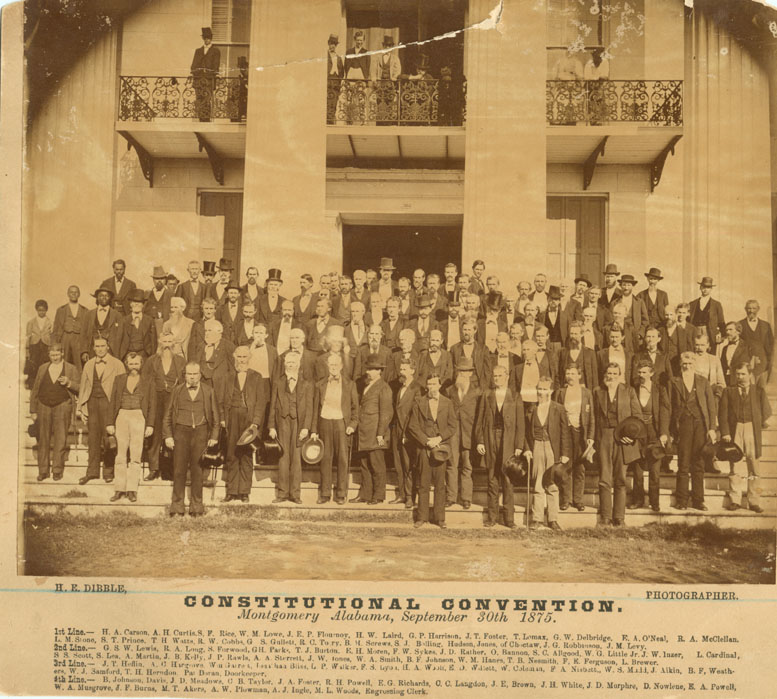
Delegates at the 1875 Alabama Constitutional Convention. Lewis is second from the left below Hugh A. Carson and Alexander H. Curtis at the top left

On March 4, 1873, he gave a speech addressing the civil rights bill before the house starting with a jab at the Democrats and demagogue Republicans who tried first to postpone the bill indefinitely.

The Livingston Journal published in Livingston, Alabama called for action from Democrats as it described a threat to large cotton belt landowners and claimed that in the last session of the house in 1874 Lewis called for the raising of taxes to a level high enough to force the large landowners to sell, enabling him and those like him to buy.

He was a Perry County, Alabama delegate to the 1875 Alabama Constitutional Convention. Greene was listed as a district delegate for the 1876 Republican National Convention.

== See also ==
- African American officeholders from the end of the Civil War until before 1900
