= Marion Courthouse Square Historic District =

Historic district in Alabama, United States

- U.S. National Register of Historic Places
- U.S. Historic district
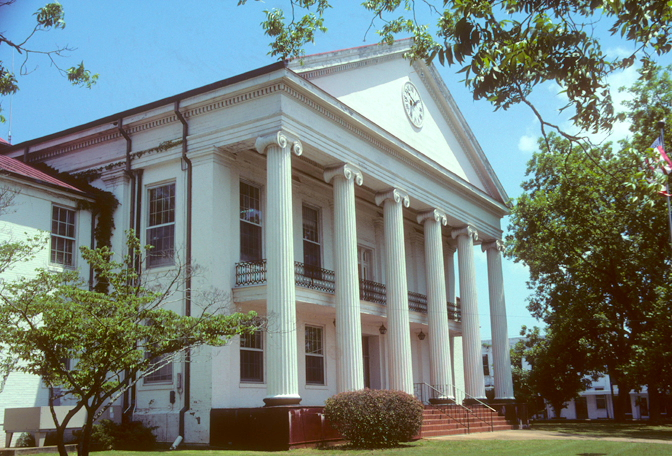
- The Perry County Courthouse

- Location within Alabama Location within the United States
- Location: Roughly, along Green, Washington, Jefferson, Jackson, Franklin, Clements, Centreville and Monroe Sts., Marion, Alabama
- Coordinates: 32°37′58″N 87°19′7″W
- Built: 1836
- Architect: B.F. Parsons, James Didlake
- Architectural style: Tudor Revival, Gothic, Greek Revival
- NRHP reference No.: 96000111
- Added to NRHP: February 16, 1996

The Marion Courthouse Square Historic District is a historic district in Marion, Alabama. It is centered on the Perry County Courthouse and includes examples of Greek Revival, Gothic Revival, and Tudor Revival architecture. The boundaries are roughly along Green, Washington, Jefferson, Jackson, Franklin, Clements, Centreville and Monroe Streets. It was added to the National Register of Historic Places on February 16, 1996.
