= Greene Street Historic District (Cumberland, Maryland) =

Historic district in Maryland, United States

- U.S. National Register of Historic Places
- U.S. Historic district
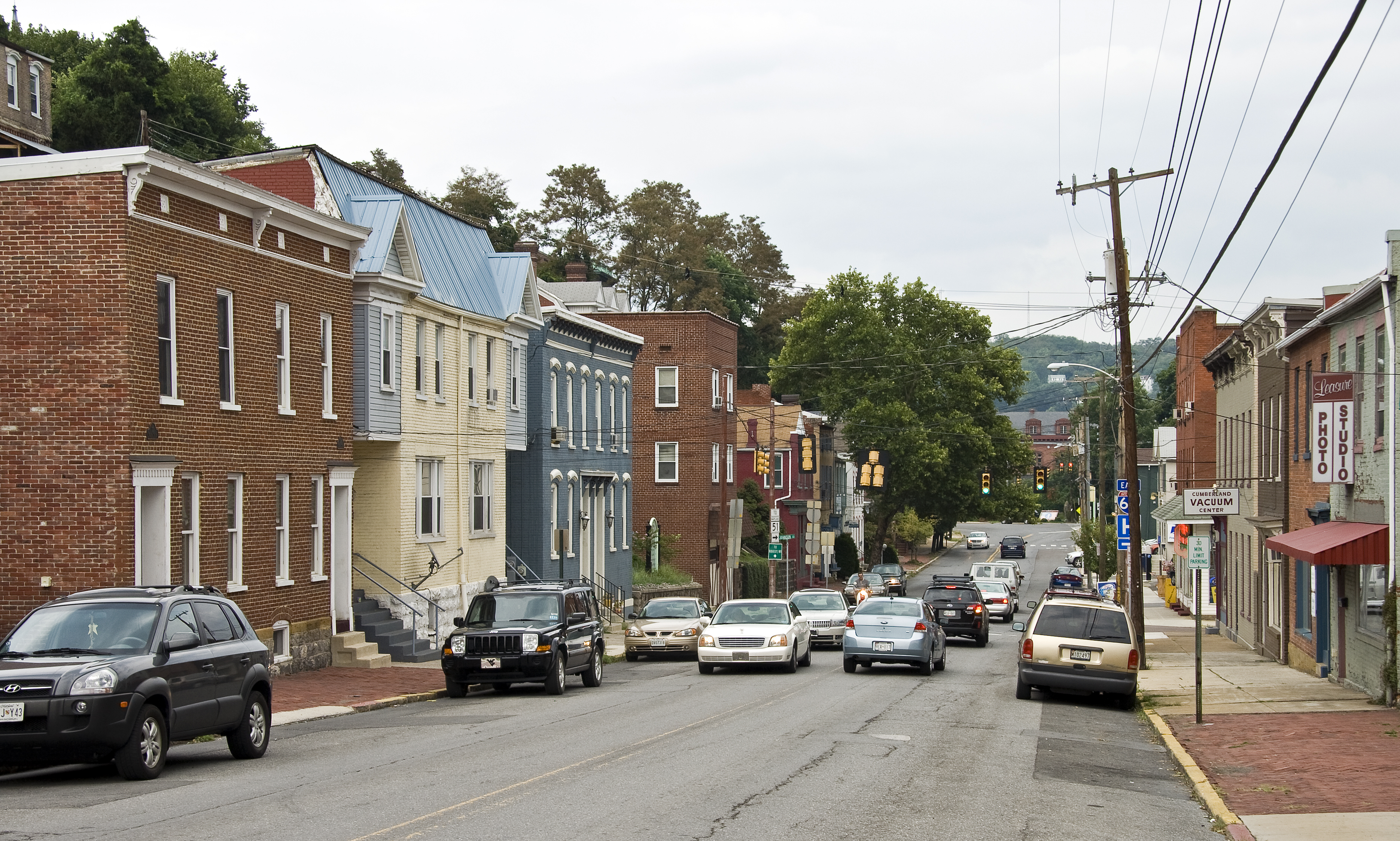

- Location within Maryland Location within the United States
- Location: Greene St. bet. Spruce Alley and Riverside Pk., Cumberland, Maryland
- Coordinates: 39°39′13″N 78°46′17″W
- Area: 7 acres (2.8 ha)
- Architect: Butler, Wright
- Architectural style: Greek Revival, Late Victorian
- NRHP reference No.: 05001482
- Added to NRHP: December 28, 2005

The Greene Street Historic District is a national historic district in Cumberland, Allegany County, Maryland. It is a 7-acre (28,000 m^{2}) linear historic district along both sides of Greene Street on the west side of Cumberland. It contains 45 buildings (44 are brick), 37 of which are residential and 8 of which exhibit commercial design characteristics. The earliest buildings in the district are built in the Federal style, followed by buildings erected in the Greek Revival, Italianate, Queen Anne, and Colonial Revival styles. The earliest of the district's resources was constructed about 1820, with the most recent built about 1930.

It was listed on the National Register of Historic Places in 2005.
