= First Congregational Church of Marion =

Historic church in Alabama, United States

- U.S. National Register of Historic Places
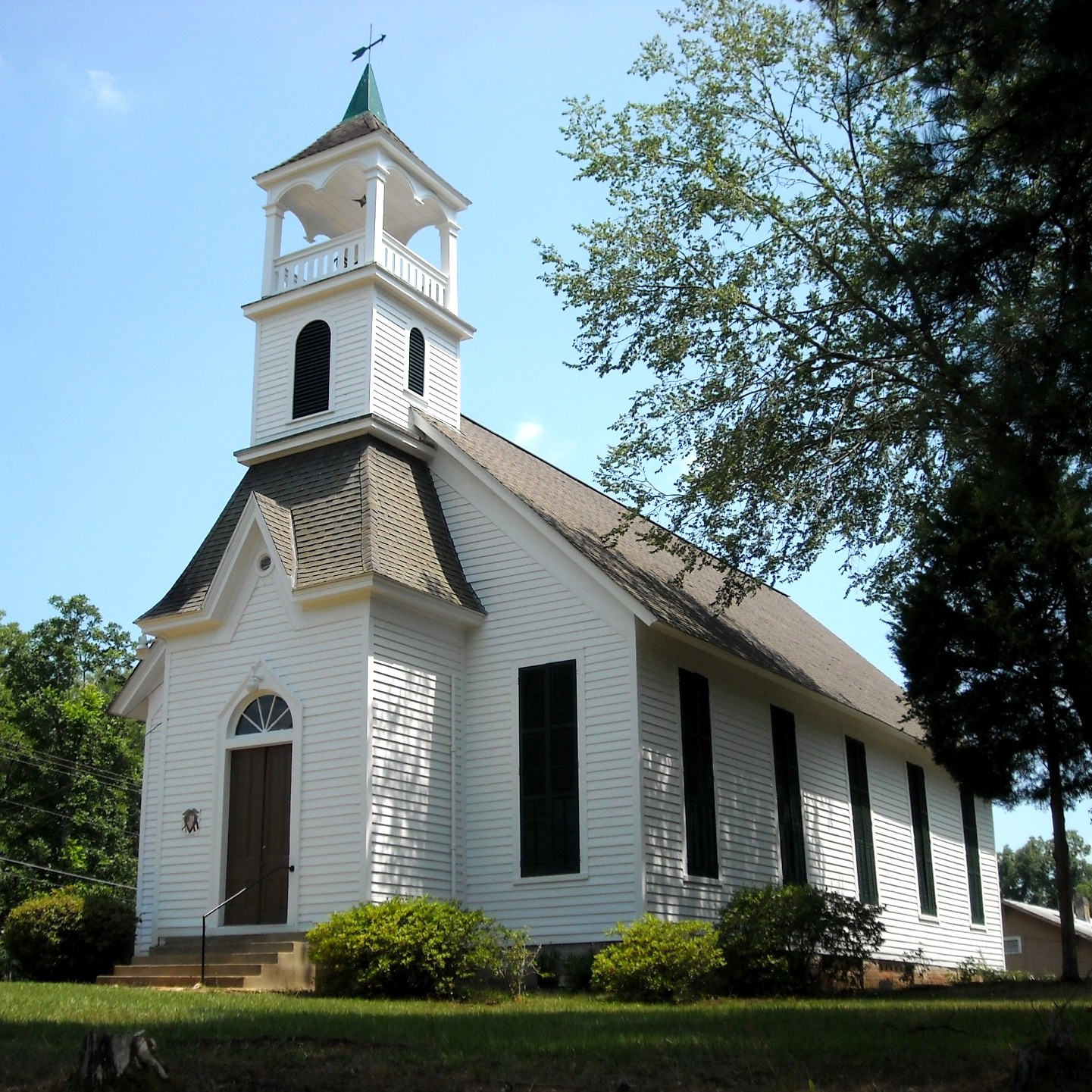

- Location within Alabama Location within the United States
- Location: 601 Clay St., Marion, Alabama
- Coordinates: 32°37′39″N 87°19′42″W
- Area: less than one acre
- Built: 1871
- NRHP reference No.: 82001614
- Added to NRHP: December 17, 1982

The First Congregational Church of Marion is a historic church at 601 Clay Street in Marion, Alabama. It was built in 1871 after the congregation was established in 1869 by freed slaves and the American Missionary Association. The congregation later became affiliated with the United Church of Christ in the 1950s. The building was added to the National Register of Historic Places in 1982. Idella Jones Childs was one of the people who helped get the building listed on the register.

== See also ==
- Historical Marker Database
