= Marion, Alabama =

City in Alabama, United States

Marion
- City
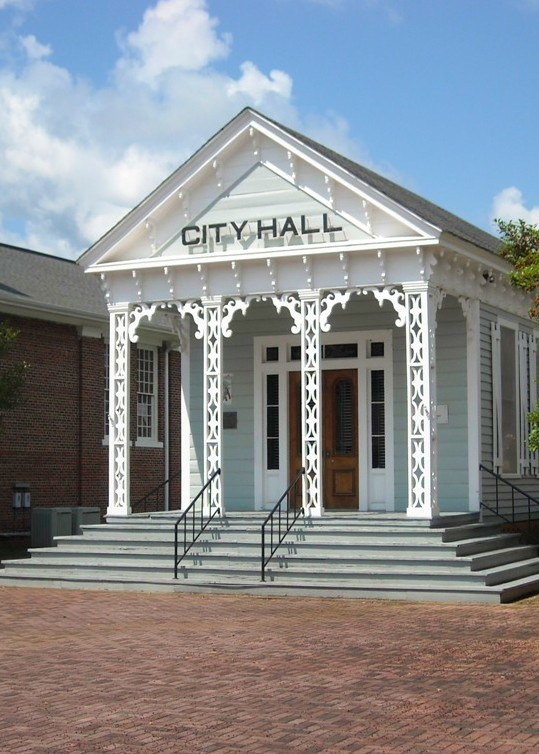
- Old Marion City Hall, built in 1832. It now houses the Alabama Military Hall of Honor.

- Location of Marion in Perry County, Alabama.
- Coordinates: 32°37′30″N 87°18′56″W
- Country: United States
- State: Alabama
- County: Perry
- Named for: Francis Marion

Government
  - Type: Mayor-Council

Area
  - Total: 10.66 sq mi (27.61 km^{2})
  - Land: 10.57 sq mi (27.37 km^{2})
  - Water: 0.089 sq mi (0.23 km^{2})
- Elevation: 361 ft (110 m)

Population (2020)
  - Total: 3,176
  - Density: 300.5/sq mi (116.02/km^{2})
- Time zone: UTC-6 (Central (CST))
  - Summer (DST): UTC-5 (CDT)
- ZIP code: 36756
- Area code: 334
- FIPS code: 01-46768
- GNIS feature ID: 2405020
- Website: www.cityofmarional.org

Marion is a city in and the county seat of Perry County, Alabama, United States. As of the 2020 census, Marion had a population of 3,176. First known as Muckle Ridge, the city was renamed for a hero of the American Revolution, Francis Marion.

Two colleges, Judson College and Marion Military Institute, are located in Marion. This is noted in the city's welcome sign referring to Marion as "The College City".

== History ==
=== Early history ===
Formerly the territory of the Creek Indians, Marion was founded shortly after 1819 as Muckle Ridge. In 1822 the city was renamed in honor of Francis Marion, the "Swamp Fox," hero of the American Revolutionary War. Marion incorporated as a town the same year and later became Perry County's second county seat as the hamlet of Perry Ridge was deemed unsuitable. In 1829 it upgraded from a town to a city. The old City Hall (1832) is but one of many antebellum public buildings, churches, and homes in the city today.

General Sam Houston, while between terms as 1st and 3rd president of the Republic of Texas, married Margaret Lea of Marion in the city in 1840.

At the 1844 meeting of the Alabama Baptist State Convention in Marion, the "Alabama Resolutions" were passed. This was one of the factors that led to the 1845 formation of the Southern Baptist Convention in Augusta, Georgia.

=== Founding of colleges ===
Judson College, a private, Baptist college for women, was founded in 1838 and closed July 31, 2021. Marion Military Institute was founded in 1842. as Howard College. Howard College moved to Birmingham in 1887, later becoming Samford University. The then President of Howard College, Colonel J. T. Murfee, LL.D., and a handful of faculty and students decided to remain in Marion, Alabama and immediately reorganized and founded Marion Military Institute, a military preparatory high school and college. It was modeled after Murfee's alma mater - Virginia Military Institute. Although built as a military college, H. O. Murfee, MMI's second president, believed that Marion was destined to become the "American Eton". Under his leadership, MMI achieved national recognition. President William Howard Taft served as President of the board of trustees. Then president of Princeton University, Woodrow Wilson was the guest speaker at the convocation for the class of 1905. However, the plan to pattern the school after Eton College was interrupted by World War I. The military nature of MMI was again emphasized due to the outbreak of the war. In 1916, United States Army ROTC program was first offered at MMI, when the institute was designated as an "Honor Military School with Distinction" by the United States Department of War. Marion Military Institute stands as the only remaining college in Marion, Alabama. A groundbreaking school for African Americans, the Lincoln Normal School, was founded here in 1867. The associated Lincoln Normal University for Teachers moved to Montgomery and became Alabama State University.

=== Pre-Civil War ===
In December 1857, Andrew Barry Moore (1807–1873) of Marion was elected the sixteenth governor of Alabama (1857–1861). He served one term, presiding over Alabama's secession from the Union. Assisting in the war effort, Moore was imprisoned a short time after the war and in ill health returned to Marion, where he died eight years later. George Doherty Johnson (May 30, 1832 – December 8, 1910) served as mayor of Marion in 1856, state legislator from 1857 to 1858 and rose to the rank of brigadier general in the Confederate States Army in the American Civil War.

=== Civil War era ===
Nicola Marschall (1829–1917), a German-American artist, is generally credited with designing both the first official Confederate flag and the grey Confederate army uniform while a teacher at the old Marion Female Seminary. With the coming Civil War in 1861, Nicola Marschall was approached in February by Mary Clay Lockett, wife of prominent attorney Napoleon Lockett of Marion, and her daughter, Fannie Lockett Moore, daughter-in-law of Alabama Governor Andrew B. Moore of Marion, to design a flag for the new Confederacy. Marschall offered three designs, one of which became the "Stars and Bars," the first official flag of the Confederate States of America (C.S.A.), first raised in Montgomery, Alabama, on March 4, 1861.

=== Early 20th century ===
At the turn of the century in 1900, Perry County peaked in population at 31,783. This is three times the population of the county in the 2010 census.

Hal Kemp, a jazz alto saxophonist, clarinetist, bandleader, composer and arranger was born in Marion in 1904 and died in Madera, California, following an auto accident in 1940. His band was very popular from 1934 until 1939. Major recordings in 1936 include "There's a Small Hotel" and "When I'm With You" both number one hits for two weeks. In 1937, his number one hits were "This Year's Kisses", which was number one for four weeks, and "Where or When", number one for one week. Other noted recordings were "Got a Date With an Angel" and "Three Little Fishies". In 1992, Hal Kemp was inducted into the Big Band and Jazz Hall of Fame.

Coretta Scott King, wife of Reverend Dr. Martin Luther King Jr., was born in Marion in 1927 and spent her childhood there. She graduated from Lincoln Normal School as valedictorian in 1945. The couple got married on the front lawn of her mother's home north of Marion in 1953.

=== Civil Rights era ===
A number of significant events occurred in Marion relating to the Civil Rights Movement. In 1958 Jimmy Wilson, a black man, was sentenced to death by a jury in Marion for stealing $1.95 from Estelle Barker. Wilson's case became an international cause célèbre, covered in newspapers worldwide and inspiring over 1000 letters per day to the office of governor Jim Folsom. Finally, after the Alabama Supreme Court upheld Wilson's conviction, at the urging of the Congress of Racial Equality, Secretary of State John Foster Dulles wrote to Folsom explaining the damage that the case was doing to the international reputation of the United States and Folsom quickly granted Wilson clemency.

In 1964, Marion was a center of civil rights protests in Alabama. During a Southern Christian Leadership Conference march on the evening of February 18, 1965, during the height of the Selma Voting Rights Movement, Marion resident Jimmie Lee Jackson was shot and killed by Alabama State Trooper James Bonard Fowler. These events were depicted in the 2014 film Selma. Jackson died on February 26 of an infection stemming from his wounds at nearby Good Samaritan Hospital in Selma. Martin Luther King Jr. preached a sermon at Jackson's funeral on March 3, and Jackson's death is recognized as the catalyst for James Bevel to call and organize the first Selma to Montgomery March on March 7. It was not until 2007 that Fowler was indicted for murder for his role in Jackson's death. In 2010, Fowler pleaded guilty to a lesser charge of manslaughter.

In 2018, the US Department of the Interior granted Beyond 50 Years – a community non-profit group in Marion – a $500,000.00 grant to convert the historic Perry County Jailhouse into a voting rights museum. The historic jailhouse was the location of Reverend James Orange's incarceration, which sparked the 1965 march that resulted in the death of Jimmie Lee Jackson. The jail is currently under renovation for the conversion into a museum, however a grand opening date has not yet been announced.

=== Recent events ===
In 2009, Marion made national news when a three-year-old family feud turned into a 150-man riot outside the town's city hall resulting in the arrest of eight people and the hospitalization of two.

In early 2016, the New York Times reported the city was the center of an outbreak of tuberculosis. In 2014–15 twenty people in the area had contracted active cases of the disease and three had died.

== Historical structures ==
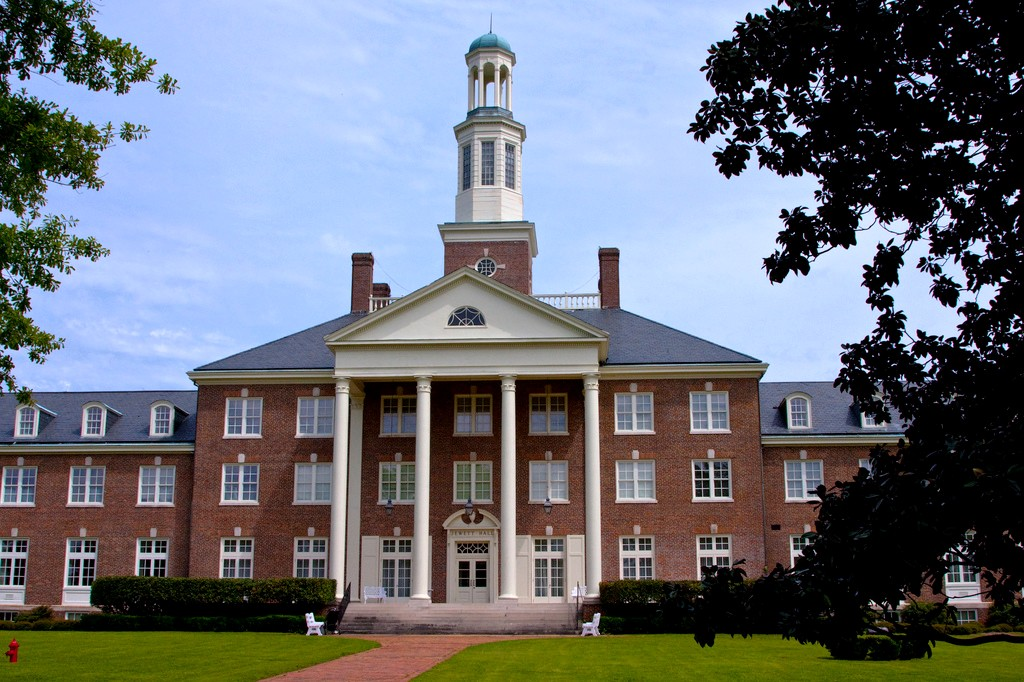
Jewett Hall at Judson College, part of the Judson College Historic District.

Marion has many historic structures, with most listed on historic registers directly or as contributing buildings. The Chapel and Lovelace Hall at Marion Military Institute, First Congregational Church of Marion, the Henry House, Marion Female Seminary, Phillips Memorial Auditorium, President's House at Marion Institute, Siloam Baptist Church are all individually listed on the National Register of Historic Places. It has one National Historic Landmark, Kenworthy Hall. The city also has several historic districts, including the Green Street Historic District, Judson College Historic District, Marion Courthouse Square Historic District, and West Marion Historic District. Historic district buildings of special significance include examples such as Reverie.

== Geography ==
According to the U.S. Census Bureau, the city has a total area of 10.7 square miles (28 km^{2}), of which 10.6 square miles (27 km^{2}) is land and 0.1 square miles (0.26 km^{2}) (0.94%) is water.

== Demographics ==
Historical population
Census	Pop.	Note	%±
1850	1,544		—
1860	1,408		−8.8%
1870	2,646		87.9%
1880	2,074		−21.6%
1890	1,982		−4.4%
1900	1,698		−14.3%
1910	1,834		8.0%
1920	2,035		11.0%
1930	2,141		5.2%
1940	2,382		11.3%
1950	2,822		18.5%
1960	3,807		34.9%
1970	4,289		12.7%
1980	4,467		4.2%
1990	4,211		−5.7%
2000	3,511		−16.6%
2010	3,686		5.0%
2020	3,176		−13.8%
U.S. Decennial Census; 2013 Estimate

=== 2020 census ===
As of the 2020 census, Marion had a population of 3,176. The median age was 35.0 years. 19.2% of residents were under the age of 18 and 18.1% of residents were 65 years of age or older. For every 100 females there were 95.8 males, and for every 100 females age 18 and over there were 93.7 males age 18 and over.

0.0% of residents lived in urban areas, while 100.0% lived in rural areas.

There were 1,115 households in Marion, of which 32.5% had children under the age of 18 living in them. Of all households, 26.8% were married-couple households, 21.1% were households with a male householder and no spouse or partner present, and 47.6% were households with a female householder and no spouse or partner present. About 35.6% of all households were made up of individuals and 14.8% had someone living alone who was 65 years of age or older. There were 407 families in the city.

There were 1,290 housing units, of which 13.6% were vacant. The homeowner vacancy rate was 2.7% and the rental vacancy rate was 7.6%.

Marion racial composition
Race	Num.	Perc.
White (non-Hispanic)	859	27.05%
Black or African American (non-Hispanic)	2,186	68.83%
Native American	6	0.19%
Asian	10	0.31%
Pacific Islander	1	0.03%
Other/Mixed	62	1.95%
Hispanic or Latino	52	1.64%

=== 2010 census ===
As of the census of 2010, there were 3,686 people, 1,184 households, and 819 families residing in the city. The population density was 331.8 inhabitants per square mile (128.1/km^{2}). There were 1,418 housing units at an average density of 134.0 per square mile (51.7/km^{2}). The racial makeup of the city was 63.9% Black or African American, 32.9% White, 0.26% Native American, 0.09% Asian, 0.09% Pacific Islander, 0.26% from other races, and 0.60% from two or more races. 1.9% of the population were Hispanic or Latino of any race.

There were 1,184 households, out of which 31.4% had children under the age of 18 living with them, 38.8% were married couples living together, 25.3% had a female householder with no husband present, and 30.8% were non-families. 28.9% of all households were made up of individuals, and 12.6% had someone living alone who was 65 years of age or older. The average household size was 2.57 and the average family size was 3.17.

In the city, the population was spread out, with 27.5% under the age of 18, 15.7% from 18 to 24, 21.5% from 25 to 44, 18.7% from 45 to 64, and 16.6% who were 65 years of age or older. The median age was 30.7 years. For every 100 females, there were 80.7 males. For every 100 females age 18 and over, there were 72.9 males.

The median income for a household in the city was $24,142, and the median income for a family was $29,663. Males had a median income of $27,422 versus $20,240 for females. The per capita income for the city was $11,934. About 28.4% of families and 33.4% of the population were below the poverty line, including 51.3% of those under age 18 and 15.1% of those age 65 or over.

== Notable people ==
- Lee Cooke, fifty-first Mayor of Austin, Texas
- Alexander H. Curtis (1829–1878), Reconstruction era Black politician
- James Webb Curtis (1856–1921), Black physician, and volunteer military personnel in the Spanish–American War
- Pauline E. Dinkins (1891–1961), Black physician born in Marion
- T. J. Goree (1835–1905), Confederate Lieutenant and aide to Lt. General James Longstreet
- Byron Gunner (1857–1922), American minister and activist; born and raised in Marion
- Margaret Lea Houston (1819–1867), third wife of Sam Houston
- Jimmie Lee Jackson (1938–1965), civil rights activist whose death inspired the Selma to Montgomery marches
- Hal Kemp, jazz bandleader, musician, arranger, and composer
- Coretta Scott King (1927–2006), civil rights activist and wife of Martin Luther King Jr.
- Porter King, thirty-fourth Mayor of Atlanta, Georgia
- Willie McClung (1930–2002), former NFL offensive lineman
- Walthall M. Moore, politician and the first African American to serve in the Missouri state legislature
- Jimmy Wilson, robber whose case received national attention
