= Green Street Historic District (Marion, Alabama) =

Historic district in Alabama, United States

- U.S. National Register of Historic Places
- U.S. Historic district
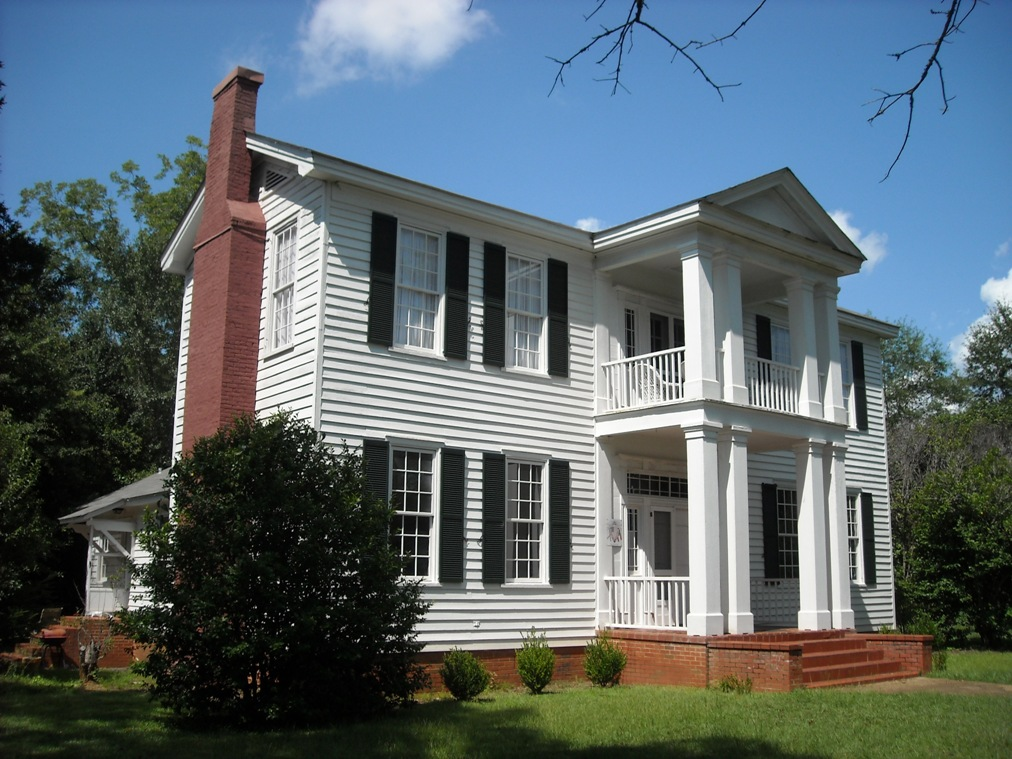
- Home of former governor Andrew B. Moore on Green Street.

- Location within Alabama Location within the United States
- Location: 203-751 W. Green St., Marion, Alabama
- Coordinates: 32°38′0″N 87°19′28″W
- Area: 45 acres (18 ha)
- Architectural style: Craftsman, Greek Revival, Federal
- NRHP reference No.: 79000400
- Added to NRHP: May 30, 1979

The Green Street Historic District is a historic district in Marion, Alabama. It is centered on West Green Street and includes examples of American Craftsman, Greek Revival, and Federal style architecture. It contains 33 structures, dating from the mid-1830s to the present, with 24 of them listed as contributing buildings. It was added to the National Register of Historic Places on May 30, 1979.

The district is architecturally important for its fine collection of antebellum homes, including 12 in the transitional Federal-Greek Revival style and one early example of the Gothic Revival. One structure, the Andrew Barry Moore House is listed on the Historic American Buildings Survey. Of the remaining contributing structures, two modest Victorian homes date from the late 19th century and nine Bungalow-influenced homes date from the early 20th century.

The district is bounded on the east by downtown Marion, on the north by more recent residential structures, and on the west by rural countryside. The street which runs parallel to Green on the south contains additional architecturally significant structures, but they do not fit into the district because of their physical separation from Green Street. The clustering of homes along Green Street and the general lay of the land visually prescribe the district boundaries. Green Street forms a well-defined neighborhood district containing one- and two-story homes. The distance of the houses from the street and the size of the lots generally increases toward the western end of the district, away from town. The prominent building material is wood, being found on almost three-fourths of the structures. Six structures have brick exteriors, two have concrete block, and one stucco. The tree-lined street is the major western approach to the city, the only main artery which has been able to avoid commercialization.

The district has been categorized into five distinct groups according to the dates of construction. The most significant group is the 13 antebellum homes which comprise 39.3% of the district structures. Seven of these retain a strong degree of period character with virtually no structural changes. Of the six that have been altered, three were given a Victorian treatment in the late 19th century, two were given Bungaloid facades in the early 20th century, and one was recently altered by the enclosure of the portico and addition of a bay window. Of the remaining contributing structures, the two Victorian period homes and the nine early 20th century bungalows, are modest examples of their period styles and have been maintained very close to their original condition. The last two categories contain the nine structures which were built after 1930. however, intrude to a slight or moderate degree.

The Green Street Historic District, located on a half- mile stretch along the major western approach to the city of Marion, include twelve significant examples of Federal and Greek Revival style homes and an unusually early example of the Gothic Revival. In addition to being architecturally important, these structures are primary indicators of the lifestyles of the Black Belt planter class during the prosperous antebellum period. One of them, the Andrew Barry Moore House, is listed on the Historic American Buildings Survey. Interspersed among the pre-Civil War homes is a fine collection (9 structures) of early 20th century bungalows, as well as several modest recent structures. As a whole, the district depicts the ongoing attractiveness of Green Street as one of the city's most prestigious residential areas. Marion, the county seat of Perry County, is located in the fertile Black Belt Region of west central Alabama. Under the 1814 Treaty of Fort Jackson, the area was ceded to the federal government by the Creek Indians. Squatters and prospectors moved in until the land was put up for sale in 1817. A boom period began in the early 1830s, when farmers realized that the sticky soil was extraordinarily adaptable to the cultivation of cotton. Ultimately, production of that crop led the region to a position of economic importance in the antebellum years which it has never surpassed. Settled in 1817 and named the first permanent county seat in 1822, Marion soon emerged as the principal city of Perry County. With the influx of cotton planters to the area, the town's economy boomed from the late 1830s to the onset of the Civil War. Its location on a high, red clay rise provided a solid, dry ground for settlement which many planters preferred to the dampness and mud of the surrounding farmlands. Increasing educational, economic, and political opportunities attracted prominent men of many professions to the young community. Green Street, one of the city's earliest traffic arteries, was a popular building location during the pre-Civil War years, and 13 antebellum structures remain. The typical upper-middle class residence was a modest frame house with Greek Revival ornament and often a retention of Federal Period scaling. Homes such as the Italianate-detailed Magnolia Hill and the Gothic Revival Howze-Woodfin House were unusually elaborate for this area.

Early residents of the district included leaders in various professions. The Governor Andrew Barry Moore House was the home of the state's 16th chief executive. While governor, Moore issued the proclamation calling for the Alabama Secession Convention in 1861. The presiding officer of the convention, Judge William Macklin Brooks, lived in the Brooks-Bailey House. A prominent Marion merchant, Mark A. Myatt, built his home on Green Street around 1845. Magnolia Hill was built in 1847 by the wealthy landowner King Parker and sold in 1866 to Archibald John Battle, President of Judson College (one of three antebellum colleges in Marion). The development of Green Street in the years following the Civil War reflects the changes in the economy of the Black Belt region. Virtually no construction took place during the immediate post-war years, and only two modest Victorian homes were added in the late 19th century. With the increasing prosperity in the early 20th century, a new building boom began on Green Street. The nine structures built between 1915 and 1930 are, for the most part, simple, one-story frame bungalows. They are important in depicting the popular architectural style of the period, as well as in showing the drastic changes in the lifestyles of Marion residents since the more prosperous antebellum years. Of the nine additional structures built since 1930, six retain the flavor of the earlier bungalows and blend well into the district. Three intrude, however, but they do not destroy the visual integrity of the district. The Nunnally House is similar in size and scale to the bungalows, but its style and location near the front of the lot make it intrude to a slight degree. Two structures, the Madison Tucker House and Apartment, are moderately intrusive in view of their irregular scaling, contemporary styling, and situation on the edge of the lot. In spite of these modern structures, the district retains the character of a mid-19th century residential area.

== Structures in the district ==
1. Harris House (214 Green Street): c. 1930
2. Lea–Thatcher House (302 Green Street): before 1834
3. Moore–Drew House (304 Green Street): c. 1845
4. Drew House (306 Green Street): c. 1930
5. Myatt–Knudsen House (308 Green Street): c. 1845
6. Nichols House (312 Green Street): c. 1930
7. Horne House (402 Green Street): c. 1915
8. Horne House (404 Green Street): c. 1890
9. Victor Tubbs House (408 Green Street): c. 1920
10. Brooks–Bailey House (506 Green Street): c. 1850
11. Governor A. B. Moore House (508 Green Street): c. 1832
12. Moore–Williams House (751 Green Street): c. 1840
13. Boise Tubbs Rental House (513 Green Street): c. 1920
14. Boise Tubbs House (511 Green Street): c. 1920
15. Seawell House (509 Green Street): c. 1840
16. Washburn House (501 Green Street): c. 1890
17. Magnolia Hill (409 Green Street): 1847
18. Howze–Woodfin House (405 Green Street): c. 1850
19. Underwood House (309 Green Street): c. 1850
20. Hudson–Crew House (307 Green Street): c. 1855
21. Pope House (301 Green Street): c. 1835
22. Eagle Hotel (207 Green Street): c. 1835
23. Clinton House (205 Green Street): c. 1925
24. Yeager House (203 Green Street): c. 1930
