= Festivals in Atlanta =

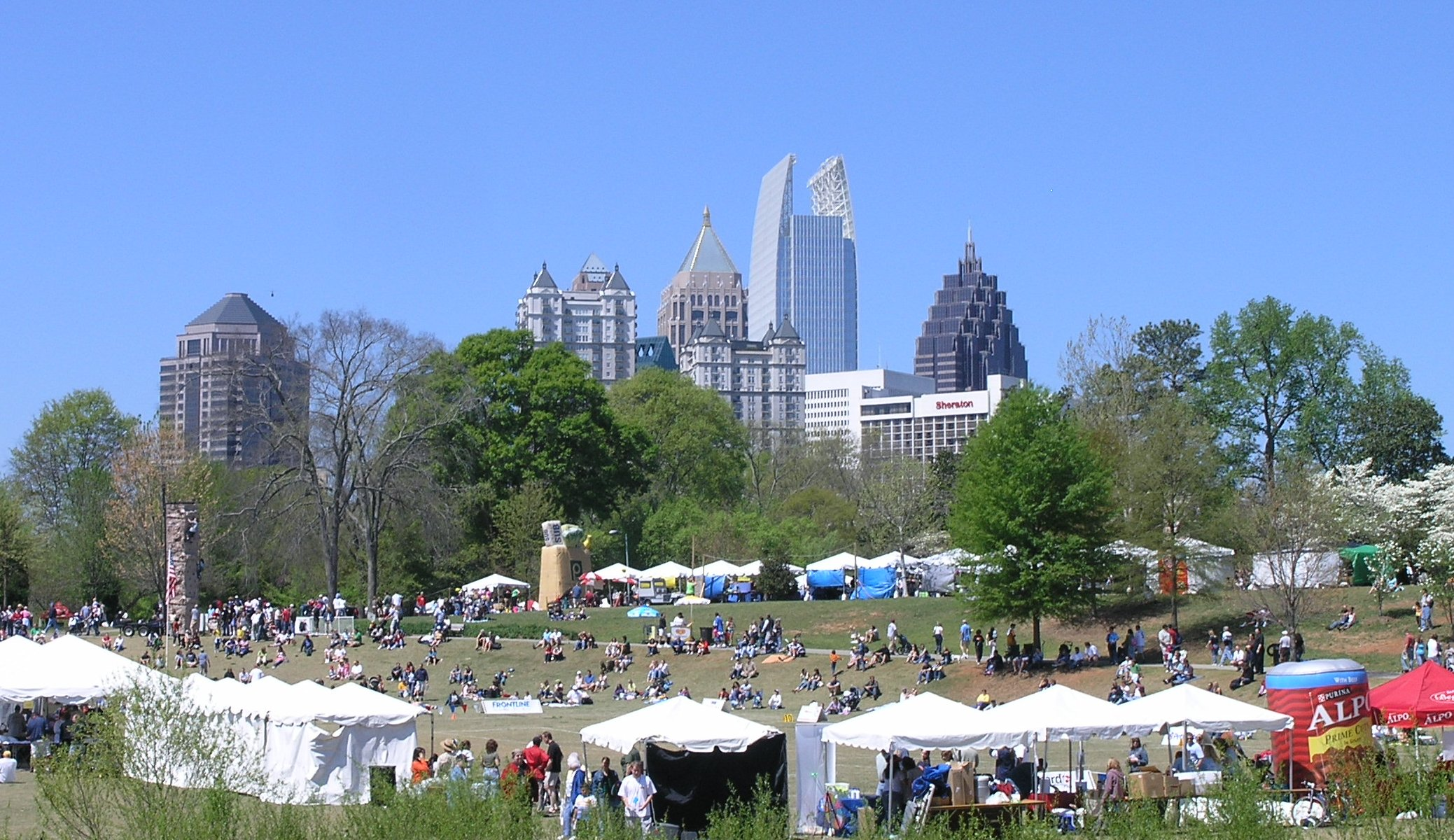
The annual Atlanta Dogwood Festival, held in Piedmont Park

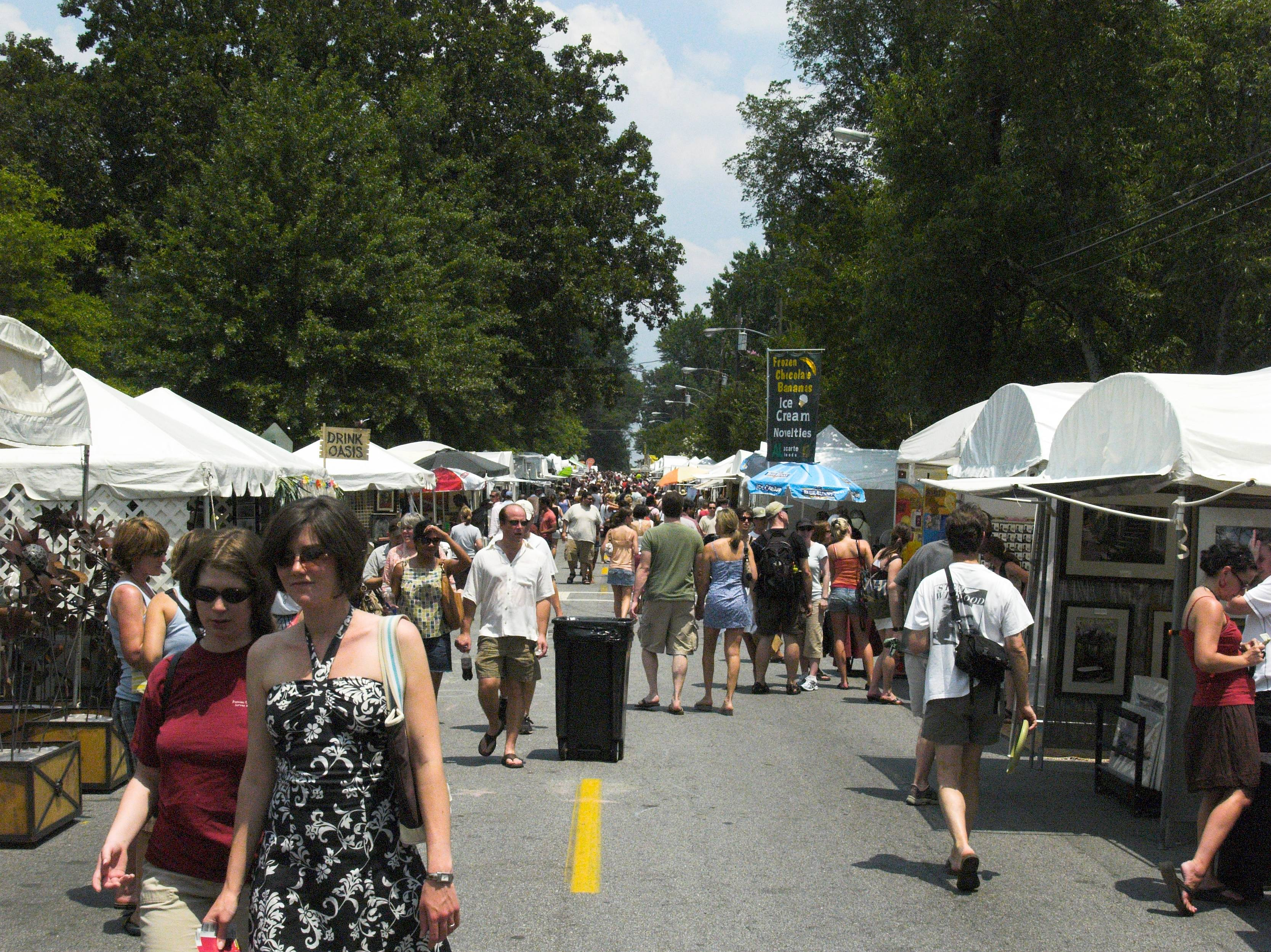
Virginia Highland Summerfest

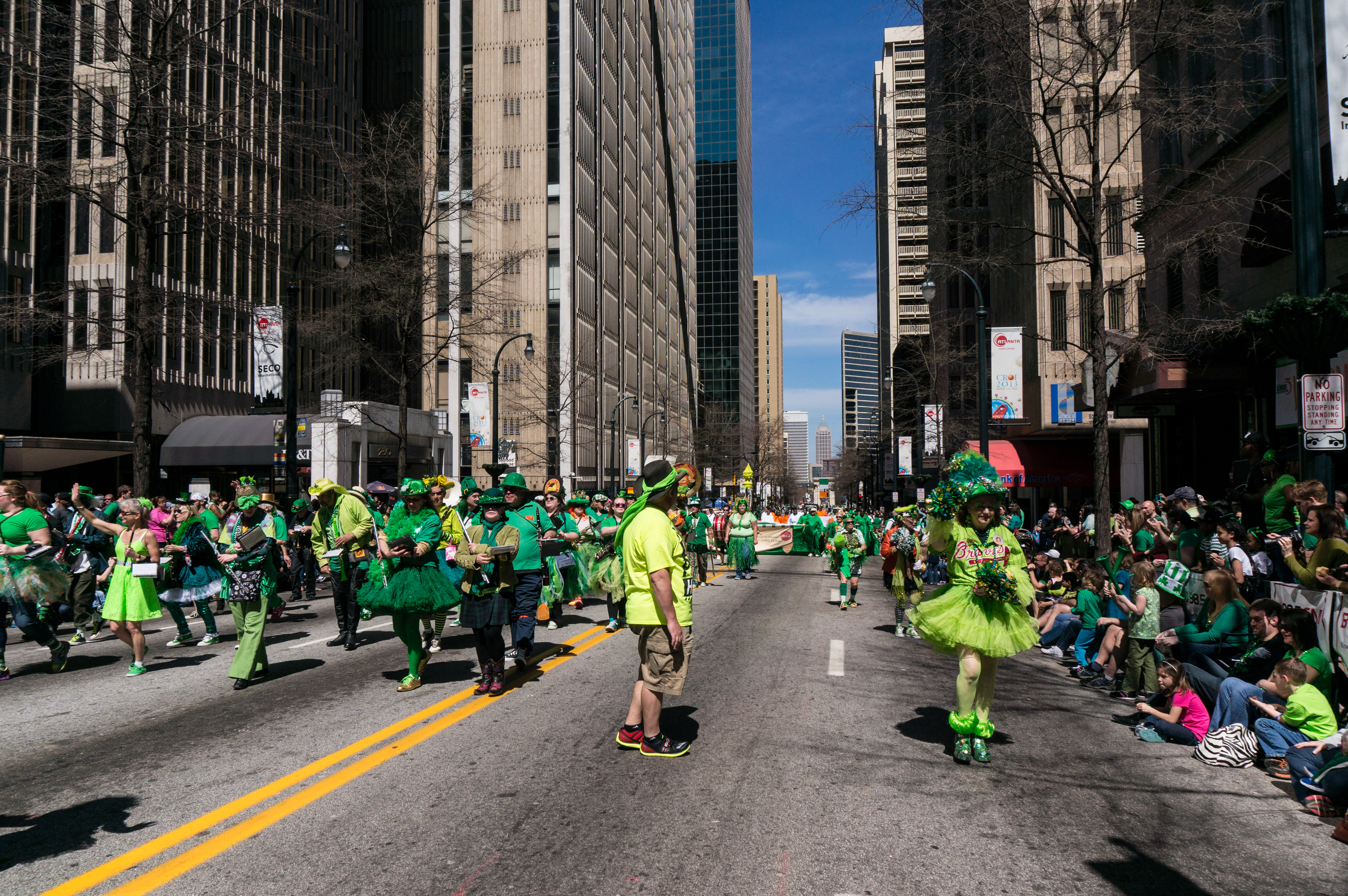
Atlanta St. Patrick's Day Parade on Peachtree Street, 2013

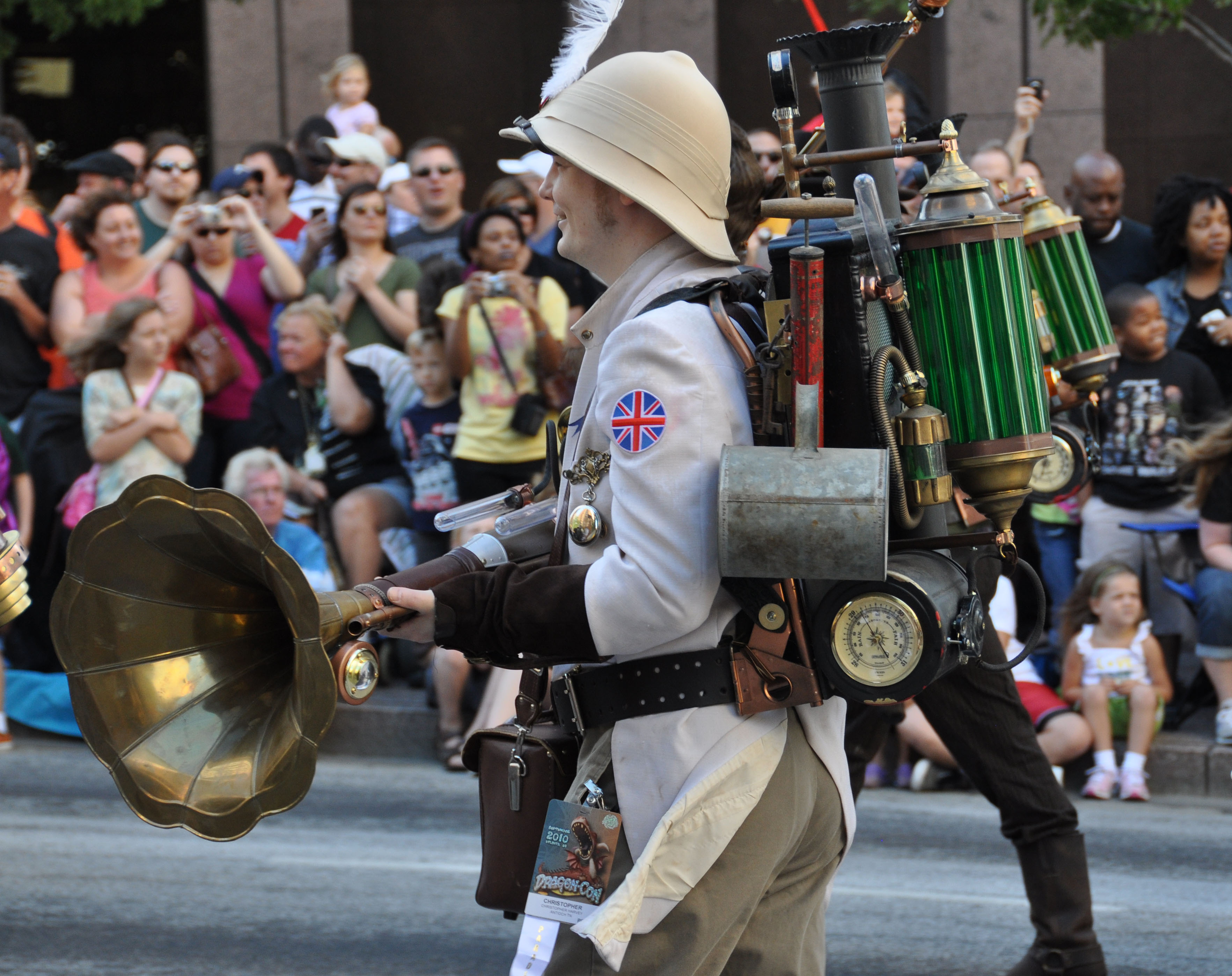
Dragon Con parade

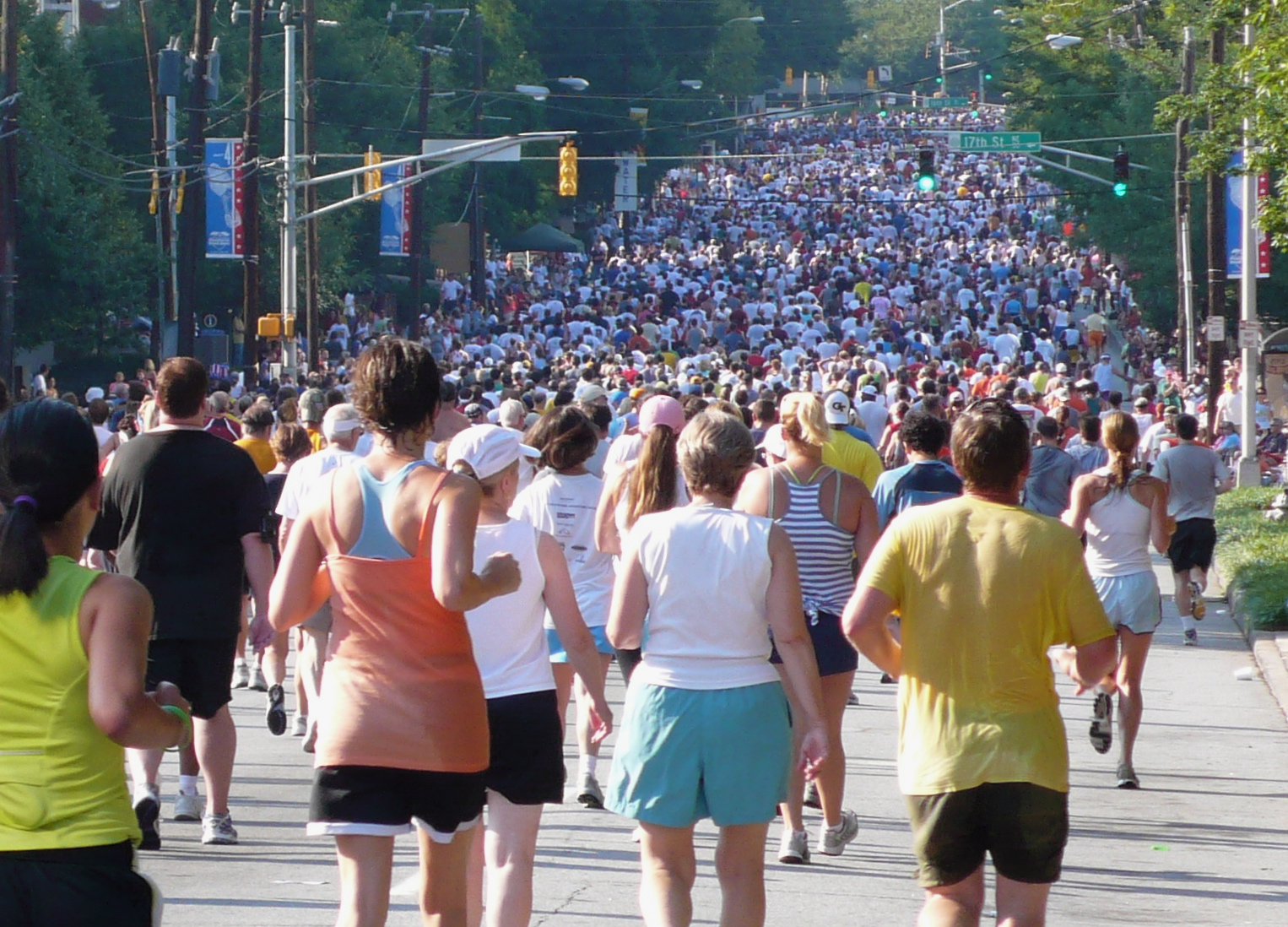
The Peachtree Road Race

Atlanta's mild climate and plentiful trees allow for festivals and events to take place in the city year-round. One of the city's most popular events is the Atlanta Dogwood Festival, an arts and crafts festival held in Piedmont Park each spring, when the native dogwoods are in bloom. Atlanta Streets Alive, inspired by the ciclovía in Bogotá, Colombia, closes city streets to car traffic to allow people to participate in health and community-oriented, such as bicycling, strolling, skating, people-watching, tango, yoga, hula hooping, and break dancing.

== Neighborhood ==
Inman Park Festival, held in the spring in one of Atlanta’s oldest neighborhoods, offers an artist market, live entertainment, and a wide variety of food vendors. Kirkwood Spring Fling is held in eastside neighborhood of Kirkwood each May. The festival is centered on Bessie Branham Park and features a 5K run in the morning, artist market, live music, Tour of Homes, and a variety of local food trucks and restaurants. Little Five Points Halloween Festival, winner of the 2003 Best Festival award by the International Festival and Events Association, takes place the weekend before Halloween in Atlanta's bohemian district, involving a parade and costume contest. The Virginia Highland neighborhood holds both an annual Virginia-Highland Summerfest festival, focusing on art but also featuring the dave fm music stage; as well as the Virginia-Highland Tour of Homes each December and the North Highland Mile around Easter.

== Ethnic ==
Atlanta's large Hispanic community is represented in Festival Peachtree Latino, the largest multicultural festival in the Southeast, which is held annually at Piedmont Park. Other ethnic celebrations include the National Black Arts Festival, the Atlanta Caribbean Carnival, St. Patrick's Day parade, the Atlanta Greek Festival, the Atlanta Turkish Festival, Festival of India, JapanFest, and Korean Festival.

== LGBT+ ==
Atlanta is home to some of the nation's largest gay pride festivals, Atlanta Pride, as well as what is billed as the world's largest black gay pride celebration, Atlanta Black Pride.

== Film ==
Atlanta is the host of the Atlanta Film Festival, an Academy Award qualifying, international film festival held every April and showcasing a diverse range of independent films, including genre films such as horror and sci-fi. Other film festivals include the Atlanta Jewish Film Festival, the Atlanta Asian Film Festival, the Out on Film gay film festival, Independent Film Month, Atlanta Film Festival 365, Atlanta Underground Film Festival, Atlanta International Documentary Film Festival, and the Buried Alive horror film fest.

The CinErotic FilmFest is a 3-day festival established in 2010 and "dedicated to screening short films on Super 8mm and 16mm".

There is also the Bronzelens Film Festival, held every year in Atlanta.

== Music ==
Atlanta's main music festival is Music Midtown, which was revived in 2011 after a six-year hiatus. The festival, which is held in Piedmont Park, hosts major bands like Coldplay and The Black Keys. Peachtree Music Festival is a one-day, two-stage outdoor music festival held at the corner of 8th Street and Spring Street in the city's Midtown district. The festival blends indie rock bands with electronica DJs. Atlanta also hosts one of the largest free jazz festivals in the country, the Atlanta Jazz Festival. In 2017, the Atlanta Jazz Festival will celebrate its 40th year and include 40 Days of Jazz leading up to the Memorial Day weekend event that takes place in Piedmont Park. Corndogorama is a yearly music festival, founded in 1996 by Dave Railey, which features performances from local bands including Indie rock, Hip hop, Metal, and Electronic groups. There is also an Atlanta Trumpet Festival.

== Conventions ==
Dragon Con is a yearly multigenre convention with an associated parade. Dragon Con's 2014 attendance was 63,000.

== Races ==
Atlanta hosts dozens of yearly races including the Peachtree Road Race.

== List of some festivals and events ==
- A3C Festival & Conference
- Anime Weekend Atlanta
- Atlanta Arts Festival in Piedmont Park
- Atlanta Asian Cultural Experience
- Atlanta Black Pride
- Atlanta Caribbean Carnival
- Atlanta Celebrates Photography
- Atlanta Cycling Festival
- Atlanta Dogwood Festival
- Atlanta Film Festival
- Atlanta Greek Festival
- Atlanta Ice Cream Festival
- Atlanta Jazz Festival
- Atlanta Jewish Film Festival
- Atlanta Pride
- Atlanta Science Festival
- Atlanta Streets Alive
- Bulgarian Festival Atlanta
- Atlanta Turkish Festival
- Cheese Fest Atlanta
- Children's Christmas Parade
- Dragon Con
- Fall in the Fourth, Old Fourth Ward
- Festival of India
- Festival of Trees
- Festival on Ponce, Druid Hills
- Festival Peachtree Latino
- First Night
- Fourth of July at Lenox Square and Centennial Olympic Park
- Furry Weekend Atlanta
- Gathering 4 Gardner
- Georgia Renaissance Festival
- Inman Park Festival
- JapanFest Atlanta
- JordanCon
- Juneteenth Parade & Music Festival
- Kirkwood Spring Fling
- Kirkwood Wine Stroll
- Kirkwood Home for the Holidays
- Korean Festival
- Little Five Points Halloween Festival
- MomoCon
- Music Midtown
- National Black Arts Festival
- Outlanta Con
- Out on Film
- Passion Play
- Peachtree Road Race
- Screen on the Green
- Seishun-Con
- Southeastern Flower Show
- St. Patrick's Day Parade
- Sweet Auburn Heritage Festival
- Sweet Auburn Music Fest
- Sweetwater 420 Festival, Candler Park
- Summit Racing Equipment Atlanta Motorama at Atlanta Motor Speedway
- Taste of Atlanta
- Taste of Buckhead
- TimeGate
- TomorrowWorld
- Tour de Georgia
- Virginia-Highland Summerfest
- Virginia-Highland Tour of Homes
- Walker Stalker Convention
- Yellow Daisy Festival
