= Screen on the Green (disambiguation) =

The Screen on the Green is an English cinema in Islington, London, England.

Screen on the Green may also refer to:

- Screen on the Green (Atlanta), an outdoor summer movie festival in Atlanta, Georgia
- Screen on the Green (Washington, DC), an outdoor summer movie festival in Washington, DC
