= Green screen (disambiguation) =

Green screen compositing, or more generally chroma key compositing, is a technique for combining two still images or video frames.

Green screen may also refer to:

- Green-screen display, a monochrome CRT computer display
- GreenScreen Interactive Software, a publisher of video games
- Green screen of death, a failure mode on the TiVo digital video recorder and Xbox 360 console game system platforms
- Green Screen film festival, a film festival in Germany
- GreenScreen for Safer Chemicals a green chemicals assessment tool.
- Drew Carey's Green Screen Show, an American improvisational show using a green screen

== See also ==
- Screen on the Green (disambiguation)
