= Piedmont Driving Club =

Private social club in Atlanta, Georgia

Coordinates: 33°47′18″N 84°22′37″W

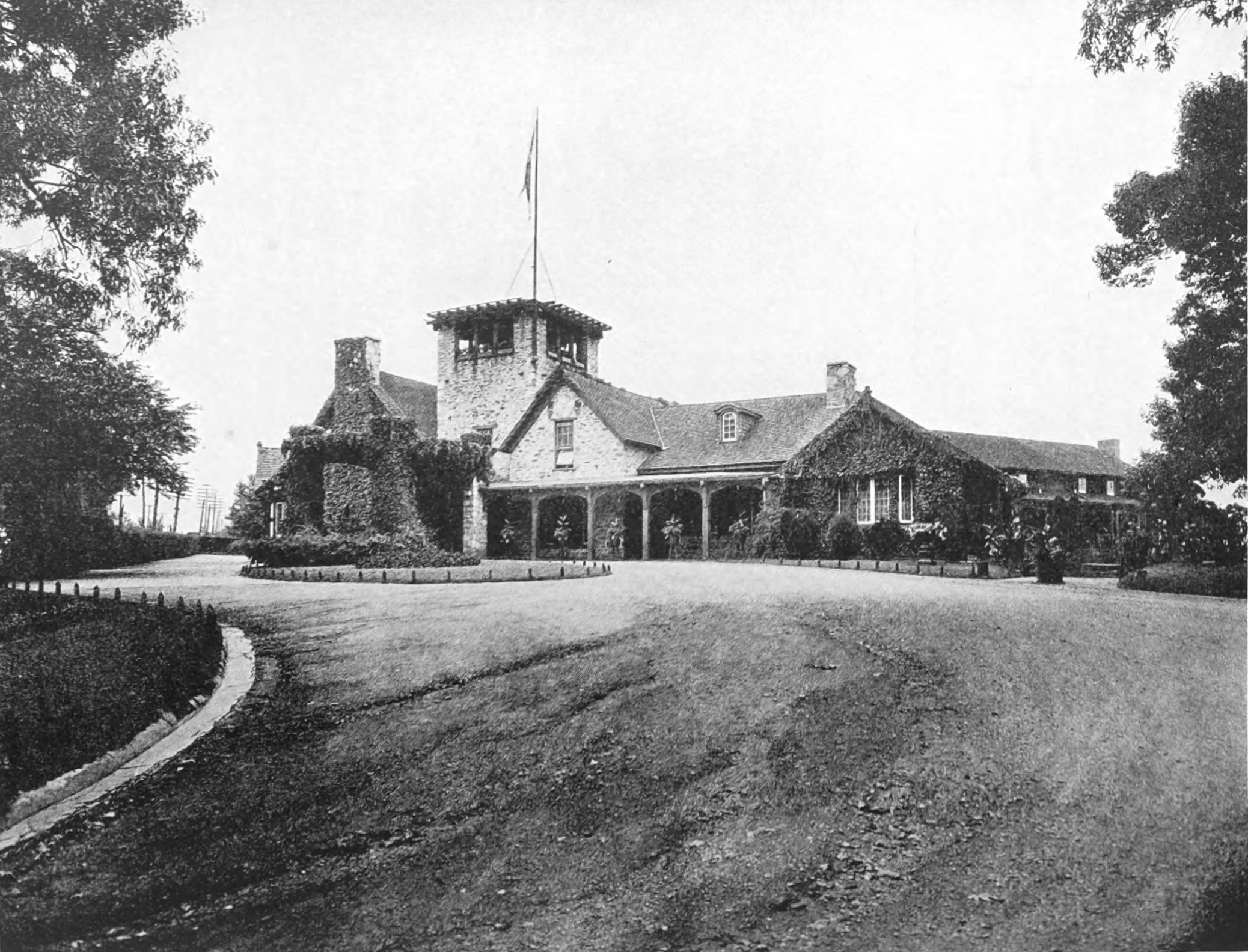
Piedmont Driving Club in 1938

The Piedmont Driving Club (previously the Gentlemen's Driving Club) is a private social club with two club houses in Atlanta, Georgia.

Founded in 1887 (139 years ago) originally as the Gentlemen's Driving Club, the name reflected the interest of the members to "drive" their horse and carriages on the club grounds. The club later briefly used the adjacent grounds as a golf course until it sold the land to the city in 1904 to create Piedmont Park. The club admitted its first black member in 1994.

The club's facilities include golf, tennis, padel, squash, swimming, exercise facilities, massage, casual and fine dining, and event space for larger gatherings. In May 2000, the club built a Rees Jones-designed 18-hole championship golf course and executive par-3 course several miles from the main clubhouse on Camp Creek Parkway. In 2014, the club hosted one of two 2014 US Amateur Qualifier golf tournaments in Georgia. In 2018, it also hosted the Georgia Mid-Amateur Championship.

From July 2008 through December 2009, it underwent a renovation to its informal dining and athletic facilities. The squash program was expanded to include two international hardball doubles courts and two international singles courts. The club hosted the annual cross-border, US versus Canada, Lapham Grant competition for the second time in 2012. The club previously served as one of several host venues for the Peachtree Invitational platform tennis tournament. In 2024, the club became the first private club in Atlanta with a padel court.

== See also ==
- List of American gentlemen's clubs
