= Playscapes =

Playground designed by Isamu Noguchi in Atlanta, Georgia

Coordinates: 33.7849°N 84.3777°W

- Interactive map of Playscapes
- Type: Playground
- Location: Piedmont Park
- Nearest city: Atlanta, Georgia, United States
- Area: 1 acre (0.40 ha)
- Created: May 1, 1976
- Designer: Isamu Noguchi
- Administrator: Piedmont Park Conservancy

Playscapes is a playground designed by artist and landscape architect Isamu Noguchi. Completed in 1976, the playground is located in Atlanta, Georgia, United States, in the city's Piedmont Park.

== Background ==
Japanese-American artist Isamu Noguchi developed his first playground design in 1933. While the design, called Play Mountain, was never realized, Noguchi continued to create playground concepts and tried over the next several decades to implement them, with little success. In 1940, he developed a playground idea for Ala Moana Park near Honolulu, though this project never came to fruition. Throughout the 1950s and 1960s, he unsuccessfully attempted to build a playground in New York City, with potential sites including near the headquarters of the United Nations and Riverside Park. For the latter project, Noguchi worked with architect Louis Kahn in the designs. His first realized playground project came about in 1965, with the temporary Kodomo no Kuni playground outside of Tokyo.

== Playground in Atlanta ==
In 1973, a volunteer at the High Museum of Art in Atlanta suggested creating a playground that could also serve as a work of art. The museum director was responsive to the idea, and it was decided that the piece would serve as the High Museum's gift to the city of Atlanta for the United States Bicentennial. The museum was given a site in the city's Piedmont Park to build the playground, and Noguchi was officially hired in October 1975, with his designs for the playground completed that December. Noguchi was given a commission of $225,000 to build the playground. The playground was completed the following year, in time for the bicentennial celebrations, with Atlanta Mayor Maynard Jackson accepting the playground on behalf of the city. The ribbon-cutting ceremony on May 1, 1976, was attended by both Jackson and Mayor H.R. Pufnstuf, a fictional character from the children's television series of the same name. The playground, occupying about 1 acre (0.40 ha) near the park's 12th Street entrance, was the only playground constructed by Noguchi before his death in 1988.

== Restorations ==
In 1996, 20 years after its debut, the playground underwent a pro bono restoration by the Japanese construction company Kajima. This was in preparation for the 1996 Summer Olympics held in Atlanta. By the mid-2000s, additional issues with the site became present, including rust on the slides and graffiti on some of the equipment. A 2008 appraisal put the replacement value for the playground at $3 million, and between 2008 and 2009, the city spent $350,000 restoring the playground, including minor alterations to the design of some of the equipment to meet improved safety standards. In 2014, the playground underwent another restoration. The restoration, funded by a $21,000 grant from the manufacturing company Herman Miller's philanthropic foundation, saw the entire playground repainted and a pavilion wall repaired.

2009 Rededication ceremony
