= Warren Bruno =

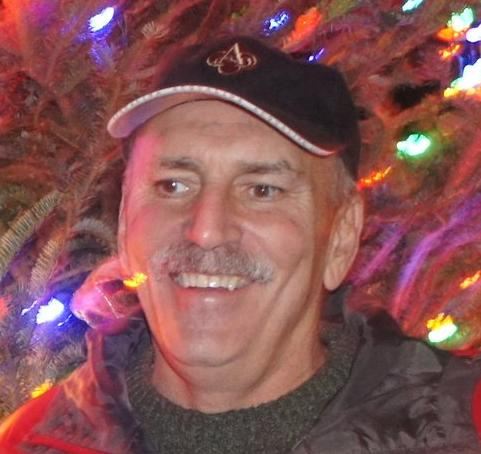
Warren Bruno at Tree Lighting, New Highland Park, Virginia-Highland, Atlanta, December 2010

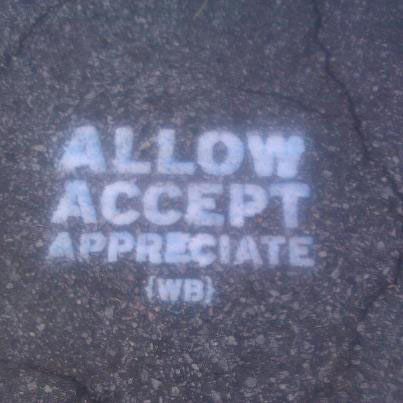
Stencil in memory of Warren Bruno as seen on a pavement in Virginia-Highland, Atlanta, May 2012

Warren Bruno (died 2012) was a restaurateur in Atlanta and a community leader in Atlanta's Virginia-Highland neighborhood.

In 1983, Bruno bought the Atkins Park Restaurant in Virginia-Highland. Bruno operated a total of 12 restaurants and bars in Metro Atlanta. He was a co-founder of the Buckhead Village Merchants Association and the Virginia-Highland Business Association.

The Virginia-Highland Summerfest festival began as a block party with Bruno and other local businesses in 1984. The party took place between St. Charles and Greenwood Avenues along N. Highland Avenue and was intended to bring together local businesses and residents.
