= Corndogorama =

Music festival in Georgia, United States

Corndogorama is a yearly music festival held in Atlanta, Georgia. Founded by Dave Railey in 1996, it features performances from local bands including Indie rock, Hip hop, Metal, and Electronic groups.
