= Atlanta Trumpet Festival =

The Atlanta Trumpet Festival is hosted by the Atlanta Trumpet Ensemble under the direction of Kay and David Fairchild. The festival started in conjunction with the creation of the "Atlanta Youth Trumpet Ensemble" in 2004 which has since been renamed the Atlanta Trumpet Ensemble. The festival occurs annually around mid-September and lasts a total of two days. Throughout the day trumpet players from around North America participate in rehearsals and clinics given by some of the finest trumpet instructors of the United States.

== Festival directors ==
- Kay Fairchild
- David Fairchild
- Stanford Thompson

== Guest clinicians ==
- Mike Barry (2004)
- Kevin Lyons (2004)
- Christopher Martin (2004)
- Peter Bond (2005)
- Bradley Ulrich (2005)
- Gordon Vernick (2005)
- Michael Anderson (2006)
- Mark Clodfelter (2006)
- Vincent DiMartino (2006)
- Kevin Eisensmith (Expected 2007)
- Mark Clodfelter (Expected 2007)
- Scotty Barnhart (Expected 2007)

== Guest conductors ==
- Charles Jackson (2004)
- Freddy Martin (2004)
- David Fairchild (2004)
- Charles Jackson (2005)
- Bradley Ulrich (2005)
- Charles Brown (2005)
- Charles Jackson (2006)
- Garry Gribble (2006)
- Ryan Forbes (2006)
- Charles Jackson (2007)
- Carol Doemel (2007)
- James Seda (2007)
- Mark Clodfelter (2007)
