= Atlanta Dogwood Festival =

Arts and crafts festival in Atlanta, Georgia

Coordinates: 33°47′10.00″N 84°22′24.00″W

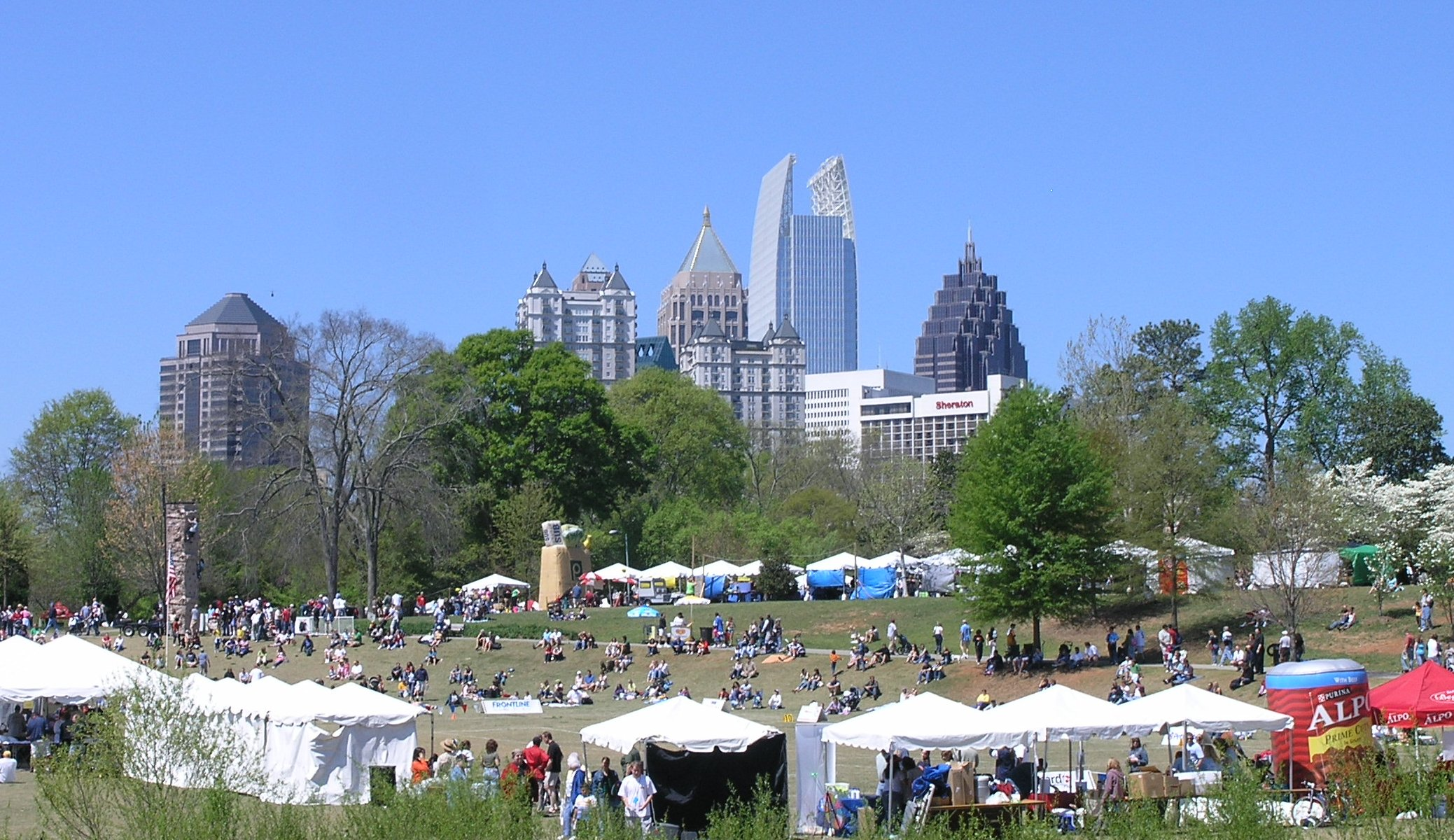
Dogwood Festival 2006

The Atlanta Dogwood Festival is an arts and crafts festival held each spring at Piedmont Park in Atlanta, Georgia, established in 1933. Originally held for nine days across two weekends and the weekdays between, it is now held only one weekend during early April, when the native flowering dogwood trees are in bloom. The festival attracts approximately 200,000 annually.

There was no festival in 1942–45 nor 2020.
