= Piedmont Park =

Urban park in Atlanta, Georgia

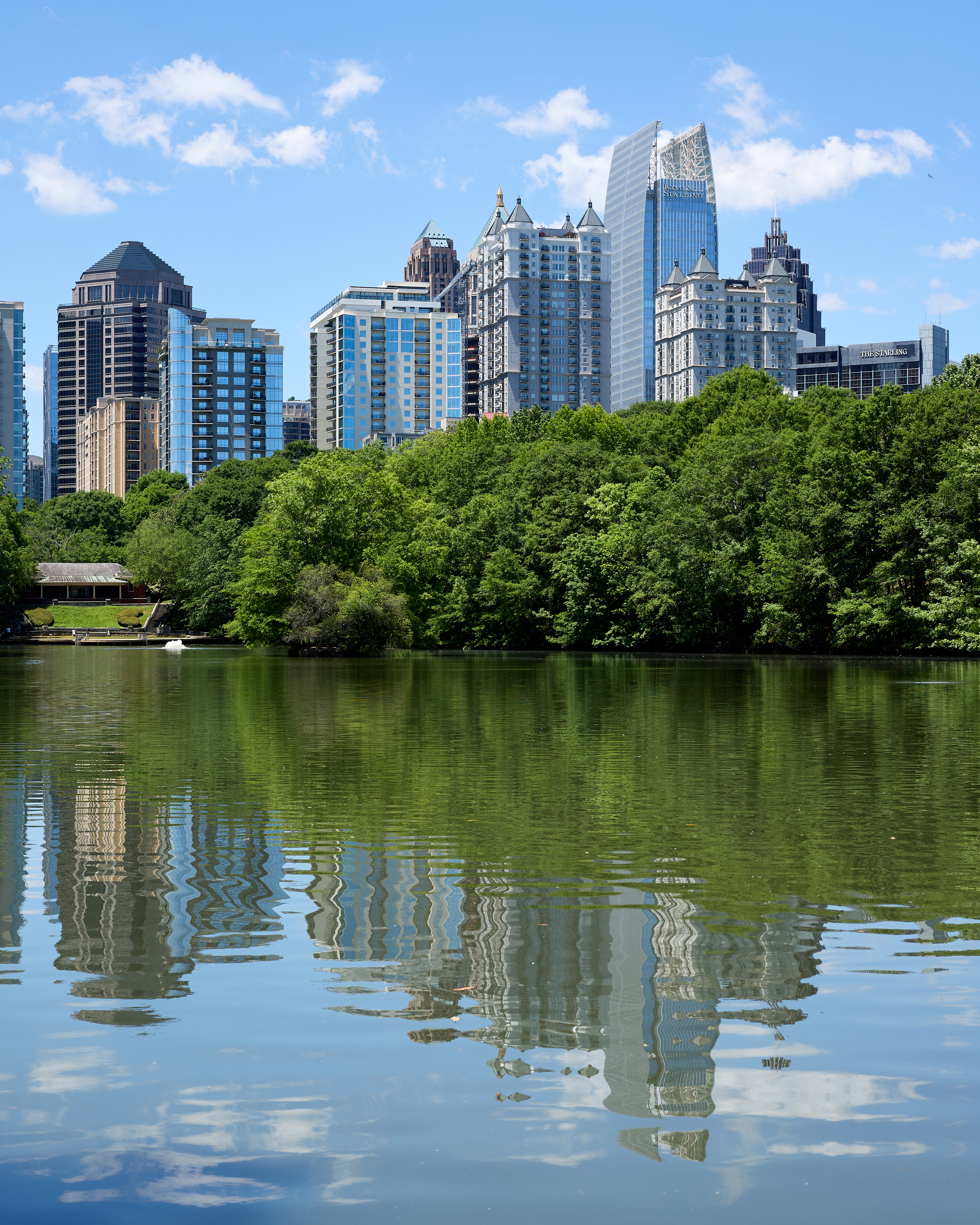
- Piedmont Park’s Lake Clara Meer with Midtown skyline in the background
- Interactive map of Piedmont Park
- Type: Municipal
- Location: Atlanta, Georgia
- Coordinates: 33°47′10″N 84°22′24″W
- Area: 189 acres (76 ha)
- Created: 1895
- Operator: Atlanta Department of Parks and Recreation
- Open: All year
- Website: Official website
- Piedmont Park
- U.S. National Register of Historic Places
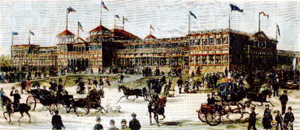
- 1887 Piedmont Expo
- Architect: Joseph Forsyth Johnson; John Charles Olmsted; Frederick Law Olmsted Jr.
- NRHP reference No.: 76000629
- Added to NRHP: May 13, 1976

Piedmont Park is an urban forest and park in Atlanta, Georgia, United States, located about 1 mile (1.6 km) northeast of Downtown, between the Midtown and Virginia Highland neighborhoods. Originally the land was owned by Dr. Benjamin Walker, who used it as his out-of-town gentleman's farm and residence. He sold the land in 1887 to the Gentlemen's Driving Club (later renamed the Piedmont Driving Club), who wanted to establish an exclusive club and racing ground for horse enthusiasts. The Driving Club entered an agreement with the Piedmont Exposition Company, headed by prominent Atlantan Charles A. Collier, to use the land for fairs and expositions and later gave the park its name.

The park was originally designed by Joseph Forsyth Johnson to host the first of two major expositions held in the park in the late 19th century. The Piedmont Exposition opened in October 1887 to great fanfare. The event was a success and set the stage for the Cotton States and International Exposition which was held in the park seven years later in 1895. Both exhibitions showcased the prosperity of the region that had occurred during and after the Reconstruction period. In the early 20th century, a redesign plan called the Olmsted plan, was begun by the sons of New York Central Park architect, Frederick Law Olmsted. The effort led to the addition of scenic paths in the park and the joining of the park with the Ansley park system.

Over the years, the park has also served as an athletic center for the city. Atlanta's first professional baseball team, the Atlanta Crackers, played in the park from 1902 to 1906. Several important intercollegiate rivalries were also forged in the park including the University of Georgia vs. Georgia Tech baseball rivalry and Georgia versus Auburn football which has been called the "Deep South's Oldest Rivalry".

Throughout the 20th century, many improvements have been made in the park, including the addition of covered picnic areas, tennis facilities, the Lake Clara Meer dock and visitors center, and two playgrounds. In 2008, a ground-breaking ceremony was held for a 53-acre (210,000 m^{2}) extension to the park. The first phase of a major expansion opened in 2011, and further renovations followed in the 2010s and 2020s.

== History ==
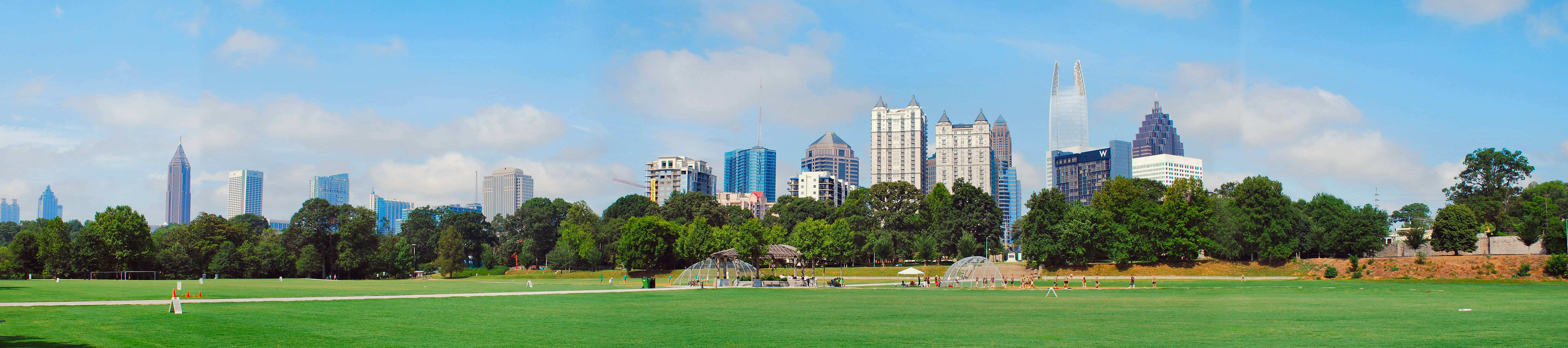
The Atlanta skyline from Piedmont Park

=== Opening ===
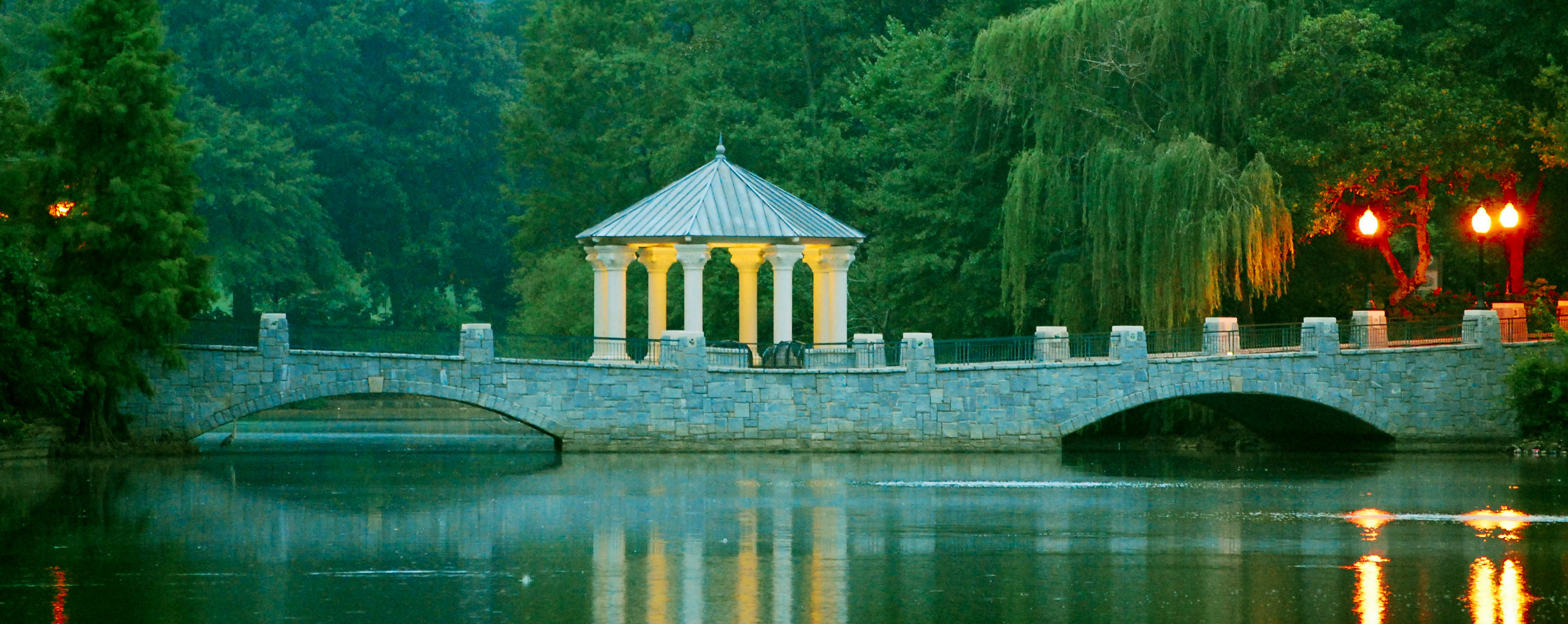
Bridge over Lake Clara Meer

Atlanta was a rapidly growing city in the years before Piedmont Park. From 1860 to 1890, the population jumped from 9,554 to 65,533 residents. Those years saw the opening of many education institutions such as Morehouse College (1867), Clark College (1869), Spelman College (1881), Morris Brown College (1882), Georgia School of Technology (now known as the Georgia Institute of Technology) (1885), and Agnes Scott College (1890). John B. Gordon, a distinguished Confederate general, was Governor of Georgia.

The area soon to be known as Piedmont Park was owned by Benjamin Walker, who purchased the 189 acres (0.76 km^{2}) in the 1830s from a man who had won the land in the land lottery. Walker farmed the land until, in 1887, he sold the land to the Gentlemen's Driving Club, known today as the Piedmont Driving Club, who planned "to form exclusive club and racing ground for horse enthusiasts". The driving club entered into an agreement with the Piedmont Exposition Company to use the grounds around the track as exposition space. Charles A. Collier, a prominent Atlanta businessman and former lawyer, was president of the company. Soon after, a main building, grandstands, and club house were built for the track.

=== The 1887 Piedmont Exposition ===
The first exposition ever held in Piedmont Park, the Piedmont Exposition of 1887, opened on October 10. The main building constructed for the Exposition was 570 feet (170 m) long, 126 feet (38 m) wide, and two stories high. The first day opened with 20,000 visitors. Samuel J. Randall opened the Exposition with a speech on the success of the resurrected post-civil war south. When his speech concluded, General Pierce M. B. Young and his men fired cannons to signal the opening of the events.

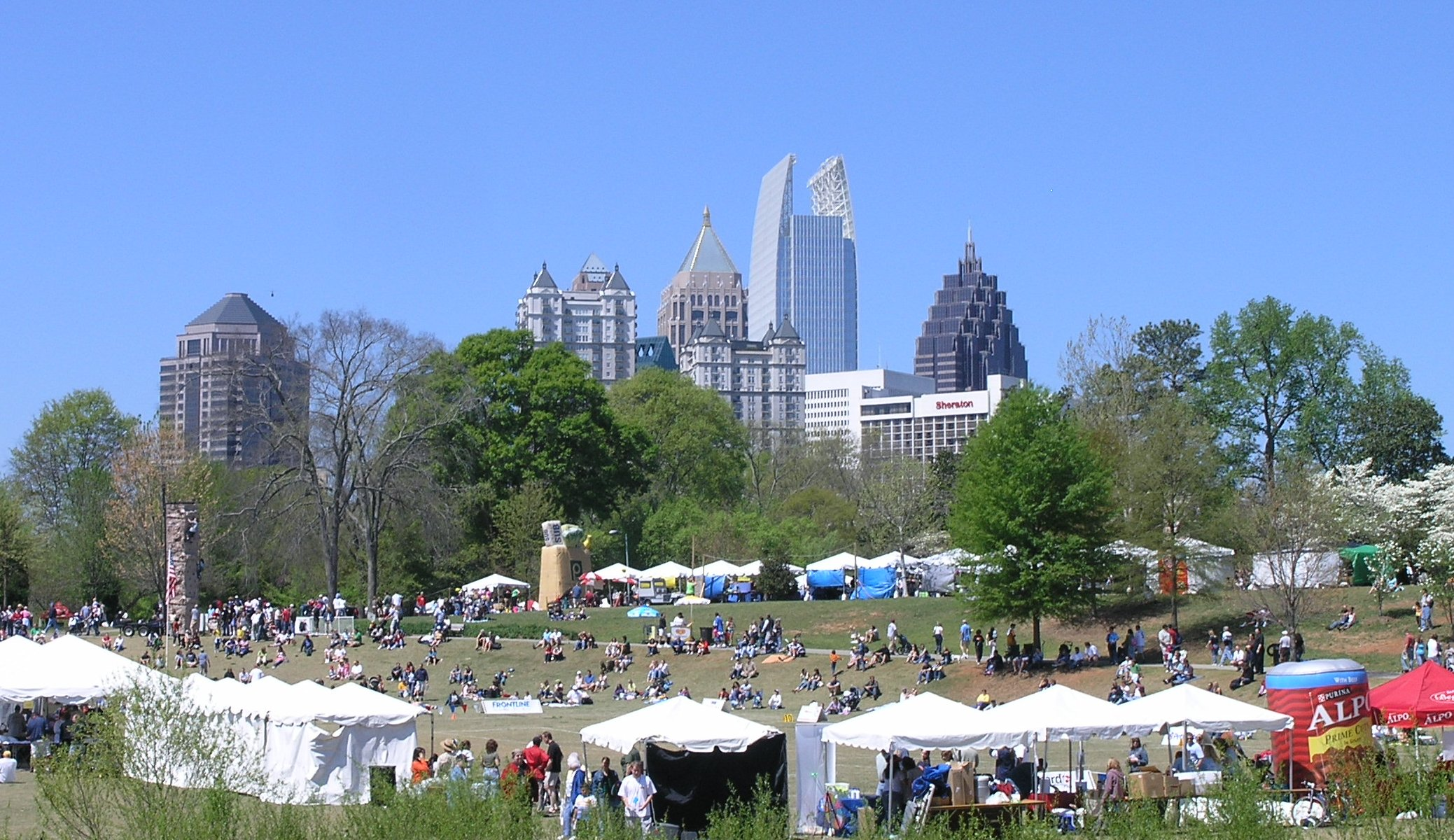
2006 Dogwood Festival with Midtown Atlanta skyline in background

Exhibitors showed off a variety of items including works of art, local raw materials like manganese, marble, and wood work. Many prominent figures of the day were in attendance to see the displays. Governor David B. Hill of New York spoke at the event as well as President Grover Cleveland who attended with his wife, Frances Folsom. Over 50,000 people were in attendance for Cleveland's speech. When the exposition was over, civic leaders said that it had successfully expanded Atlanta's reputation as a place to visit and to conduct business.

The Exposition was also a chance for Atlanta to prove that it was ready to host a world's fair. The Executive Committee of the Fair was invited to attend the event under the bidding of Charles Reynolds, Secretary of the Piedmont Exposition Company.

=== The "Deep South's Oldest Rivalry" ===
Five years later, Piedmont Park was the location of the second football game and the beginning of the "Deep South's Oldest Rivalry" between Auburn University (then named Agricultural and Mechanical College of Alabama) and the University of Georgia. The game was arranged by former Johns Hopkins classmates, Dr. Charles Herty of Georgia and Dr. George Petrie of Auburn. Auburn won the game 10–0. It was rumored afterward that Georgia's mascot, a goat (it wasn't until 1921 that Georgia officially became the Bulldogs), was the main course at a barbecue held by Georgia fans after the game.

=== Cotton States and International Exposition (1895) ===
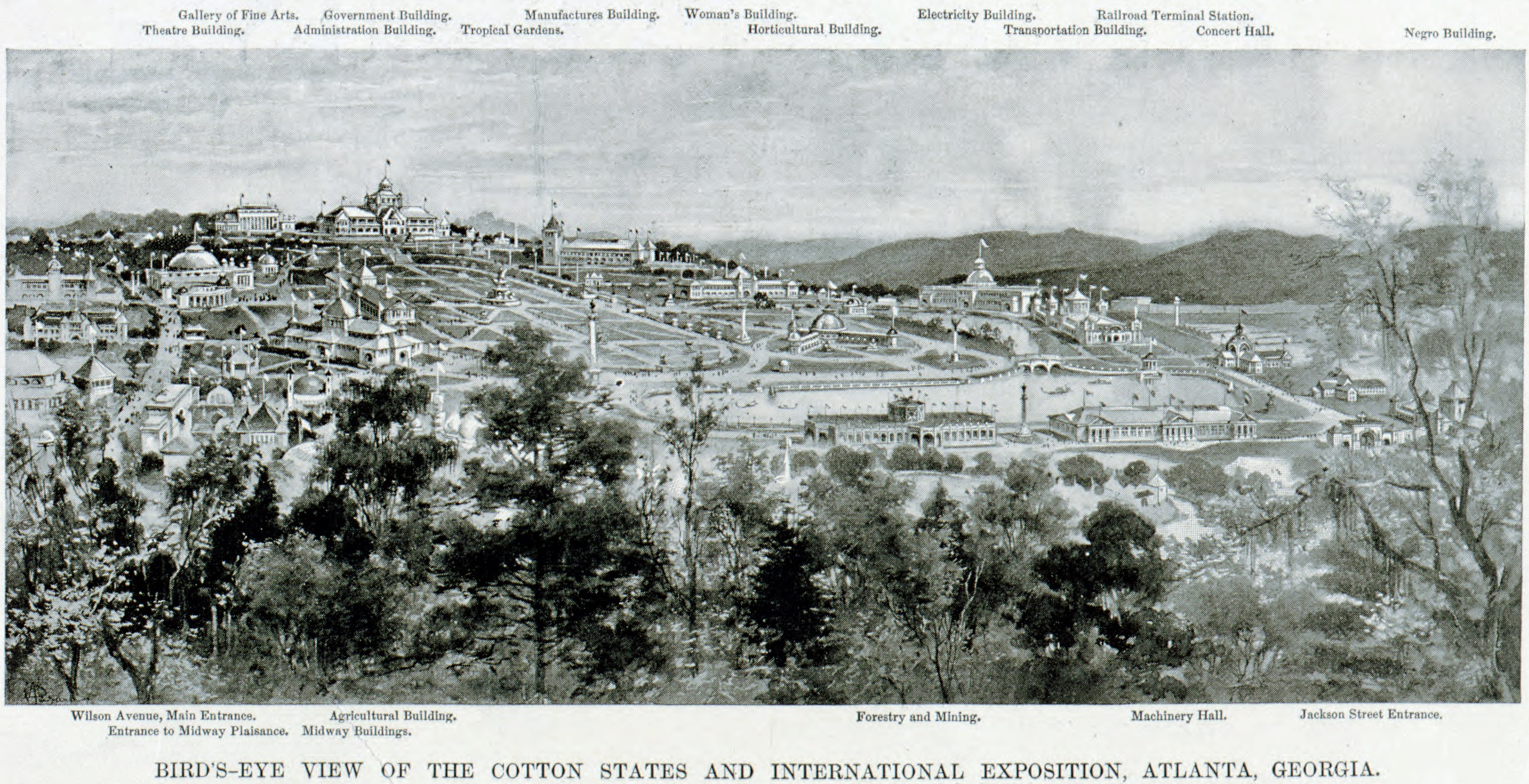
Lithograph of Piedmont Park plans for the 1895 Cotton States Exposition in Atlanta, GA c.1894

In 1894, the Piedmont Exposition Company offered to sell the land to the city of Atlanta for $165,000.00, but Mayor John B. Goodwin refused. The Cotton States and International Exposition which opened for 100 days beginning on September 18, 1895 and ending December 31, 1895, attracted visitors from the U.S. and 13 countries. Over $2 million was spent on the transformation of Piedmont Park. The government allocated $250,000 for the construction of a government building and many states and countries such as Argentina also had their own buildings. Also constructed for the fair were the Tropical gardens, now known as the Atlanta Botanical Garden, and Lake Clara Meer which was originally a pond but was expanded to 11.5 acres (47,000 m^{2}) for the event. Today, the stone balustrades scattered around the park are the only part of the enormous main building. The park remains largely as Joseph Forsyth Johnson designed it for the exposition although some changes were made during the Olmsted planning phase.

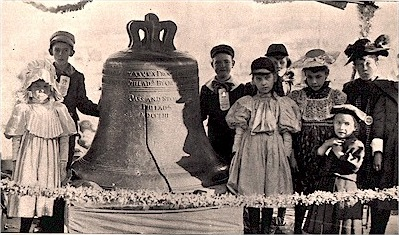
Atlanta school children pose with the Liberty Bell at the Expo

Booker T. Washington delivered his famous Atlanta Exposition Speech at the Expo, which is "widely regarded as one of the most significant speeches in American history." In his speech, Washington pushed for progress but not integration, a point that angered many other black leaders such as W. E. B. Du Bois. Attractions included Buffalo Bill's Wild West Show, the Liberty Bell, and the first public demonstration of C. Francis Jenkins and Thomas Armat's motion picture projection device which they called the Phantoscope. John Philip Sousa's "King Cotton" march was created for the expo and was performed at the ceremony, and was conducted by the composer himself. After the Exposition, the park continued to be extremely popular and was a magnet for growth in the area. State fairs and holiday celebrations were held at the park. Street car lines to the park increased. It was a generally prosperous time.

=== The beginnings of Atlanta baseball ===
Piedmont Park baseball field as it looked in 1902

In March 1898, the baseball fields were finally completed. On April 16, 1898, the first baseball game between Georgia and Georgia Tech, then known as the Georgia School of Technology, was played. From 1902 through 1906, the Atlanta Crackers, the city's original professional baseball team played ball on the fields of Piedmont Park before moving to a stadium on Ponce de Leon Avenue.

=== The Olmsted plan ===
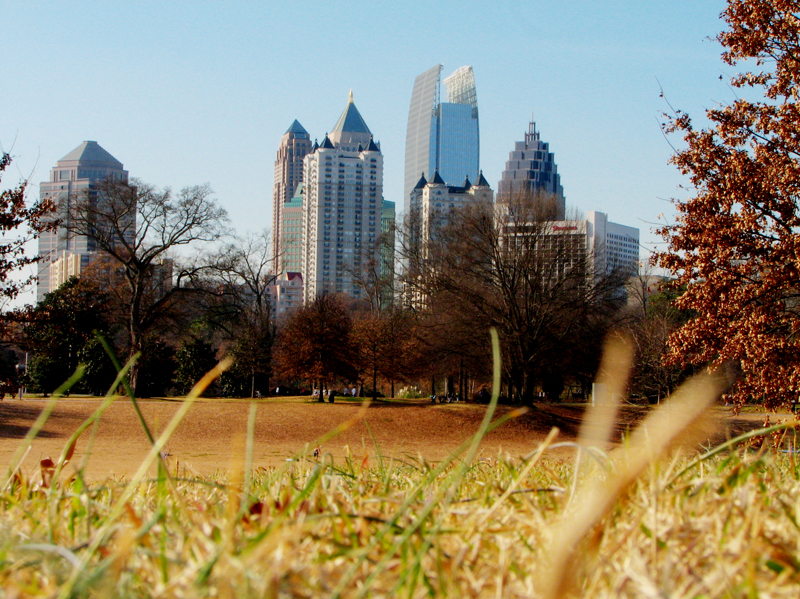
Piedmont Park in the fall

The year 1904 for was a watershed time for the park. The preceding year, the prominent Atlantan George Washington Collier died. Collier had owned 202 acres (0.82 km^{2}) of land to the west and north of the park that was sold for $300,000 to developers. The city bought the park for $98,000 in 1904, incorporating Piedmont Park into Atlanta's city limits. Mayor Evan Howell agreed to purchase the park, but only if it included those developed areas adjacent to the park which would add approximately $35,000 to $40,000 in tax revenues annually.

The main developer of Collier's land was Edwin Ansley, who created the Ansley Park subdivision under the guidelines set by the Olmsteds. The result was curvy streets surrounding "mini-parks" comprising a total of 25 acres (100,000 m^{2}). In 1912, these parks were deeded to the city.

In 1909, the sons of Frederick Law Olmsted, landscape architect for Central Park in New York, Carey and Frederick Jr. were asked to design the park's master plan while they were at work on Grant Park. The city agreed to pay $1,800 for the plan, but Olmsted was concerned that Atlanta might not have enough money for the necessary improvements.

In 1910, the brothers submitted a plan for the park that was to include a 5-mile (8.0 km) scenic path and driveways that would link Piedmont Park to the streets of Ansley Park. Joining the parks was a success and thereafter, the parks were known as Twin Parks.

=== 20th-century growth and development ===
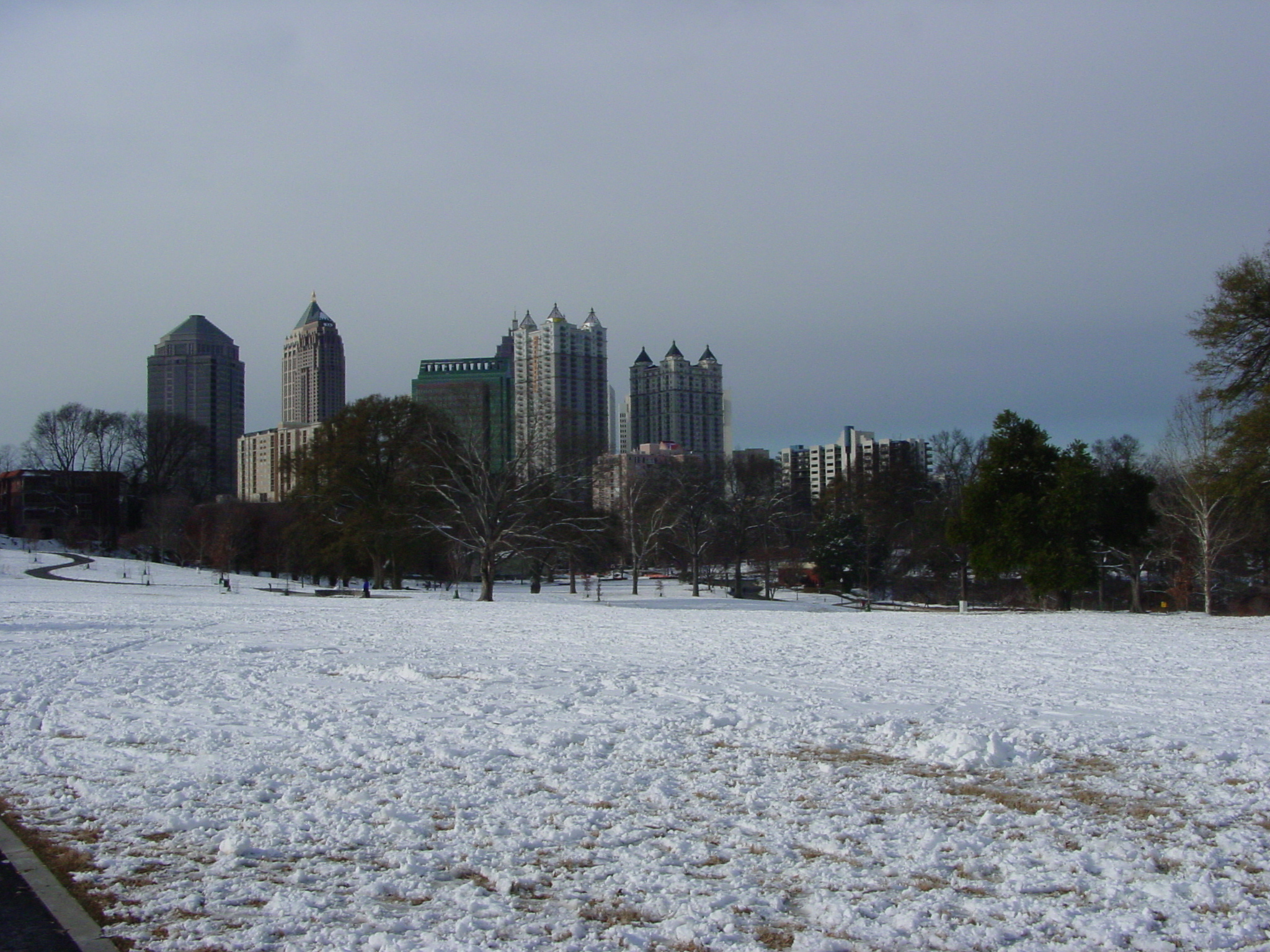
Piedmont Park in the winter

The park's first bathhouse was opened in 1911. Swimming in the lake was allowed until 1973, when the city opened a pool in the park. The same year the first bathhouse was opened, the Peace Monument, a Confederate monument, was dedicated in the park, near the 14th Street gate.

On January 29, 1913, Calvin Shelverton applied for a building permit to construct the Piedmont Park Apartments. The apartments were designed by Leila Ross Wilburn and were decidedly middle-class unlike some of the other developments in the area. The apartments remained middle-class up until about 1960, and residents included such prominent Atlantans as accounting company president T. C. Dunlap and lawyer J. B. Stewart. In 1913, seven clay courts were built where the 1895 Cotton States and International Exposition's Manufacturers and Liberal Arts Building once was. Eight more courts were added in 1914 to accommodate the overwhelming demand. That same year, the Sidney Lanier Monument was dedicated in the park.

Notable additions and buildings include the bandstand, built in 1915; a picnic shelter constructed by the WPA in 1936; the Steffen Thomas-designed Pioneer Women memorial in 1938; the Noguchi Playscapes, completed in 1976 under the aegis of the High Museum and a grant from the National Endowment for the Arts and designed by world-renowned artist and sculptor Isamu Noguchi, noteworthy as the only public work by Noguchi in the U.S.

=== 21st century ===
The Piedmont Park Conservancy, a group inspired by the Central Park Conservancy, raised $65 million for a capital campaign between 2000 and 2012. In 2002, the dog park was opened. Playscapes underwent restoration in 2005 under Eddie Granderson, public arts manager of the City of Atlanta. Jablonski Berkowitz Conservation Inc. was selected to do the restoration and assessments began in September of that year. The company was charged with bringing the playground up to safety codes and restoring the original paint.

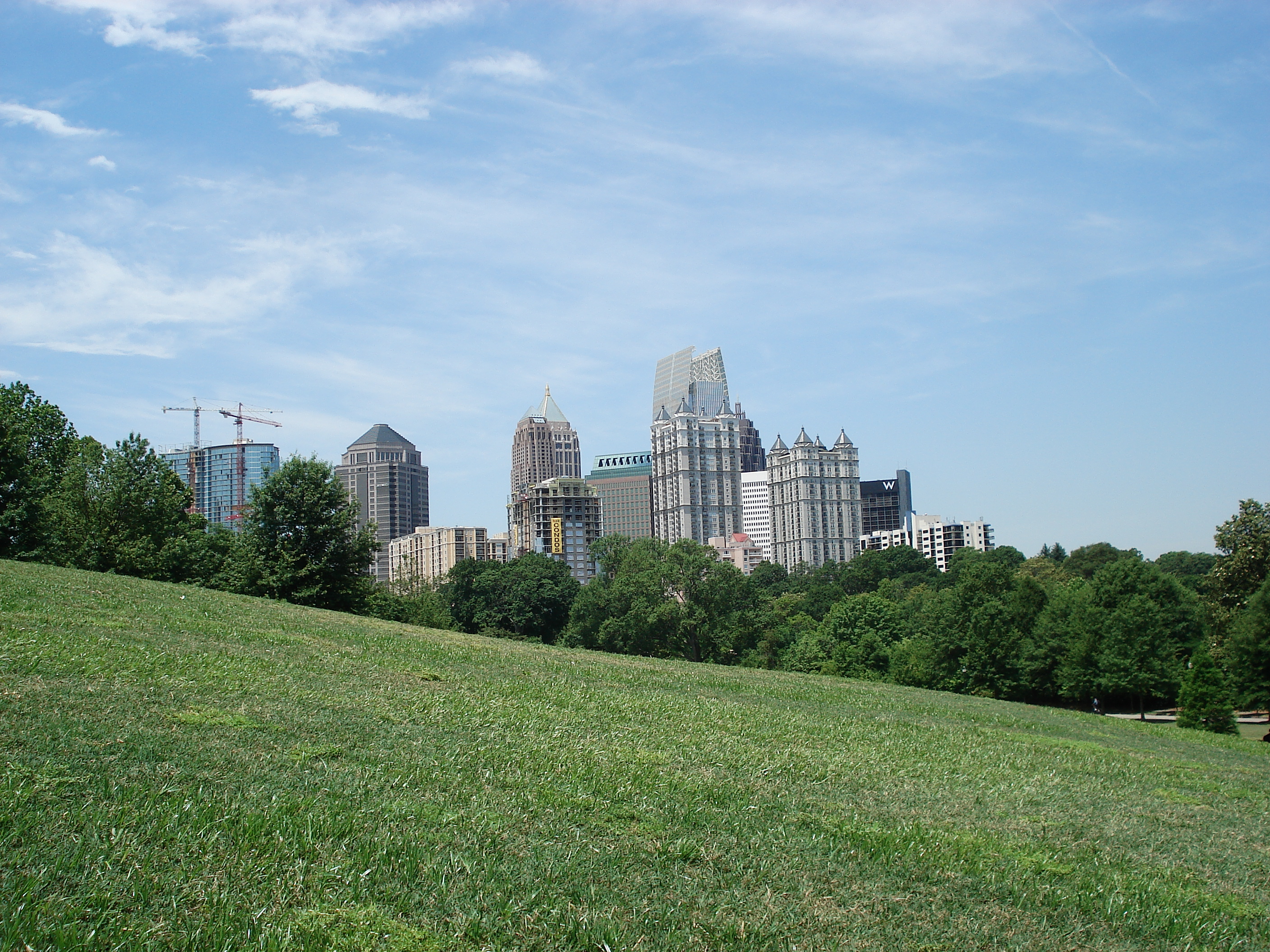
Piedmont Park during the 2008 drought

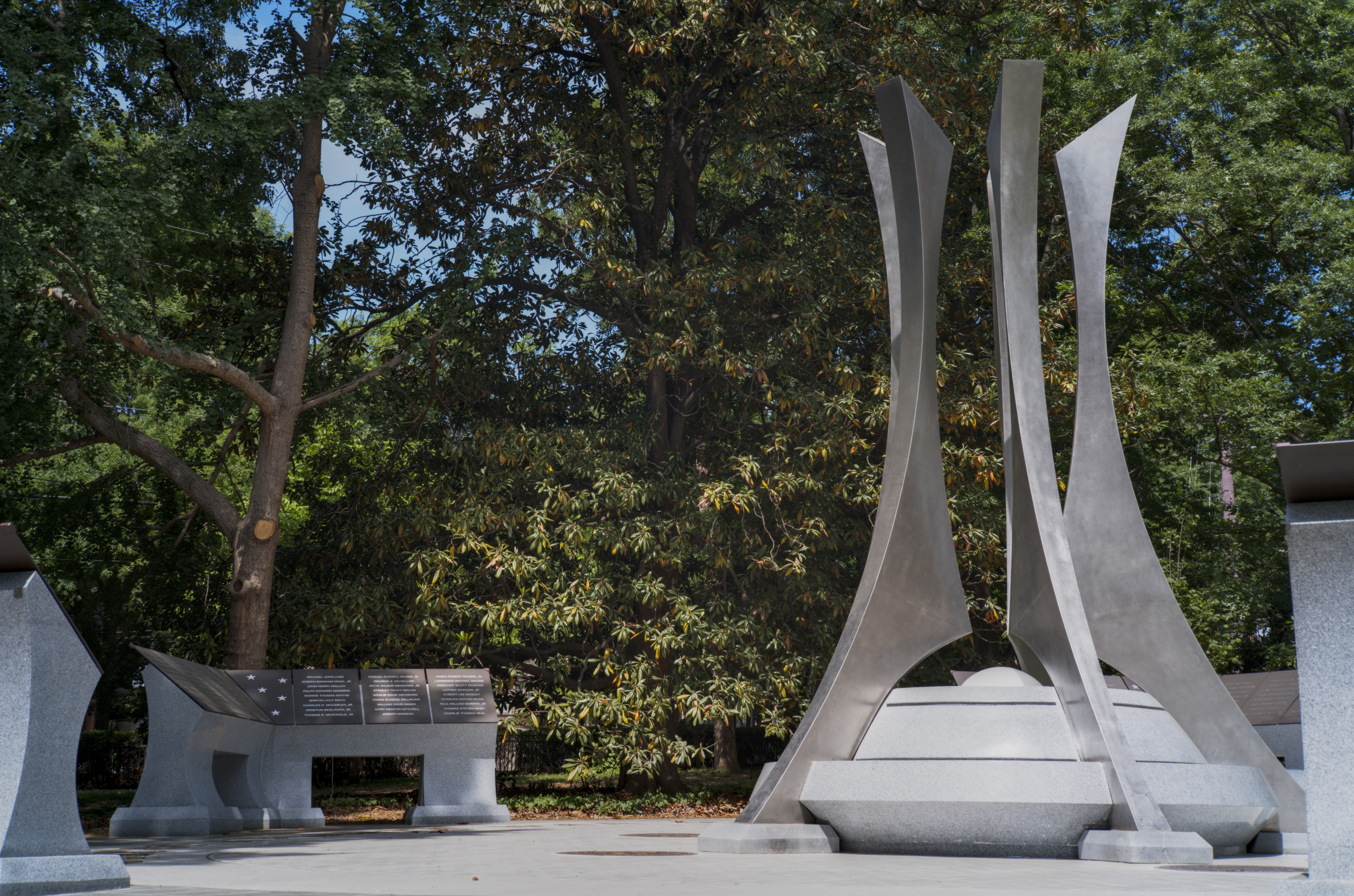
The Sons of Atlanta Vietnam War Memorial

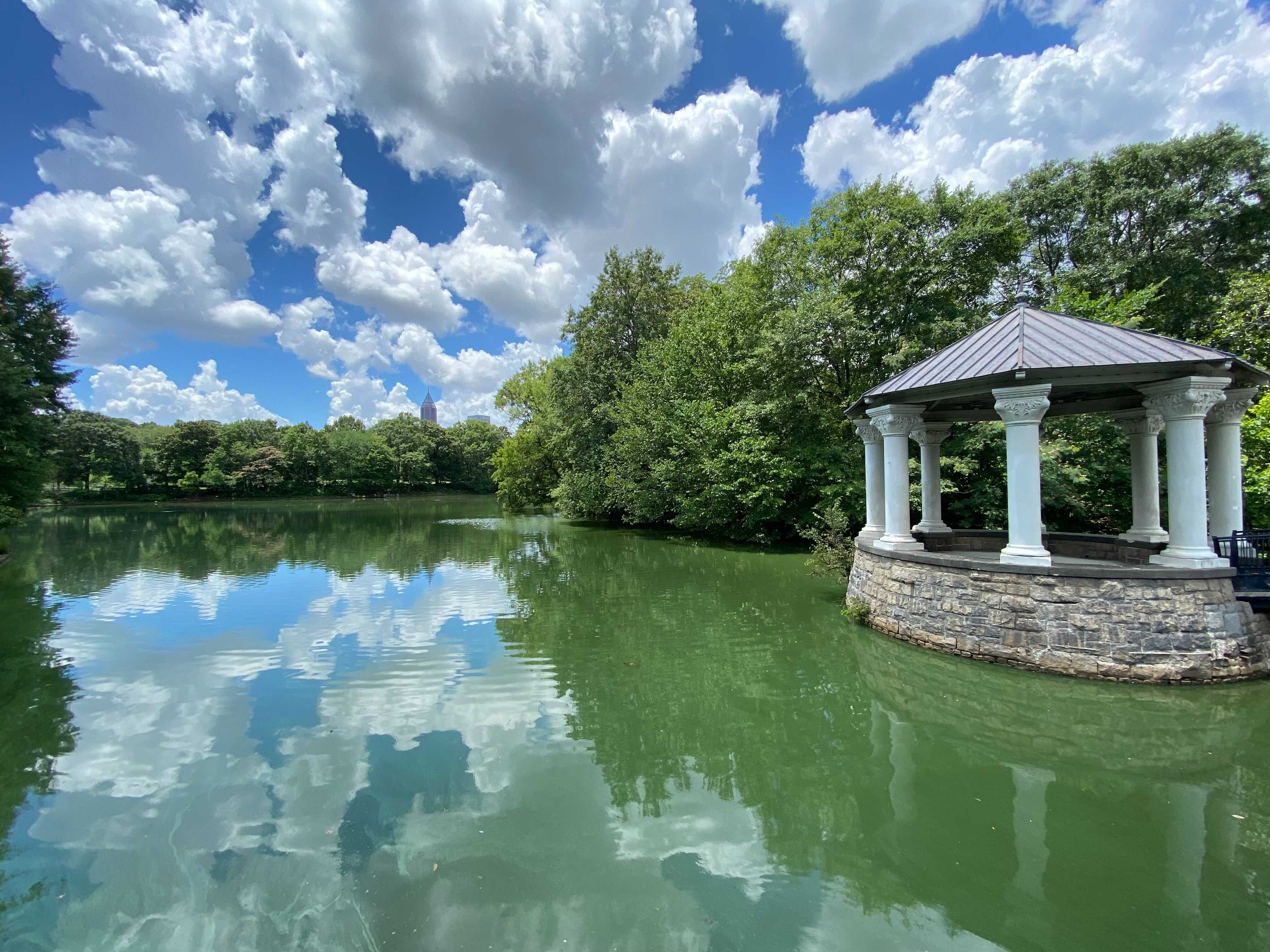
View of Lake Clara Meer from bridge

In January 2008, city officials announced that the Peachtree Road Race, Atlanta Pride Festival, the Atlanta Jazz Festival, and the Dogwood Festival would not be held in the park due to an extreme drought. Some festivals which don't make use of green space were still allowed in the park. The Atlanta Arts Festival ran from September 12–14, 2008, and utilized only paved areas. Other festivals were temporarily moved to alternate venues, such as Centennial Olympic Park. The drought in Atlanta ended by late 2009. In 2010, several events returned to Piedmont Park, including the Dogwood Festival, the Jazz Festival, and Screen on the Green.

In March 2026, the park unveiled Atlanta's first memorial dedicated to veterans of the Vietnam War. The plaza honors 240 people from Atlanta and Fulton County who lost their lives in the war.

The upcoming horror-movie HIDE & SEEK 3 was announced that filming will also take place in Piedmont Park.

==== 2011 expansion ====
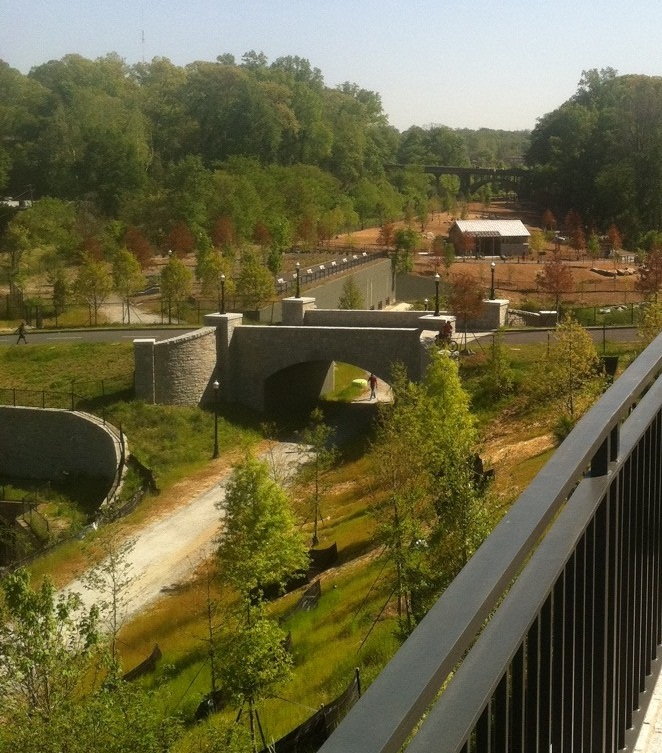
Looking south, new bridge over Clear Creek in the new section of the park, with the new dog park in the background

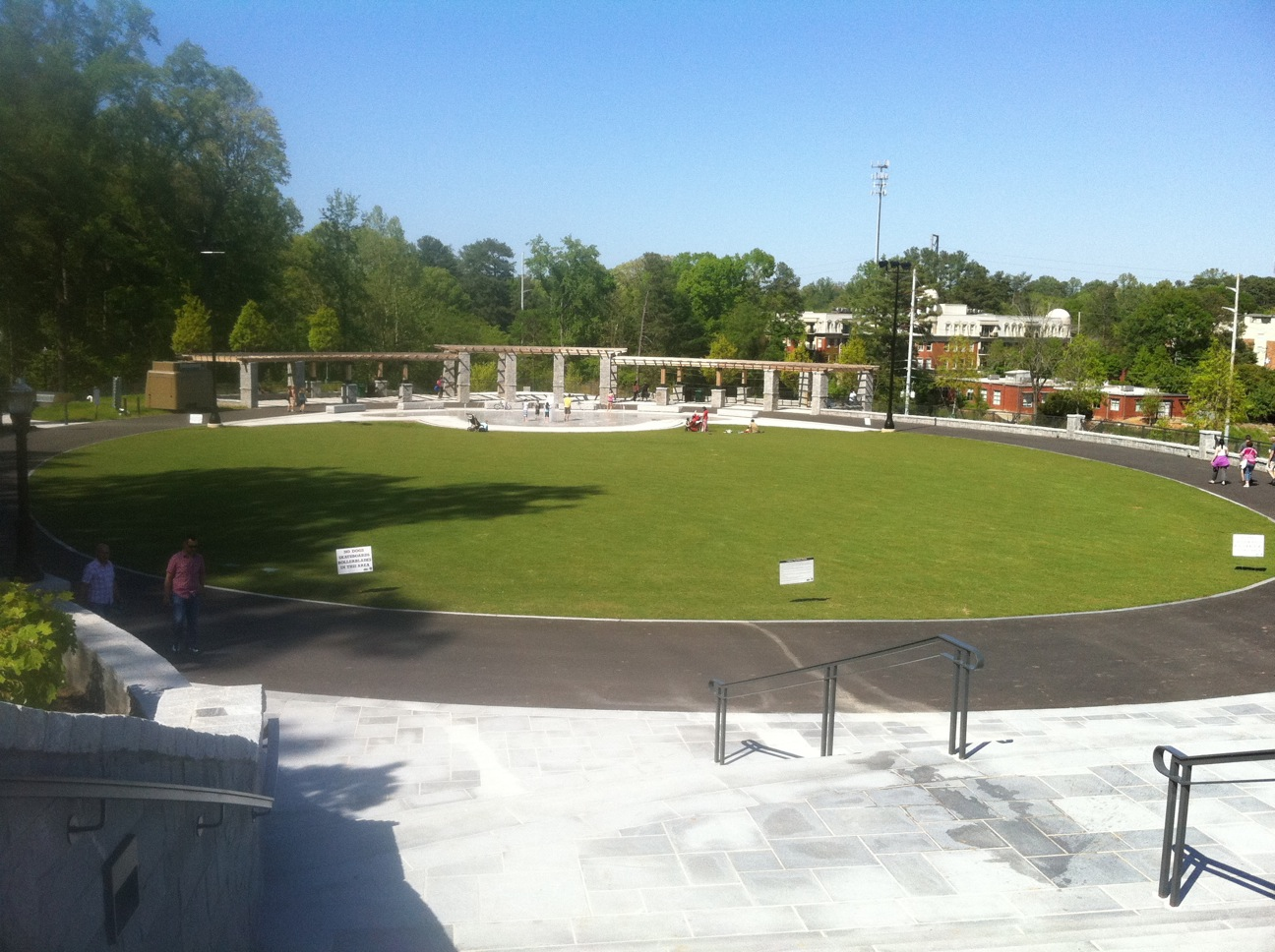
"Greensward", looking north at northern plaza with interactive fountain in the background

Approximately 50 acres (20 ha) in the northwest portion of the 187-acre (76 ha) park had remained woodlands into the 21st century. In 2007, a park expansion plan called for a new parking deck as well as "open green space, bicycle and walking trails, formal and community gardens, an interactive water feature, children's playgrounds, a skate park, athletic fields, and woodlands". The project was expected to cost $72 million.

On April 23, 2008, a ground-breaking ceremony was held at the Bathhouse for the 53-acre (21 ha) expansion of the park. The pool and bathhouse are part of a huge Leadership in Energy and Environmental Design (LEED) renovation as part of a $41 million capital campaign. The Piedmont Park Aquatic Center reopened in 2009, and Greystone, the park's bathhouse, reopened the same year for $6.1 million. The renovation features accessibility, a warming kitchen, WiFi, a pool with beach entry, bubblers, current channel, vortex, fountains, separate splash pad, lap lanes, landscaped deck environment, and concessions. A bocce court opened in early 2010.

On April 12, 2011, Mayor Kasim Reed cut the ribbon to open the first phase of a major expansion into the northern third of the park. Areas opened include two oval-shaped plazas ("The Greensward" and "The Promenade", which contains the interactive Legacy Fountain), the Lower Meadow, the Six Springs Wetlands, and a vastly expanded dog park.

==== Later expansions ====
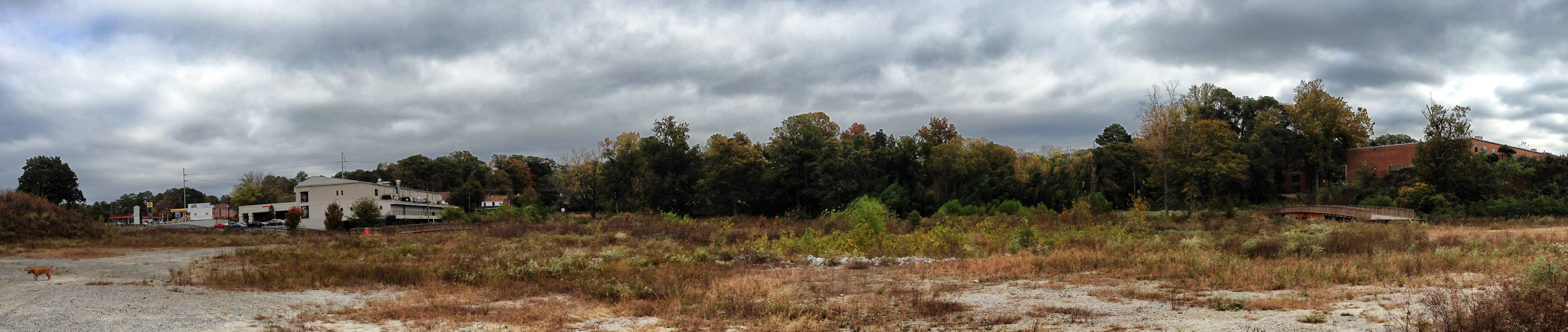
Piedmont Commons, northernmost section of the park, under development in October 2012. Panoramic shot with Piedmont Avenue at left.
Left middle, bridge to future Monroe Drive ped. entrance. Right, bridge to future Dutch Valley Place ped. entrance.

Construction began in early 2013 on areas at the far north of the park, including The Northwoods, Piedmont Commons, and Piedmont Gardens. New park entrances are to be added at the eastern end of Westminster Dr. (off Piedmont Ave.), the northern end of Dutch Valley Pl., and at 1514 Monroe just south of Piedmont Ave., on the site of Agnes & Muriel's restaurant. Mayor Kasim Reed announced plans in 2018 for a $100 million renovation of Piedmont Park, which were approved by the Atlanta City Council that May. Nelson Byrd Woltz was hired in 2024 to design a master plan for the park, details of which the Atlanta government and the Piedmont Park Conservancy announced the next year. The plan includes new bike lanes, service roads, pathways, recreation courts, and picnic areas, along with a dredging of Lake Clara Meer.

=== Piedmont Park Conservancy ===
The Piedmont Park Conservancy is a 501(c)(3) nonprofit organization that manages roughly 90 percent of the park's daily maintenance and security under a public–private partnership with the City of Atlanta. A predecessor group, Friends of Piedmont Park, formed in 1983 after a city-commissioned master plan recommended an outside fundraising partner; the Conservancy itself was organized in June 1989 by Midtown residents, business leaders, and activists, led by retired Coca-Cola executive Mike Semrau, in response to the park's deteriorating condition. In 1992 the Conservancy and the city signed a memorandum of understanding formalizing the partnership, a structure modeled on the Central Park Conservancy in New York.

The Conservancy's fundraising has paid for much of the park's physical turnaround. A $6.1 million project restored the park's 1911 bathhouse, which reopened in 2009 as the events venue Greystone alongside a rebuilt swimming pool and refurbished Lake Clara Meer, while a separate $41 million campaign developed roughly 53 acres of long-unused woodland into the Piedmont Commons area, adding an interactive fountain, restored meadows, and the daylighting of a previously culverted stretch of Clear Creek. By 2009 the Conservancy, with a staff of 32, managed about 90 percent of the park's maintenance, security, and facility operations, while the city's own contribution to operating costs was about $175,000 a year; annual visitation was then estimated at roughly 3 million, a figure the Conservancy projected could reach 5 million once the expansion was complete. The head of Park Pride, an Atlanta park-advocacy nonprofit, described Piedmont Park as the city's flagship park and a model for what other Atlanta parks could become, while also noting that the Conservancy's fundraising success can make it harder for smaller park conservancies elsewhere in the city to compete for donor support. The Conservancy also runs recurring public programming, including a Saturday "Green Market" and the EnviroVentures summer day camp, and in 2024 launched a multi-year tree-canopy initiative to inventory and improve the health of the park's roughly 3,000 trees. By the Conservancy's own accounting it has invested more than $110 million in capital improvements in the park since 1989, and it was a lead partner, alongside the City of Atlanta, in the 20-year comprehensive master plan for the park unveiled in 2025.

By 2009 the Conservancy had raised about $65 million over the prior 12 years and was spending more than $3 million annually to operate the park; a 2007 National Park Service report on best practices in urban parks cited it as a model alongside conservancies for Central Park, Golden Gate Park, and Chicago's Millennium Park. The public–private arrangement has also drawn criticism: Doug Abramson, who helped found the Conservancy before breaking with the group, unsuccessfully sued to block a Conservancy-backed parking deck, and other critics, including urban planner and former Conservancy member Aaron Worthy, argued that converting park facilities into rental venues such as Greystone and Magnolia Hall risked making the public park exclusionary. A similar tension surfaced in 2018, when a sinkhole beneath a Conservancy-owned building leased to restaurant operators led to a lawsuit alleging the Conservancy had concealed an engineer's report on the damage; a Fulton County jury delivered a split verdict in February 2025, finding that both sides had breached the lease and that neither had acted in bad faith.

As of fiscal year 2024, the Conservancy reported $6.56 million in revenue and $5.2 million in expenses, drawing most of its income from donations, with venue rentals and program fees making up most of the remainder. Doug Widener, previously executive director of the Lincoln Park Conservancy in Chicago, became president and CEO in October 2023, succeeding Mark Banta, who had led the organization since 2014.

== Activities and facilities ==
=== Outdoor activities ===
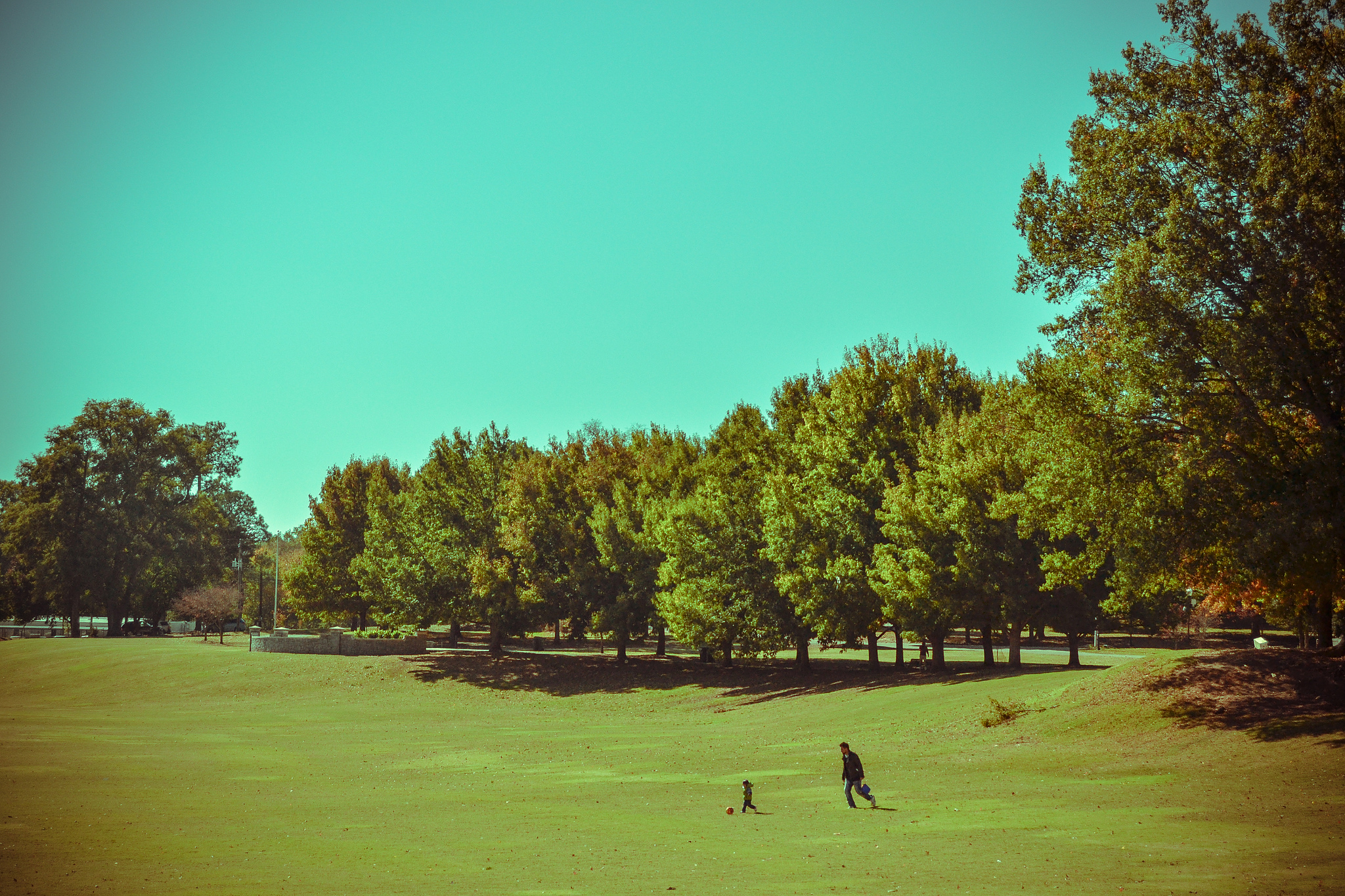
The meadow in Piedmont Park

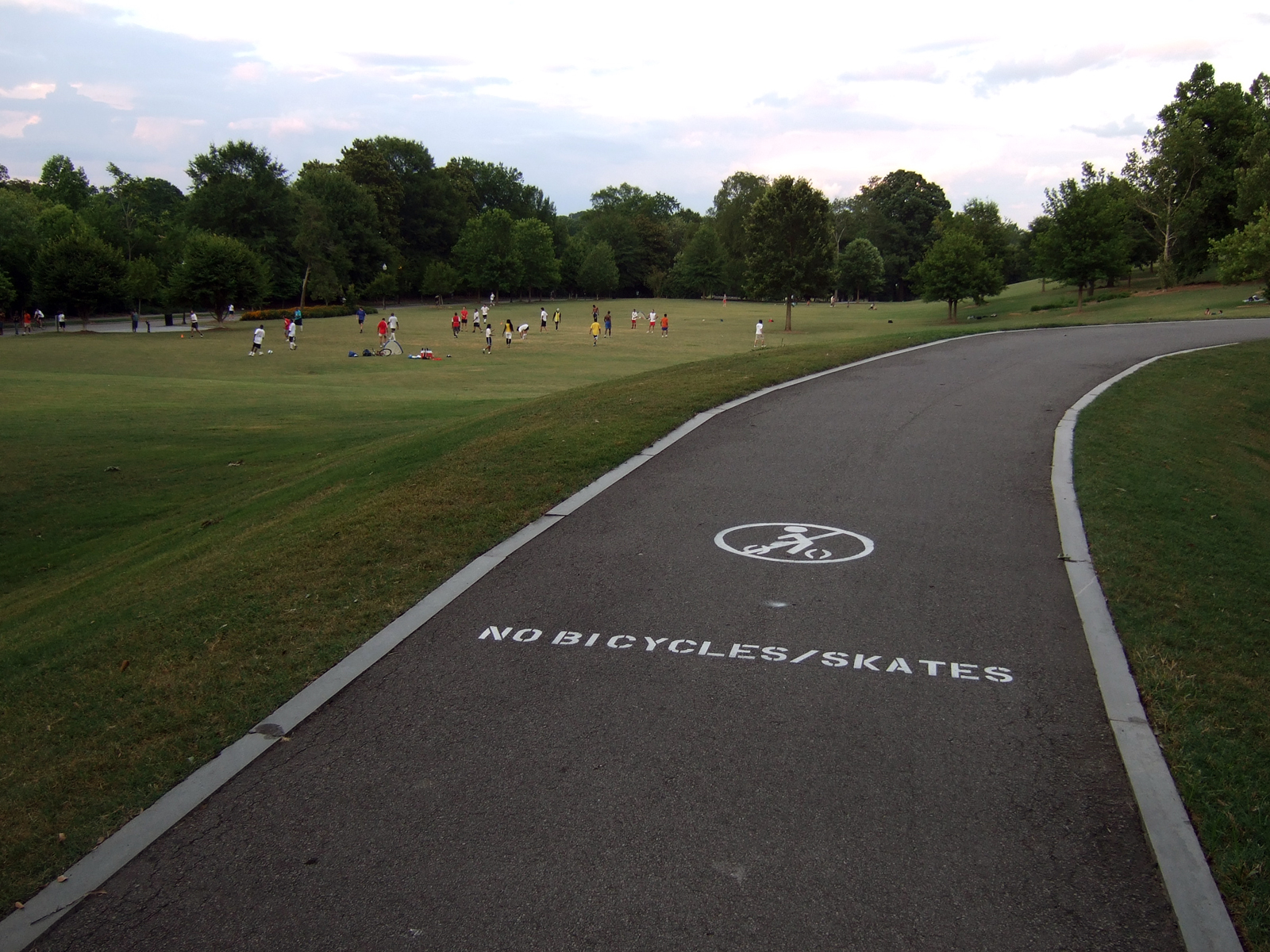
A walking path in Piedmont Park

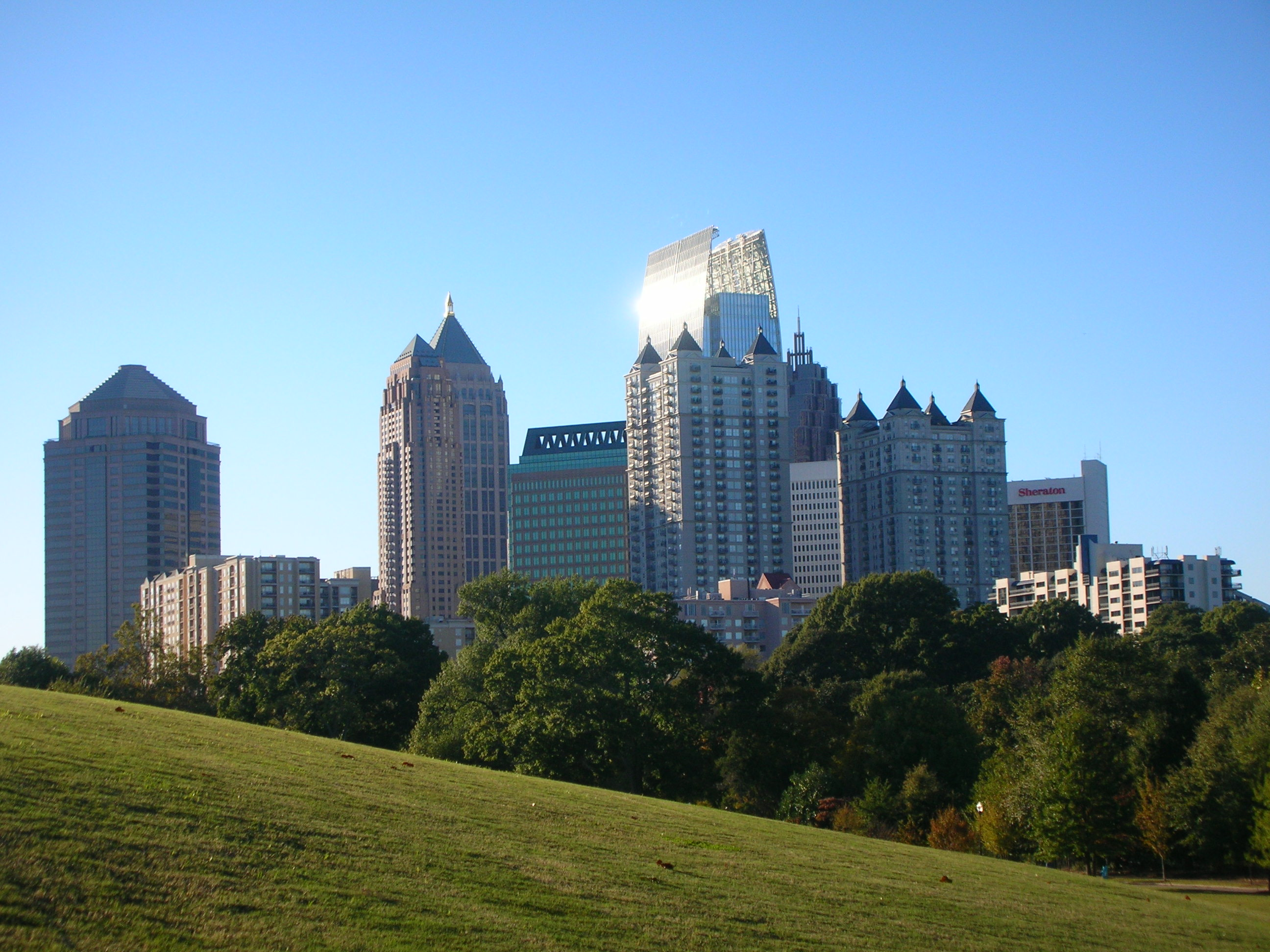
Part of the park with the Midtown Skyline behind

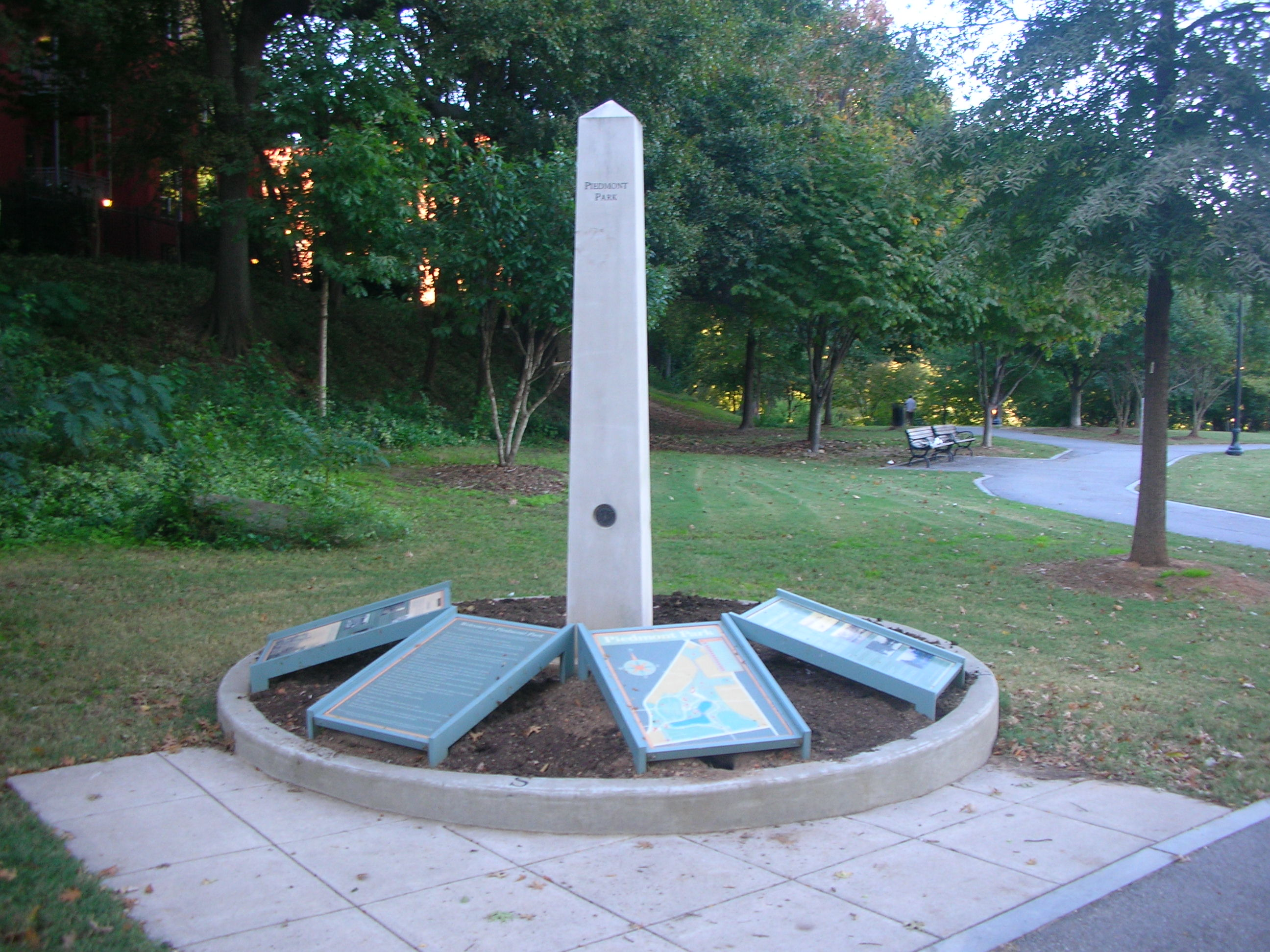
A monument in the park

The park hosts several miles of paved paths suitable for walking, running, biking, and inline skating. Skate Escape across from the park at the 12th Street entrance rents both bikes and skates. On weekend afternoons, skateboarders and inline skaters often share the open, paved area inside the 12th Street entrance.

Piedmont Park has picnic shelters located just to the East of the north soccer field. There are also various picnic tables and benches throughout the park. Many visitors choose to picnic on the expansive lawns as well. The first grill in Piedmont Park was erected for the 1895 Cotton States Exposition where the administrative offices now sit. There are 22 grills throughout the park. No portable grills are allowed.

The Noguchi "Playscape" is located near the 12th Street Gate. The geometrically shaped, modernist playground includes a soaring swing set, slide, sand pit, climbing dome and more made of bright and exciting colors. Also in the park is a new playground known as Mayor's Grove. It was designed as a Boundless Playgrounds and features a high level of accessibility and interactive play.

=== Sports ===
Piedmont Park is a popular place for organized sports. The Sharon E. Lester Tennis Center at Piedmont Park is a fully staffed, public facility with 12 lighted hard courts, offering leagues, lessons, and supplies.

The Active Oval has two softball fields, two soccer fields, and two beach volleyball courts, all ringed by a dirt running path. Kickball leagues also use the softball fields. The park also has a swimming center.

=== Fishing and the lake ===
The lake is located in the south east part of the park. Fishing is permitted in the lake, which is stocked with large mouth bass, crappie, bream, and catfish. A 2002 renovation of the lake added a new bridge connecting the two bodies of water and three fishing piers located around the lake.

Clara Meer Dock is located at the west corner of the lake. Just above the Dock sits the historic Visitor Center building. Clara Meer Dock forms an amphitheater-like space nestled into the western end of the lake. Clara Meer Dock is often used for wedding ceremonies. Rental of the dock also includes the Visitor Center. The Visitor Center features a barrel ceiling with a painted mural called "A Day at the Park" by Ralph Gilbert. The center seats 40 persons inside and over 200 more on the adjoining lawn and dock. The Dock seats up to 120 for ceremony, or up to 100 for table dining or possible dance floor area.

=== Dogs ===
Dogs are permitted in Piedmont Park but must generally be leashed, except for special events and if they are in the Piedmont Park Dog Parks. The latter consists of fenced-in dog parks covering 3 acres (1.2 ha) for small and large dogs. The Piedmont Park Conservancy (a nonprofit) was responsible for the restoration of the Piedmont Park Dog Parks, and still manages the dog parks today.

=== Special events ===
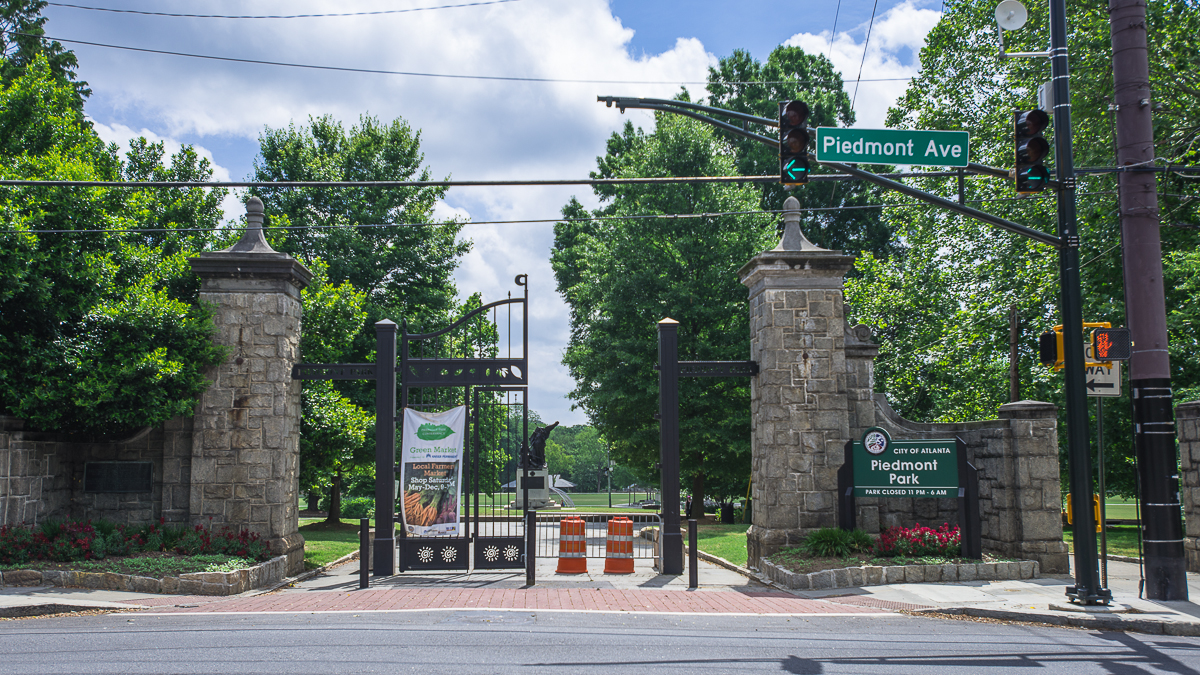
Main entrance

Piedmont Park is home to various annual celebrations and events, including Atlanta Pride Festival, the Atlanta Jazz Festival, the Atlanta Dogwood Festival, Music Midtown, Atlanta Black Pride, and Festival Peachtree Latino. A summer series of classic films, Screen on the Green, is also aired in the park for local residents. The Peachtree Road Race finishes at Piedmont Park.

On the weekend and holidays, the park comes alive with music, intramural sports, and fun festivities. In 2004, Georgia Shakespeare Festival added an annual series of free performances entitled "Shake on the Lake" with Lake Clara Meer as a backdrop. A centennial celebration was held for the park in June 2004. In 2007, the Allman Brothers Band and Dave Matthews Band played a concert with proceeds benefiting the planned expansion to the park. Dave Matthews Band's performance was later released as a live DVD as well as their eighth live album, Live at Piedmont Park. Sir Paul McCartney performed in Piedmont Park to benefit the conservancy on August 15, 2009. The Eagles performed at the park on October 16, 2010, also as a benefit for the conservancy. In 2011, Music Midtown returned from its five-year hiatus, hosting headliners Coldplay and The Black Keys in Piedmont Park, however the 2022 concert was cancelled due to a lawsuit concerning firearms access.

== See also ==
- 10-minute walk
- Park conservancy
