= Festival Peachtree Latino =

Coordinates: 33.782578°N 84.371256°W

Festival Peachtree Latino is an ethnic festival held annually at Piedmont Park in Atlanta, Georgia, United States. The festival, which celebrates Hispanic-American culture, is the largest multicultural event in the entire Southeast. The festival features arts and crafts, family activities, sporting events, a parade, dance demonstrations, ethnic foods, and a live music stage featuring international performers from Mexico, Puerto Rico, Colombia, Venezuela, and the Dominican Republic. In addition, over 250 exhibitors present favorite brands, souvenirs and interactive displays. The festival, which began in 2000, continues to grow in attendance. It is free and open to the public.

This festival went on hiatus in 2020.

== See also ==
- Culture of Atlanta
- Tourism in Atlanta
