= Istanbul Center =

Non-profit organization

Headquarters: Two Midtown Plaza Suite 1010 1349 W Peachtree St NW Atlanta, GA 30309 Milton Branch: Motto: Creating a Legacy of Understanding Established: 2002 Membership: No membership, open to public President: Executive Director:

Istanbul Center is non-profit organization headquartered in Atlanta, Georgia, and has branches in several cities in the Southeastern United States. Istanbul Center is inspired by the works and actions of scholars, thinkers and activists like, among others, Fethullah Gülen, Rumi and Martin Luther King Jr. Established to promote better understanding and closer relations among the communities in Metro Atlanta and the Southeastern United States, the center focuses on four major areas: education, culture, dialogue and humanitarian works. It is a volunteer-driven, locally funded civic organization.

== Overview ==
Since its inception Istanbul Center has served the society through many successful activities that are varied in size and scope. It was first established as Istanbul Cultural Center, a unit of Global Spectrum Foundation, to serve the Turkish-American community in Metro Atlanta. The size of the Turkish community in Metro Atlanta is estimated to be over ten thousand which is expected to grow in the coming years. The general public's attendance and participation in its events has shown that there is a great interest in Atlanta community for Turkish culture. Later, the center changed its name to Istanbul Center for Culture and Dialogue as it embraced the whole community and involved in dialogue activities. As its activities and scope went beyond cultural and dialogue related activities its name was finalized as Istanbul Center. Istanbul Center is "a tangible symbol of Atlanta's international growth; its programs are indicative of one culture's attempts to bring about greater understanding of its lifestyle and faith traditions".

== Education ==
The center provides learning opportunities for K-12 students on a variety of subjects such as language, science and art classes during school periods as well as summer times through summer schools and camps. The center also organizes seminars and lectures for adults through partnership with departments and student organizations in universities. Istanbul Center organizes Annual Art and Essay Contests that addresses all the middle and high school students in Metro Atlanta with the partnership of educational institutions and civic organizations.

== Dialogue ==
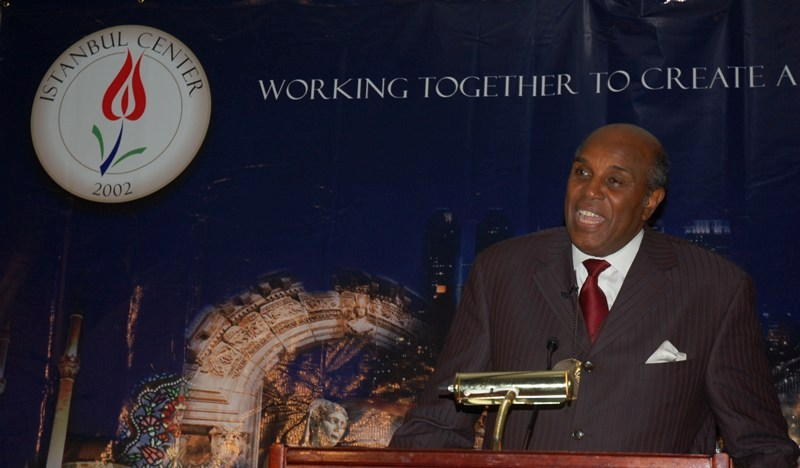
Dr. Gerald Durley, keynote speaker of 2007 Dialogue Dinner

Istanbul Center also has been in dialogue with faith and community leaders in Atlanta and the surrounding areas. One of the significant dialogue events is Istanbul Dialogue Night which is a monthly get-together organized to create a relaxed social environment where members of different communities can develop friendships with each other. For these nights the center invites community leaders and professors as speakers to share their opinions about various issues that are related to our society. Istanbul Center's Annual Dialogue Dinners are becoming a tradition for prominent leaders of Atlanta to meet on common grounds. Also, the center organizes dialogue trips to Turkey for community leaders and university professors.

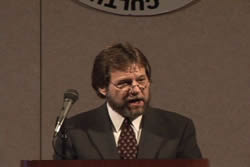
Bill Bolling, keynote speaker of 2006 Dialogue Dinner

Some of the dialogue principles of the center are:

- Focus on similarities while acknowledging genuine differences.
- Respect everyone's God-given right to choose what they believe. It is possible to respect someone while not agreeing with them on every issue.
- Work hard to remove misunderstandings and take the first step when necessary.
- Do not engage in debates because a debate implies a winning and a losing side. Dialogue should result in both sides winning by improving their understanding.
- Do not engage in political discourse since political differences often result in highlighting dissimilarities and feelings of anger. Instead, focus on universal and timeless human values.

== Culture ==
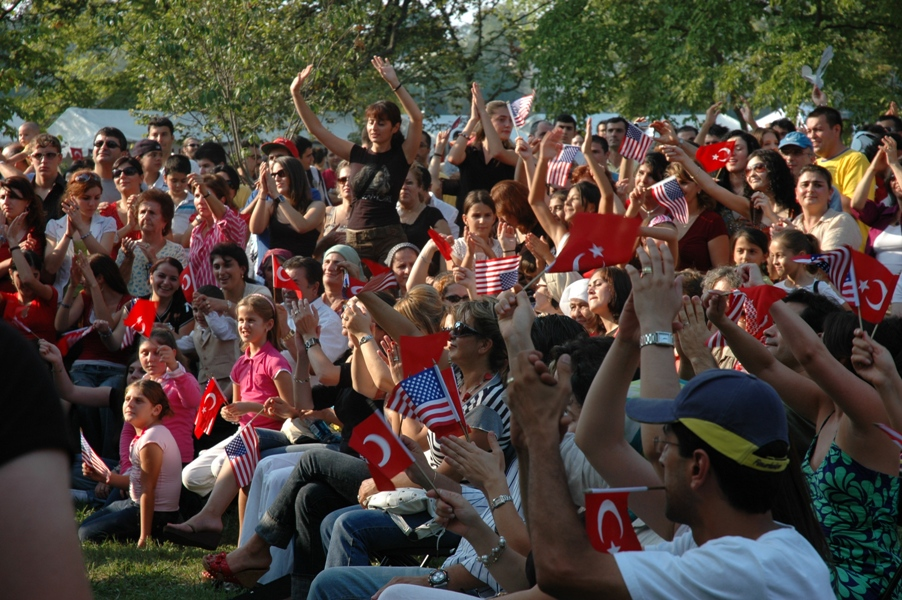
Atlanta Turkish Festival 2007

Istanbul Center has been very active in promoting Turkish culture in Atlanta and in facilitating understanding and interaction between the Turkish and American communities. Atlanta Turkish Festival annually organized in fall, food festivals, cooking classes, art and handcraft exhibits, music and dance performances are some of its most popular activities which attract thousands of people. The center organizes Rumi Nights in several southeastern cities.

== Humanitarian works ==
The center organizes relief programs for disaster victims such as victims of Katrina and Rita hurricanes, tornadoes in Americus, GA and Enterprise, Alabama. Donations and food drives are organized besides volunteering at Atlanta Community Food Bank and several homeless shelters.

== Choice of name ==
Istanbul is a city where more than 15 million people with various backgrounds, languages, religions and cultures live together in peace. It is a city that connects the continents of Europe and Asia via its many bridges. It is a meeting place where new ideas and concepts from both continents intermingle on a stage provided by the hills of a city with decorated monuments. Most importantly, Istanbul is a city that represents civilization and peaceful coexistence. Istanbul Center was established to live up to the ideals its name represents.
