= Yellow Daisy Festival =

Arts and crafts festival in Georgia

Coordinates: 33.812°N 84.145°W

The Yellow Daisy Festival is an arts and crafts festival held in Stone Mountain, Georgia. The 56th annual festival will be held in 2025 on September 4th through the 7th.

== History ==
The Yellow Daisy Festival is named after the Confederate yellow daisy (Helianthus porteri). The festival began in 1968 and has become an annual celebration. It is held Thursday-Sunday following Labor Day. (USA). The Yellow Daisy Festival started out as a small event, but has since grown into a four-day fair.

There was a virtual festival in 2020.

== Attractions and entertainment ==
Festival attendance is approximately 200,000 people. Vendors offer furniture, glass, games, food, paintings, jewelry, and sculptures. For entertainment, there are live bands and DJs, most of whom play rock and roll and bluegrass.
