= Virginia–Highland Summerfest =

Annual arts festival in Intown Atlanta

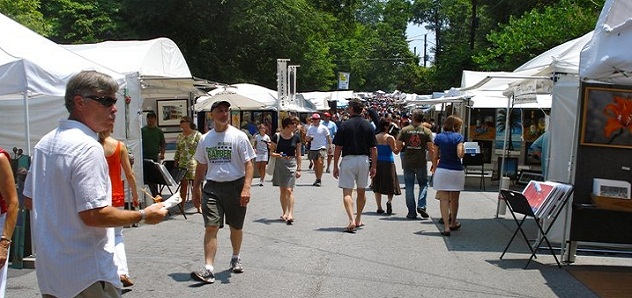
Art market, Summerfest 2011

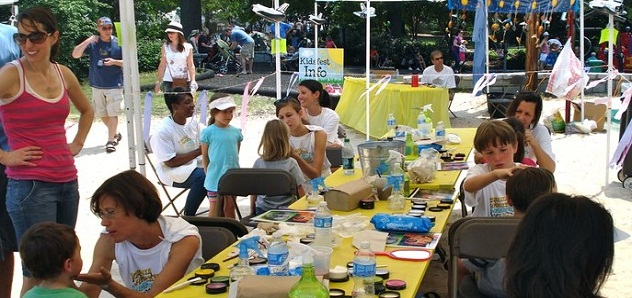
KidsFest, Summerfest 2011

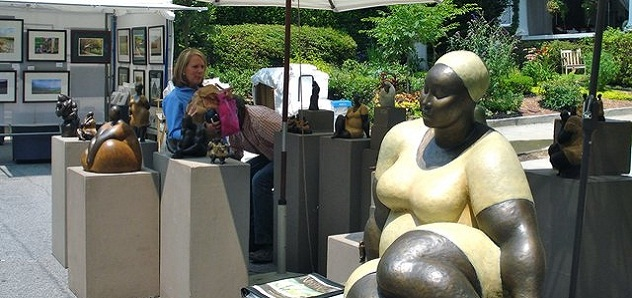
Art market, Summerfest 2011

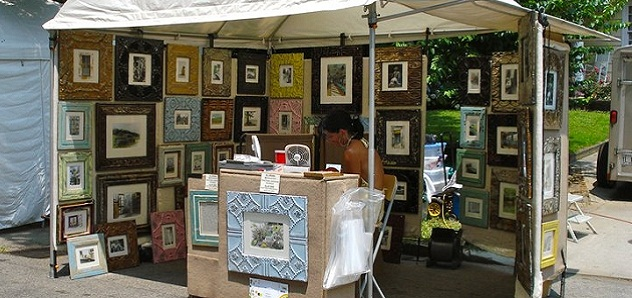
Art market, Summerfest 2011

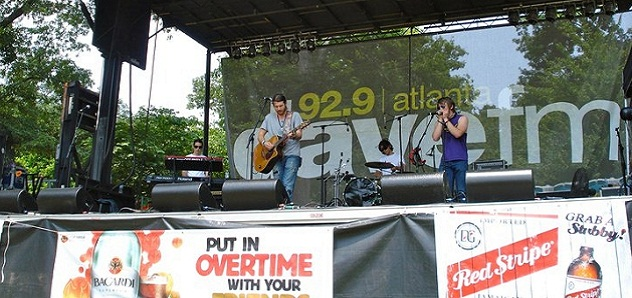
dave fm music stage, Summerfest 2011

Summerfest is an annual arts festival in the Virginia–Highland neighborhood of Intown Atlanta, taking place on two days in June each year. It is one of the largest art festivals in the Southeastern United States, typically attended by more than 50,000 visitors and showcasing more than 200 artists from across the region.

In addition to art it features music (on the "dave fm" stage), food, KidsFest, and for neighborhood residents, a parade, dinner and movie. It is the main source of funding (over $100,000) for the activities of the Virginia–Highland Civic Association, which spends it on parks, schools, the firehouse and other community organizations.

== History ==
Summerfest began as a block party with Atkins Park restaurant owner Warren Bruno and other local businesses in 1984. The party took place between St. Charles and Greenwood Avenues along N. Highland Avenue.

In 1986 the event expanded along N. Highland Ave. to include stages at the intersections with Virginia Ave., Amsterdam Ave., and University Drive in the Morningside neighborhood.

In 1987 Star 94 radio was added as a sponsor and an art show was added at Virginia Avenue.

Bruno stated in an interview that in the 1980s there was a lot of animosity between residents and businesses in Virginia–Highland and the festival was a way for businesses to "give back" to the community.

In 1988 the Civic Association took over the event, though the businesses stayed involved. Restaurants set up tasting booths in John Howell Park. A Kidsfest was added to bring back the family component in the celebration.

In 1999 Creative Loafing Atlanta voted Summerfest Atlanta's Best Neighborhood Festival.

In 2000, a spat among organizers and a shakeup in the organizing committee made local headlines, but nonetheless Summerfest did continue as usual in 2001.

In 2008 Summerfest celebrated its 25th anniversary.

In 2009 the festival was second only to the Inman Park festival for the Creative Loafing accolade of Best Neighborhood Festival.

2020 saw no festival.
