= Screen on the Green (Washington, D.C.) =

Screen on the Green was an annual summertime outdoor film festival in Washington, D.C. hosted by HBO and Comcast. The free outdoor screenings were usually held on Monday nights in July and August and started at sunset (approximately 8:30 p.m.)

The movies were usually projected onto a theater-size portable screen on the National Mall between 7th and 12th Streets, Northwest. Organizers cancelled Screen on the Green in 2016 when HBO and Comcast ended their sponsorship of the event, stating that they needed their resources for other projects.

== 2015 films ==
Screen on the Green showed the following films in 2015:

- July 20 (Monday) – North by Northwest (1959)
- July 27 (Monday) – The Poseidon Adventure (1972)
- August 3 (Monday) – Desk Set (1957)
- August 10 (Monday) – Back to the Future (1985)

== 2014 films ==
Screen on the Green showed the following films in 2014:

- July 21 (Monday) – The Karate Kid (1984)
- July 28 (Monday) – Lover Come Back (1961)
- August 4 (Monday) – Key Largo (1948)
- August 11 (Monday) – A Soldier's Story (1984)

== 2013 films ==
Screen on the Green showed the following films in 2013:

- July 22 (Monday) – E.T. the Extra-Terrestrial (1982)
- July 29 (Monday) – Norma Rae (1979)
- August 5 (Monday) – Willy Wonka & the Chocolate Factory (1971)
- August 12 (Monday) – Tootsie (1982)

== 2012 films ==
Screen on the Green showed the following films in 2012:

- July 16 (Monday) – Butch Cassidy and the Sundance Kid (1969)
- July 25 (Wednesday) – It Happened One Night (1934)
- July 30 (Monday) – From Here to Eternity (1953)
- August 6 (Monday) – Psycho (1960)

== 2011 films ==
Screen on the Green showed the following films in 2011:

- July 25 – In the Heat of the Night (1967)
- August 1 – One Flew Over the Cuckoo’s Nest (1975)
- August 8 – Gentlemen Prefer Blondes (1953)
- August 15 – Cool Hand Luke (1967)

== 2010 films ==
Screen on the Green showed the following films in 2010:

- July 12 – Goldfinger (1964)
- July 19 – The Goodbye Girl (1977)
- July 26 – 12 Angry Men (1957)
- August 2 – Bonnie and Clyde (1967)

== 2009 films ==
On May 12, 2009, HBO announced that it was cancelling its sponsorship of Screen on the Green, and the future of the popular outdoor movie series was in doubt while another sponsor was sought.

Almost immediately, a Facebook fan group appeared, rallying a grassroots effort to save "Screen on the Green". Led by Jesse B Rauch, President and Founder of "Friends of Screen on the Green," over 2,500 Facebook users subscribed to the group. A massive e-mail campaign was launched to find new sponsors, and on June 10, 2009, Comcast and the Trust for the National Mall announced they would join forces with Time Warner's HBO to bring back Screen on the Green to the National Mall in the summer of 2009.

Screen on the Green showed the following films in 2009:

- July 20 – Close Encounters of the Third Kind (1977)
- July 27 – Dog Day Afternoon (1975)
- August 3 – On the Waterfront (1954)
- August 10 – Rebel Without a Cause (1955)

== 2008 films ==
Screen on the Green showed the following films in 2008:

- July 14 – Dr. No (1962)
- July 21 – The Candidate (1972)
- July 28 – Arsenic and Old Lace (1944)
- August 4 – The Apartment (1960)
- August 11 – Superman (1978)

== 2007 films ==
Screen on the Green showed the following films in 2007:

- July 16 – Annie Hall (1977)
- July 23 – The Thing from Another World (1951)
- July 30 – Wait Until Dark (1967)
- August 6 – All the King's Men (1949)
- August 13 – Casablanca (1942)

== 2006 films ==
Screen on the Green showed the following films in 2006:

- July 17 – The Day the Earth Stood Still (1951)
- July 24 – The Band Wagon (1953)
- July 31 – Bullitt (1968)
- August 7 – To Have and Have Not (1944)
- August 14 – Rocky (1976)

== 2005 films ==
Screen on the Green showed the following films in 2005:

- July 18 – The Way We Were (1973)
- July 25 – The Treasure of Sierra Madre (1948)
- August 1 – Suspicion (1941)
- August 8 – Who's Afraid of Virginia Woolf (1966)
- August 15 – The Big Sleep (1946)

== 2004 films ==
Screen on the Green showed the following films in 2004

- July 19 – All the President's Men (1976)
- July 26 – Dr. Jekyll and Mr. Hyde (1941)
- August 2 – What Ever Happened to Baby Jane? (1962)
- August 9 – The Thin Man (1934)
- August 16 – Mr. Smith Goes to Washington (1939)

== 2003 films ==
Screen on the Green showed the following films in 2003

- July 14 – Cat on a Hot Tin Roof (1958)
- July 21 – The Postman Always Rings Twice (1946)
- July 28 – Mutiny on the Bounty (1935)
- August 4 – Jailhouse Rock (1957)
- August 11 – 2001: A Space Odyssey (1968)

== 2002 films ==
Screen on the Green showed the following films in 2002

- July 15 – On the Town (1949)
- July 22 – Strangers on a Train (1951)
- July 29 – Blackboard Jungle (1955)
- August 5 – The Yearling (1946)
- August 12 – Viva Las Vegas (1964)

== 2001 films ==
Screen on the Green showed the following films in 2001

- July 9 – An American in Paris (1951)
- July 16 – A Streetcar Named Desire (1951)
- July 23 – A Patch of Blue (1965)
- August 5 – The Maltese Falcon (1941)
- August 8 – Meet Me in St. Louis (1944)

== 2000 films ==
Screen on the Green showed the following films in 2000

- July 14 – Singin' in the Rain (1952)
- July 24 – The Adventures of Robin Hood (1938)
- July 31 – The Philadelphia Story (1940)
- August 7 – Forbidden Planet (1956)
- August 14 – North by Northwest (1959)

== 1999 films ==
Screen on the Green showed the following films in 1999

- July 12 – Casablanca (1942)
- July 19 – The Wizard of Oz (1939)
- July 26 – Citizen Kane (1941)
- August 2 – King Kong (1933)
- August 9 – Rebel Without a Cause (1955)
