= Screen on the Green (Atlanta) =

Outdoor summer movie festival in Atlanta, Georgia

Screen on the Green is an annual summertime event held in Atlanta's Piedmont Park. Initially sponsored by Turner Classic Movies, the event has been hosted in recent years by the local Atlanta television station Peachtree TV. Screen on the Green consists of free movies shown on a large screen outdoors. The event typically draws between 5,000 and 10,000 people for each film. Through the 2007 series screen, tents, glass containers, pets, and grills are not allowed at the event.

Due to a drought that affected Piedmont Park during the 2008 and 2009 seasons, the event was temporarily moved to Centennial Olympic Park. It returned to Piedmont Park for the 2010 season.

In 2010, several of the early movies were disrupted by altercations including several acts of random violence. While additional security was provided for later movies, many long-time attendees were shaken by the events.

In 2011, Screen on the Green was cancelled because of lack of funding from Peachtree TV after a management change. Weeks later, Screen on the Green was saved by new sponsors. It was canceled again in 2012. In 2013, the event was held in Centennial Olympic Park.

== 2011 movies ==
- June 2 - Back to the Future
- June 9 - Imitation of Life
- June 16 - Sixteen Candles
- June 23 - Viewers Choice – The Birds, 1963 vs. Frankenstein, 1931
- June 30 - Willy Wonka & the Chocolate Factory

== 2010 movies ==
- May 27 --- National Treasure
- June 3 --- Transformers: Revenge of the Fallen
- June 10 --- Dreamgirls
- June 17 --- Star Wars Episode IV: A New Hope
- June 24 --- Jurassic Park

== 2009 movies ==
- May 28 --- Back to the Future
- June 4 --- Dreamgirls (not played due to inclement weather)
- June 11 --- Field of Dreams
- June 18 --- Home Alone
- June 25 --- Ghostbusters (decided by online vote)

== 2008 movies ==
- May 29 --- Jaws
- June 5 --- Big Momma's House
- June 12 --- Chicago
- June 19 --- E.T. the Extra-Terrestrial
- June 26 --- Footloose (decided by online vote)

== 2007 movies ==
- May 31 --- Casablanca
- June 7 --- Car Wash
- June 14 --- Butch Cassidy and the Sundance Kid
- June 21 --- Funny Girl
- June 28 --- E.T. the Extra-Terrestrial (not played due to rain and inclement weather)

== 2006 movies ==
- June 1 --- Houseguest
- June 8 --- The Wiz
- June 15 --- Ferris Bueller's Day Off
- June 21 --- Breakfast at Tiffany's
- June 28 --- Willy Wonka & the Chocolate Factory

== 2005 movies ==
- June 2 --- Some Like It Hot
- June 9 --- To Kill a Mockingbird
- June 16 --- The Birds
- June 23 --- Mommie Dearest
- June 30 --- Grease
