= Jim Alexander (photographer) =

American photographer

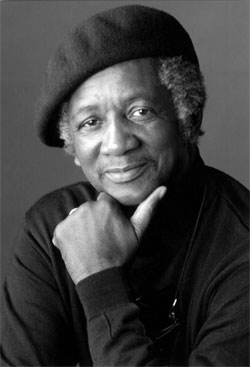
- Born: August 7, 1935 (age 90); Waldwick, New Jersey, U.S.
- Years active: 1950s–present
- Known for: Photography

Jim Alexander (born August 7, 1935) is an American documentary photographer, photojournalist, activist, and teacher who is best known for being a "Participant Observer" and his photographs of human rights and black culture. In 1995, he was the first artist selected in the annual "Master Artist" program conducted by the City of Atlanta Department of Cultural Affairs. He would later be inducted into The HistoryMakers in 2006.

== Early life ==
Alexander was born James Alexander on August 7, 1935, in Waldwick, New Jersey as one of 12 children to auto mechanic David Alexander, and Frances James Alexander. He attended Waldwick Public School and Ramsey High School. He grew up during a time where the opportunities for Blacks in America to economically advance were few.

== Career ==
=== Beginnings ===
In 1952, Alexander joined the U.S. Navy at the age of 17. During his time in Naval boot camp at United States Naval Training Center Bainbridge, one event would help shape the course of his entire life; Alexander won his first camera, a Kodak "Brownie Hawkeye" in a friendly dice game. Immediately putting his new camera to use, Alexander sold photographs to the other sailors for fifty cents each.

Once he finished boot camp, he was transferred to a naval base in Charleston, S.C. to begin training as a diesel engineman. While in Charleston he asked the naval base photographer to look over some of his work, and he began teaching him about 35mm and large format photography. After leaving the Navy in 1956, Alexander put photography on hold for several years. He managed a pool hall and detailed cars. He lived above the pool hall, which was called a rooming house. The rooms were rented for $9 a week. That room and tiny bed became Alexander's home during what he called his "street time."

In 1964 he moved to Ridgewood, New Jersey from Paterson where he lived following his discharge and launched his professional career as a freelance photographer. Alexander completed courses for a certificate in business organization and management at Rutgers University, while he worked as general manager of a newspaper delivery service. He also enrolled at New York Institute of Photography (NYIP) and earned a degree in commercial photography in 1968. He later became a part of NYIP Famous Alumni

During the height of the human rights movement, Alexander began documenting the anti-war and civil rights movement, and later the local and national responses to Dr. Martin Luther King Jr.'s assassination in 1968. His photographs included: marches, rallies, conferences, meetings, festivals, concerts, and Black life as a whole. He entitled the body of work Spirits/Martyrs/Heroes and continued to add photographs to the collection over the ensuing years The collection ranges from the 1960s to the present. It encompasses a variety of subjects from the human and civil rights movement, politics, music, art, and everyday individuals who were consistent in their pursuit of equality.

On a bus trip from Ridgewood, New Jersey to New York, Alexander met Eric Maristany. They both were traveling with cameras, so conversation between the two sparked. Maristany worked at a filmstrip company in Ridgewood and invited Alexander to visit the studio. After visiting the studio a few days later, he met owner Richard Bruner, and staff of Bruner Productions; producers of educational and civil rights movement filmstrips. He became a volunteer at the studio after gaining respectability as a documentary photographer. Alexander began freelancing at Bruner Productions.

=== Music icons ===
Alexander is also known for his document of Black inspired music, prominently jazz and blues. When he photographed different events, he realized that the event would open with a musical selection. He started to appreciate the influence music had on the African American community, and it revealed the importance of musicians. "I am just a lover of music. There was a lot going on in the '50s and '60s, in New Jersey, where all the little clubs or corner bars had a trio or quartet playing. I was really listening to the music." He then decided he would incorporate black music in his work. In 1988, Alexander curated his own exhibit entitled Blues Legacy for the first National Black Arts Festival.

He curated the Duke and Other Legends: Jazz Photographs by Jim Alexander that same year. The exhibit featured 50 classical jazz musicians that toured 13 southern cities through a grant from the National Endowment for the Arts and the Southern Arts Federation. The resilience and creativity of African American culture captivates the world whether it is through music, art or the written word. Jazz music is just one example of the hatred and marginalization that was designed to break their spirits. Alexander juxtaposed images of the barriers created by hatred as well as the elegant strength of those who dare to shatter them. He has spent years documenting jazz musicians such as Duke Ellington, Ella Fitzgerald, and Count Basie just to name a few.

=== Gordon Parks ===
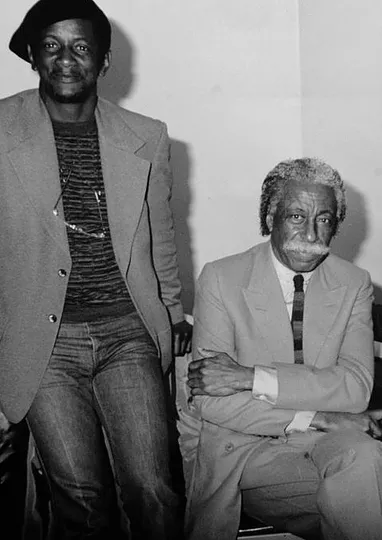
Jim Alexander with Gordon Parks Clark College, Atlanta, GA 1988

Alexander met and became friends with documentary photographer Gordon Parks in 1968. Parks was influential in the direction of his photographic career. "A photo can be taken to build, or it can be taken to destroy, and that decision rests in the hands of the photographer." Alexander recognized how his photographs could affect the awareness of the subject and the viewer.

Moved to dedicate ten years of his life and work to documenting human rights and the Black experience; he shared this intention with Parks. Parks said, "that sounds good James, but your ass is going to starve; nobody is going to pay you just to run around shooting anything that interests you." So Alexander decided to teach others the art of photography while shooting documentary work on the side. Parks approved his decision and told him, "That sounds better." Fifty plus years have surpassed since having that conversation with the late Gordon Parks, and Alexander continues his documentary work.

Alexander believes that each photo contains burrows that sends a message deep into the viewer's conscious. His photos have the aesthetic of a participant observer. As described by Alexander, "a participant observer acknowledges the undeniable influence of his mere presence, while pleading allegiance to the role of the spectator." Alexander's images help call attention to gross violations of human rights in the United States over the course of many decades.

=== Educator ===
Alexander has mentored and taught photography at various colleges and universities such as Yale University, Emory University, Fulton County Arts Council, Spelman College, TRIO and Upward Bound Programs at Clark College (better known as Clark Atlanta University), Morris Brown College, and Atlanta Metropolitan College.

In 1970, Alexander was hired as a consultant and photography instructor for Yale University's School of Art and Architecture's Black Environmental Studies Team (B.E.S.T) and The Black Workshop. He also served as executive director of a community arts organization from 1972 to 1976.

Atlanta became home to Alexander and his family in 1976 after he accepted a position as the director of audiovisual communications for the Atlanta Office of the Federation of Southern Cooperatives. This was a non-profit established to save, protect, and expand the landholdings of Black family farmers in the south.

At Clark College (better known as Clark Atlanta University), Alexander served as Photographer-in-Residence from 1984 to 1990. During his time at Clark Atlanta, Alexander established a mentoring program where he helped students who worked with the campus newspaper, yearbook, and various types of photography. He also documented meetings and events leading up to the historic ribbon cutting for the AU/CC CAU merger.

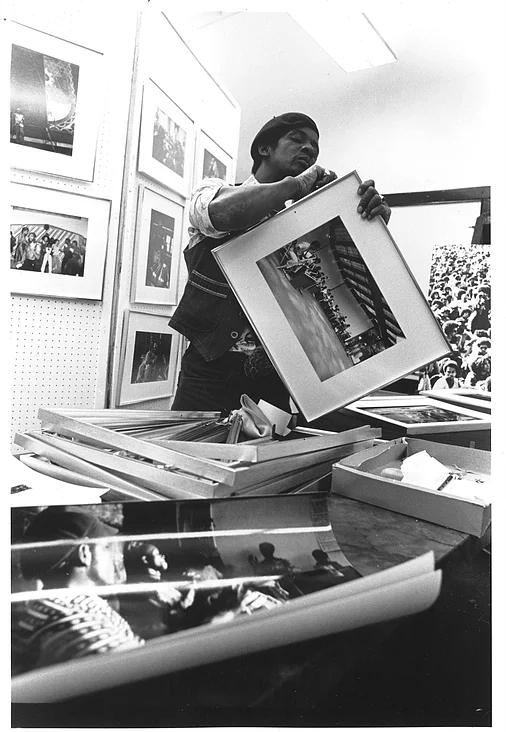
Self-portrait of Jim Alexander in his studio at The Neighborhood Arts Center Atlanta, GA 1978

The Neighborhood Arts Center (NAC) originated in 1975, and became the heart of Atlanta's Black Arts Movement. The center was constructed in the image of Atlanta's first African American Mayor, Maynard Jackson. In 1977, Alexander became photographer in residence at The NAC. He was proactive in maintaining the historical values The NAC instituted. In 1978, Alexander documented a historic visit to the NAC by Romare Bearden, a legendary artist and author, and his wife Nanette Bearden.

As a strong believer in "art for people's sake," Alexander established an organization called, Freedom Arts Communications Team (F.A.C.T. INC.) in 1972. F.A.C.T. was a collective of artists; musicians, visual artists, poets, media professionals, community advocates, theater group members, and mentors. By launching a community arts festival, working with schools, the Police Athletic League and community development offices, they created a visiting artist program to serve youth and adults in the New Haven, CT area.

From 1996 – 1999, Alexander was a coordinator and instructor of the youth photography program called "As Seen by Teens" photography and journalism program. As Seen by Teens was a summer photojournalism program designed to give young students a better sense of themselves and their communities. Implemented by Nexus Contemporary Art Center, the program encouraged creativity while it challenged students to learn and show self-respect, achieve goals, and gain a marketable skill.

From 1998 – 2000, Alexander was director of Arts for All gallery and Community Events. VSA arts of Georgia (formally Arts for All) provided arts education and cultural arts opportunities for Georgians with disabilities, or who are disadvantage or institutionalized.

=== First World Bookstore ===
The love for education, reading, and black culture led Alexander to be a co-founder of First World Bookstores in Atlanta, GA during 1988. The store specialized in predominately African American books, gifts, and art; which eventually expanded to five bookstores in the metropolitan area until 1994.

=== Jim-Alex Studio Gallery ===
While in New Haven, CT Alexander opened a photo studio, Jim-Alex Studio Gallery in 1971. He exhibited the works of other photographers as well as his own. The studio became a meeting place and hub for artists and activists of all kinds. Community meetings were frequently held there, and The Connecticut Black Media Coalition was established at his studio. Alexander jokes, "Everything happened in my studio but photography."

=== Organizations ===
Alexander has been instrumental in the founding of several organizations of professional photographers, including the Photographers' Collective, the Atlanta Photographers Group, and Zone Three. He is a founding member and past executive vice chairman of the National Black Media Coalition, and completed two terms as president of African Americans for the Arts, (AAFTA). Alexander is also a member of the American Photography Archives Group, (APAG) which is a 501(c)(3) non-profit resource organization for individuals who own or manage a privately held photography archive. Alexander belongs to the National Alliance of Artists from Historically Black Colleges and Universities (NAAHBU) which is an organization founded on May 19, 2000, on Morris Brown College campus in Atlanta, Georgia. The organization features artists that have taught, studied, or worked in art departments and programs at HBCUs.

== Selected shows and exhibits ==
- 2018: Live the Legacy Series Installation #1, The National Center for Civil and Human Rights, Atlanta, GA. Solo Show
- 2018: The Spiritual Beauty & Resilience in America, National Center for the Study of Civil Rights and African-American Culture, Montgomery, AL. Group Show
- 2017: The Spiritual Beauty & Resilience in America, Warren-Britt Gallery, Alabama State University, Montgomery, AL. Group Show
- 2017: Jim Alexander: Preserving the Legacy, Chace Upper Gallery, Emory University, Atlanta, GA. Solo Show
- 2017: Soulful Images by Jim Alexander, APEX Museum, Atlanta, GA. Solo Show
- 2017: The Atlanta Jazz Festival in Photographs, Arnika Dawkins Gallery, Atlanta, GA. Group Show
- 2017: Atlanta Jazz Festival: Forty Years, Chastain Art Gallery. Atlanta, GA. Group Show
- 2016: Jim Alexander: Participant Observer, Tubman African American Museum, Macon, GA. Solo Show
- 2015: On Being Black, Arnika Dawkins Gallery. Atlanta, GA. Group Show
- 2014: Romare at the NAC, Fulton County Arts and Culture Southwest Arts Center, Atlanta, GA. Solo Show
- 2014: Southern Connections: Bearden in Atlanta, Emory University's Michael C. Carlos Museum. Atlanta, GA. Invitational
- 2013: Congo Square to Symphony Hall, Lamar Dodd Art Center. Lagrange, GA. Solo Show
- 2012: The Quest for Black Citizenship in the Americas, Gallery of Art, Bowie State University, Bowie, MD. Group Show
- 2012: In the Tradition, Buckhead Library, Atlanta, GA. Solo Show
- 2011: Black Music After 1968: The Photography of Jim Alexander, Harvey B. Gantt Center, Charlotte, NC. Solo Show
- 2009: Blues Roots and Branches, Central Library Art Gallery, Atlanta, GA. Solo Show
- 2009: Faces in the Arts: Through the Lens of Jim Alexander, Southwest Arts Center Performance Theater and Gallery, Atlanta, GA. Solo Show
- 2009: Jazz Photography by Jim Alexander, Hayti Heritage Center, Durham, NC. Solo Show
- 2008: Classic Jazz: Photos by Jim Alexander, The Metro Toronto Convention Centre. Toronto, Ontario Canada. Solo Show
- 2008: Peace, Unity North Atlanta Church. Atlanta, GA. Solo Show
- 2008: The Masters Series Reunion, City Gallery East, Atlanta, GA. Group Show
- 2007: Spirits / Martyrs / Heroes, Broadway & LRC Galleries. Passaic County Community College, Paterson, NJ. Solo Show
- 2006: Jazz, Hartsfield-Jackson International Airport, Atlanta, GA. Solo Show
- 2005: A Century of African-American Art: Selections from The Paul R. Jones Collection, Museum of Fine Art, Spelman College, Atlanta, GA. Group Show
- 2005: Jim Alexander: Photographer, Hammond's House Galleries, Atlanta, GA. Solo Retrospective Show
- 2005: Return to the Source, Benjamin and Jeanette Cox Gallery, Avery Research Center. Charleston, SC. Solo Show
- 2004: Jim Alexander Photographs From the Darlene and Herbert Charles Collection, African-American Hall of Fame, Morehouse College. Atlanta, GA. Solo Show
- 2003: Enduring Legacy: Photographs by Jim Alexander, Schatten Gallery, Emory University. Atlanta, GA. Solo Show
- 2002: Jim Alexander: Photographer, Atlanta History Center. Atlanta, GA. Solo Show
- 2000: Still Here: Swinging, Jazz Photographs by Jim Alexander, NBAF 2000, Virginia Lacy Jones Exhibition Hall. Atlanta University Center, Atlanta, GA. Solo Show
- 1999: An All Ellington Evening, Birmingham Museum of Art. Birmingham, AL. Solo Show
- 1993 – 1996: Beyond Category: The Musical Genius of Duke Ellington, National Museum of American History. Washington, D. C. Three-Year National Tour, Invitational
- 1995: Jim Alexander: Telling Our Story, City Gallery East. Atlanta, GA. Inaugural Atlanta Masters Exhibit. Solo Show (Atlanta Olympics)
- 1990: Art is Jazz / Jazz is Art, Museum of African American Art. Los Angeles, CA. Invitational
- 1988 – 1989: Duke and Other Legends: Jazz Photographs by Jim Alexander, Exhibit Toured Museums and Galleries in Ten Southern States. Solo Show
- 1988: Blues Legacy, Apex Museum. Atlanta, GA. Solo Show
- 1986: Atlanta Artists, Lunds Kunsthall Sweden. Lund, Sweden. Group Show

== Collections ==
Works by Alexander are held in the following collections:

- Smithsonian Institution, Washington, DC
- Stuart A. Rose Manuscript, Archives, and Rare Book Library Emory University, Atlanta, GA
- Museum of Contemporary Art of Georgia (MOCA GA) Collection, Atlanta, GA
- Paul R. Jones Collections University of Alabama & University of Delaware
- Atlanta University Center Collection, Atlanta, GA
- Harvey B. Gantt Center Collection, Atlanta, GA
- Auburn Avenue Research Library, Atlanta, GA
- Yale University, New Haven, CT
- Hartsfield Jackson Atlanta International Airport Art Collection, Atlanta, GA
- Clark Atlanta University Collection, Atlanta, GA
- Maynard Jackson, Atlanta, GA
- Charleston Jazz Initiative Archives, Charleston, SC
- Hammonds House Museum, Atlanta, GA
- City of Atlanta Art Collection, Atlanta, GA
- Fulton County Arts Collection, Atlanta, GA
- Bunnie Jackson-Ransom, Atlanta, GA
- Calvin W. McLarin, MD, Atlanta, GA
- Clark Atlanta University Collection, Atlanta, GA
- Maynard Jackson, Atlanta, GA
- Metro Atlanta Cardiology Consultants, Atlanta, GA
- Southwest Dialysis Clinic, Atlanta, GA
- William Cleveland, MD, Atlanta, GA
