= Tourism in Atlanta =

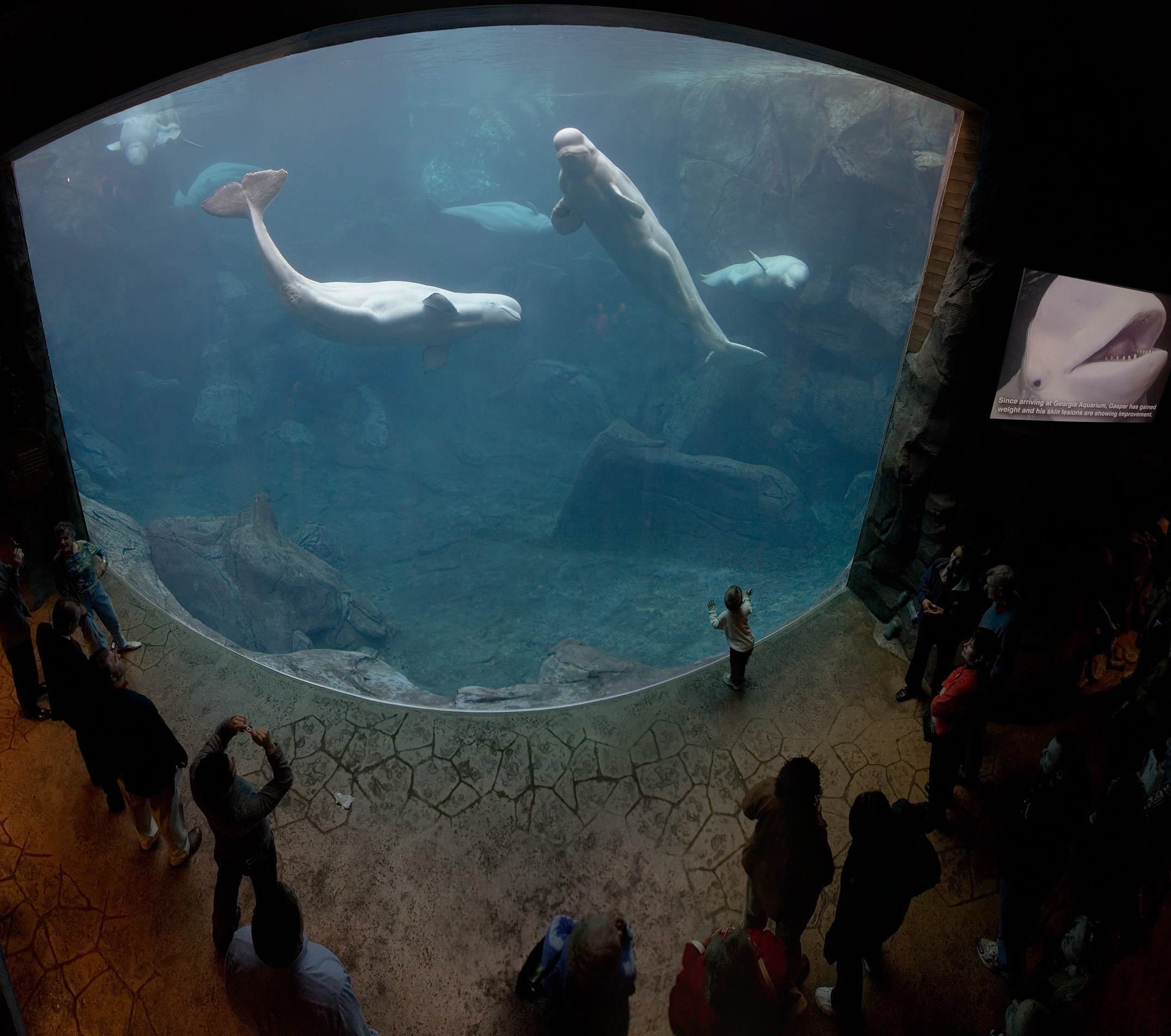
Beluga Whales at the Georgia Aquarium

As of 2010, Atlanta is the seventh-most visited city in the United States, with over 35 million visitors per year. The city was the 12th most popular destination for overseas visitors, who numbered 712,000 in total (2010).

Atlanta's premier tourist attraction is the world's largest aquarium, the Georgia Aquarium, located a 20-acre (81,000 m^{2}) site at Pemberton Place that is also home to the World of Coca-Cola and within walking distance of Centennial Olympic Park, Mercedes-Benz Stadium, State Farm Arena, the CNN Center and other downtown Atlanta tourist attractions.

The Jackson Street Bridge in Old Fourth Ward is one of Atlanta's most iconic landmarks and a highly popular photo destination for tourists due to the city's downtown skyline and major highways in the background.

Atlanta also attracts visitors with its performing arts venues, museums and historical sites, parks, cuisine, and its many festivals and events.

== Sites of interest to tourists ==
- Atlanta BeltLine
- Atlanta Botanical Garden
- Atlanta Civic Center
- Atlanta Contemporary Art Center
- Atlanta Cyclorama & Civil War Museum
- Atlanta History Center
- Atlanta Monetary Museum
- APEX Museum
- CNN Center
- Cellairis Amphitheatre
- Callanwolde Center for Fine Arts
- Carter Center
- Centennial Olympic Park
- Center for Puppetry Arts
- Chastain Park Amphitheater
- Children's Museum of Atlanta
- College Football Hall of Fame
- Delta Flight Museum
- Fernbank Forest
- Fernbank Museum of Natural History
- Fernbank Science Center
- Fox Theatre
- Georgia Aquarium
- Georgia World Congress Center
- Grant Park
- Herndon Home
- High Museum of Art
- LEGOLAND Discovery Center Atlanta
- Lenox Square
- Kennesaw Mountain
- Margaret Mitchell House
- Martin Luther King, Jr. National Historic Site
- Mary Mac's Tea Room
- Mercedes-Benz Stadium
- Michael C. Carlos Museum
- Millennium Gate
- Museum of Contemporary Art of Georgia
- Museum of Design Atlanta
- National Center for Civil and Human Rights
- National Museum of Patriotism
- Oakland Cemetery
- Phipps Plaza
- Plaza Theatre
- Piedmont Park
- Robert C. Williams Museum of Papermaking
- Six Flags Over Georgia
- Six Flags White Water
- Southeastern Railway Museum
- State Farm Arena
- Stone Mountain Park
- Sweet Auburn Curb Market
- The Varsity
- Underground Atlanta
- William Breman Jewish Heritage & Holocaust Museum
- Woodruff Arts Center
- World of Coca-Cola
- Zoo Atlanta

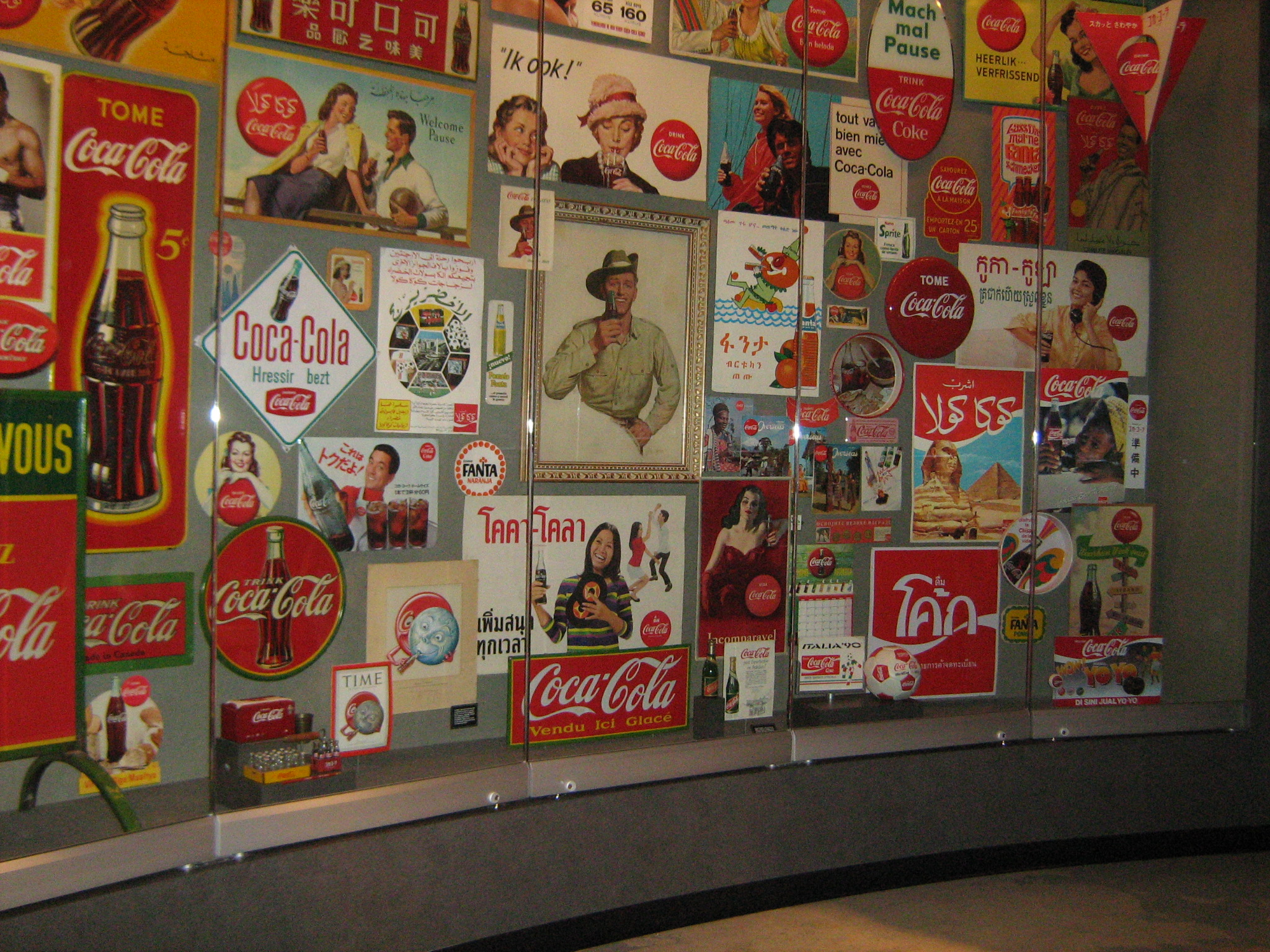
Exhibit at the World of Coca-Cola

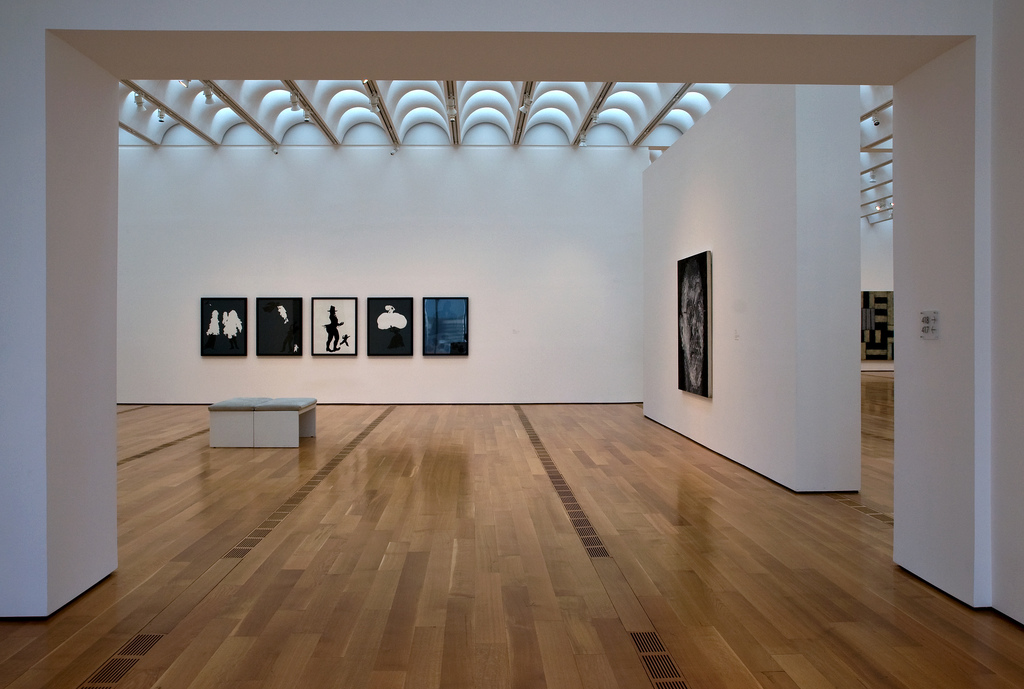
Artwork at the High Museum

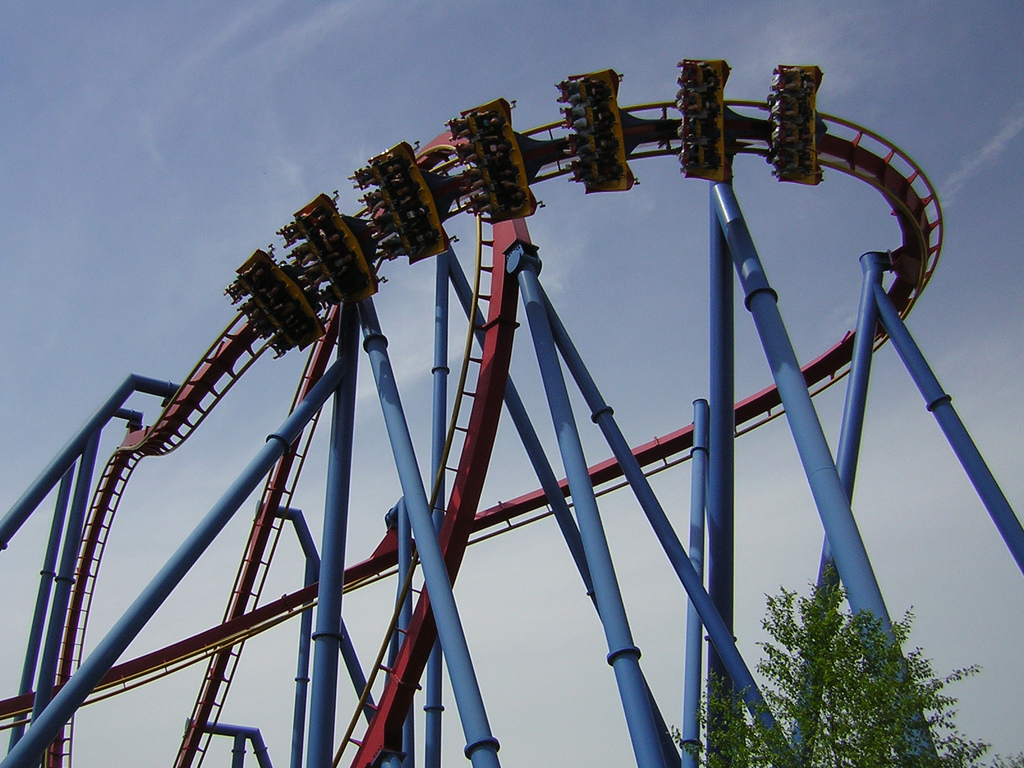
Superman, a roller coaster at Six Flags Over Georgia
