= Atlanta Botanical Garden =

Botanic garden in Atlanta, Georgia, US

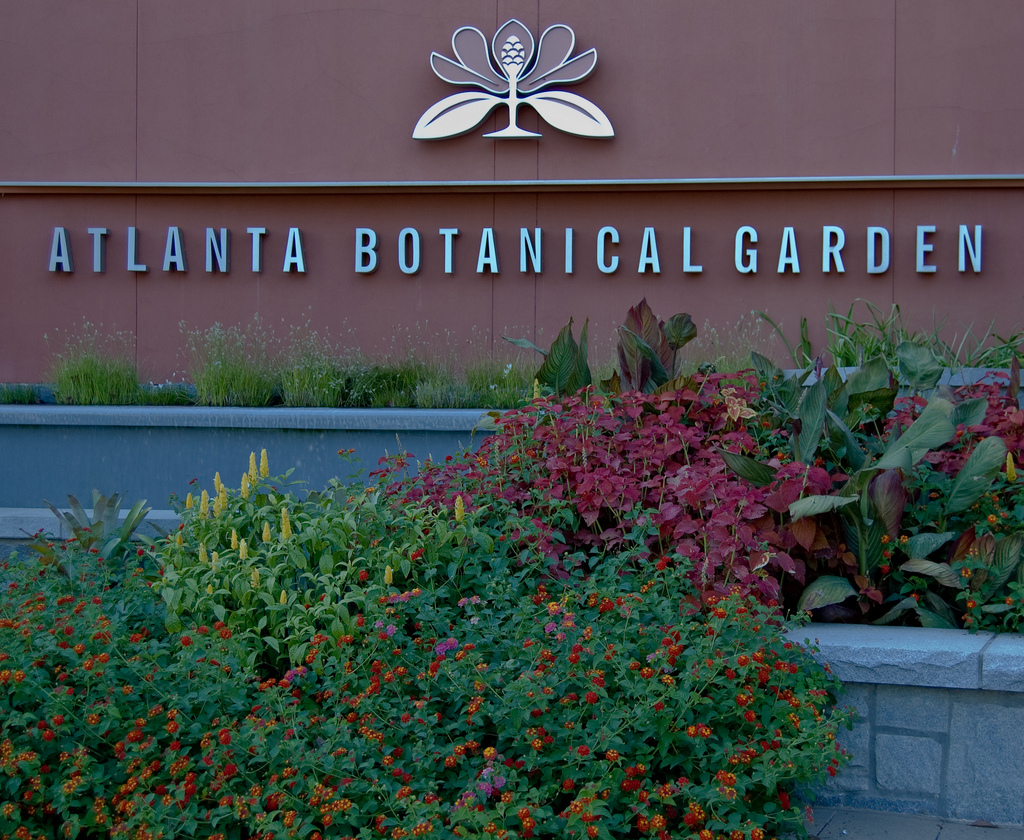
- Interactive map of Atlanta Botanical Garden
- Location: Atlanta, Georgia
- Coordinates: 33°47′24″N 84°22′26″W
- Created: 1976
- Website: atlantabg.org

The Atlanta Botanical Garden is a 30 acres (12 ha) botanical garden located adjacent to Piedmont Park in Midtown Atlanta, Georgia, United States. Incorporated in 1976, the garden's mission is to "develop and maintain plant collections for the purposes of display, education, conservation, research and enjoyment."

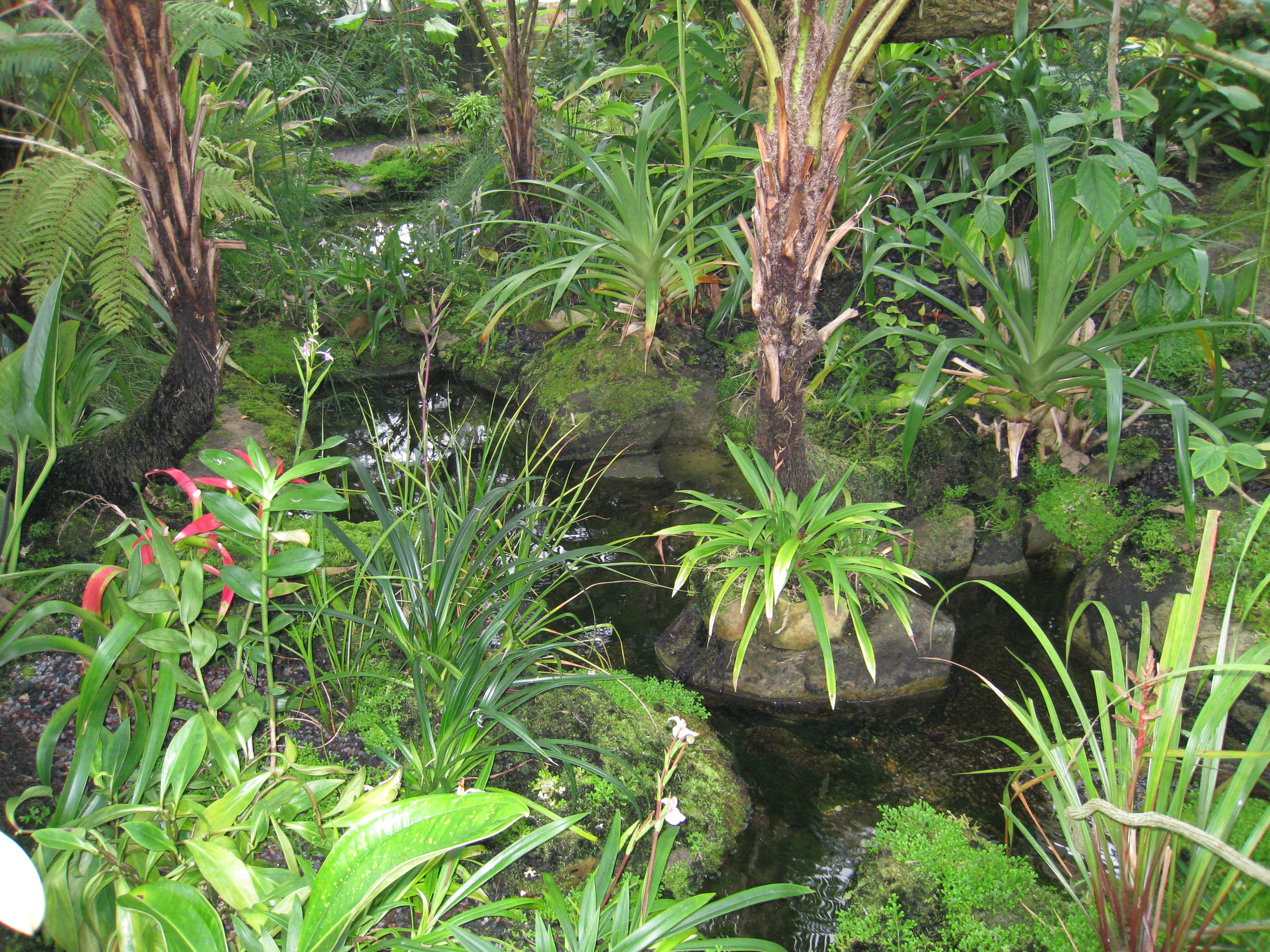
Indoor view

== History ==
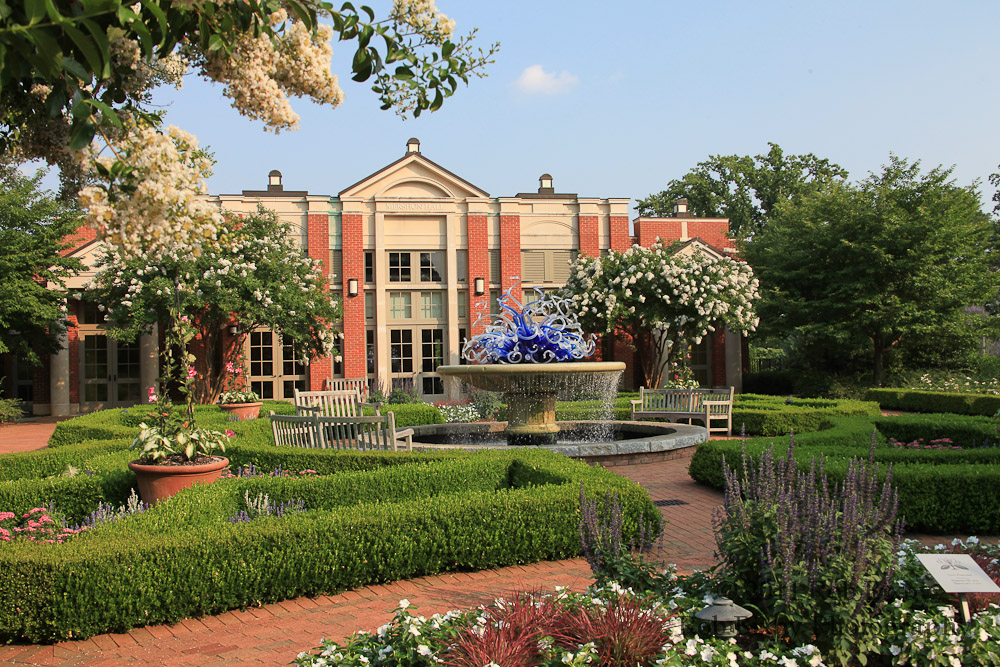
Atlanta Botanical Garden welcome center

Following a petition by citizens of Atlanta in 1973, the garden was incorporated in 1976, as the private, 501(c)(3) non-profit corporation Atlanta Botanical Garden Inc.. The garden incorporated the pre-existing Dr. A. Leslie Stephens Memorial Bonsai Garden, now known as the Japanese Garden. Within a year Bill Warner, previously employed at Holden Arboretum, was assigned office as the first executive director. He was soon followed by Ann L. Crammond in 1979. The following year marked a turning point in the history of the garden as a 50-year lease was negotiated with the city, securing the site of the Garden for years to come.

A number of promotional activities started taking place, including social events, major art exhibitions and the annual Garden of Eden Ball. The Atlanta Botanical Garden welcomed its 50,000th visitor within a mere three years after the lease was arranged—this was even before any permanent structures had been erected. In 1985, the Atlanta Botanical Garden built its first permanent structure, the Gardenhouse. Expansions following this were The Children's Garden (1999), the Fuqua Conservatory in 1989, and the Fuqua Orchid Center which was added in 2002.

Blockbuster summertime exhibitions began in 2003 with TREEmendous TREEhouses. Chihuly in the Garden opened in 2004, while in 2005 Locomotion in the Garden featured G-scale model trains. On April 29, 2006, an exhibition of the sculpture of Niki de Saint Phalle opened to the public. These huge mosaic sculptures came to the Garden from France, Germany, and California. In 2007, the exhibition was David Rogers' Big Bugs and Killer Plants, and 2008 is Sculpture in Motion, Art Choreographed by Nature, a display of moving, kinetic art. In 2009, the Garden hosted an exhibition of the monumental bronze sculptures of Henry Moore. The summers of 2010 and 2011 showcased the Garden's green expansion (see below), and in 2012, the Garden hosted Independent Visions, an exhibition of contemporary sculptures by nine artists. In 2013, the Garden will unveil Imaginary Worlds: Plants Larger than Life, made up of 19 mosaic culture sculptures. In 2016, Chihuly in the Garden open again with 19 installations throughout the Garden.

In the winter the Garden has a holiday light show. "Garden Lights, Holiday Nights" began in 2011 featuring displays created with more than 1 million lights, most of them LED. The following year, the show grew to more than 1.5 million lights and attracted more than 160,000 visitors.

== Chihuly in the Garden Exhibition ==
In 2004, the Atlanta Botanical Garden hosted an exhibition of glass art by Dale Chihuly titled "Chihuly in the Garden". The exhibit ran through the end of October and was extended until December 31, 2004. During the eight-month run, an estimated 425,000 attendees visited the exhibit. The peak per-day rates of 7,500 were double the previous single-day attendance record at the Garden. Chihuly in the Garden returned to the Atlanta location on April 30, 2016, with 19 new installations.

== Green Expansion Plan ==
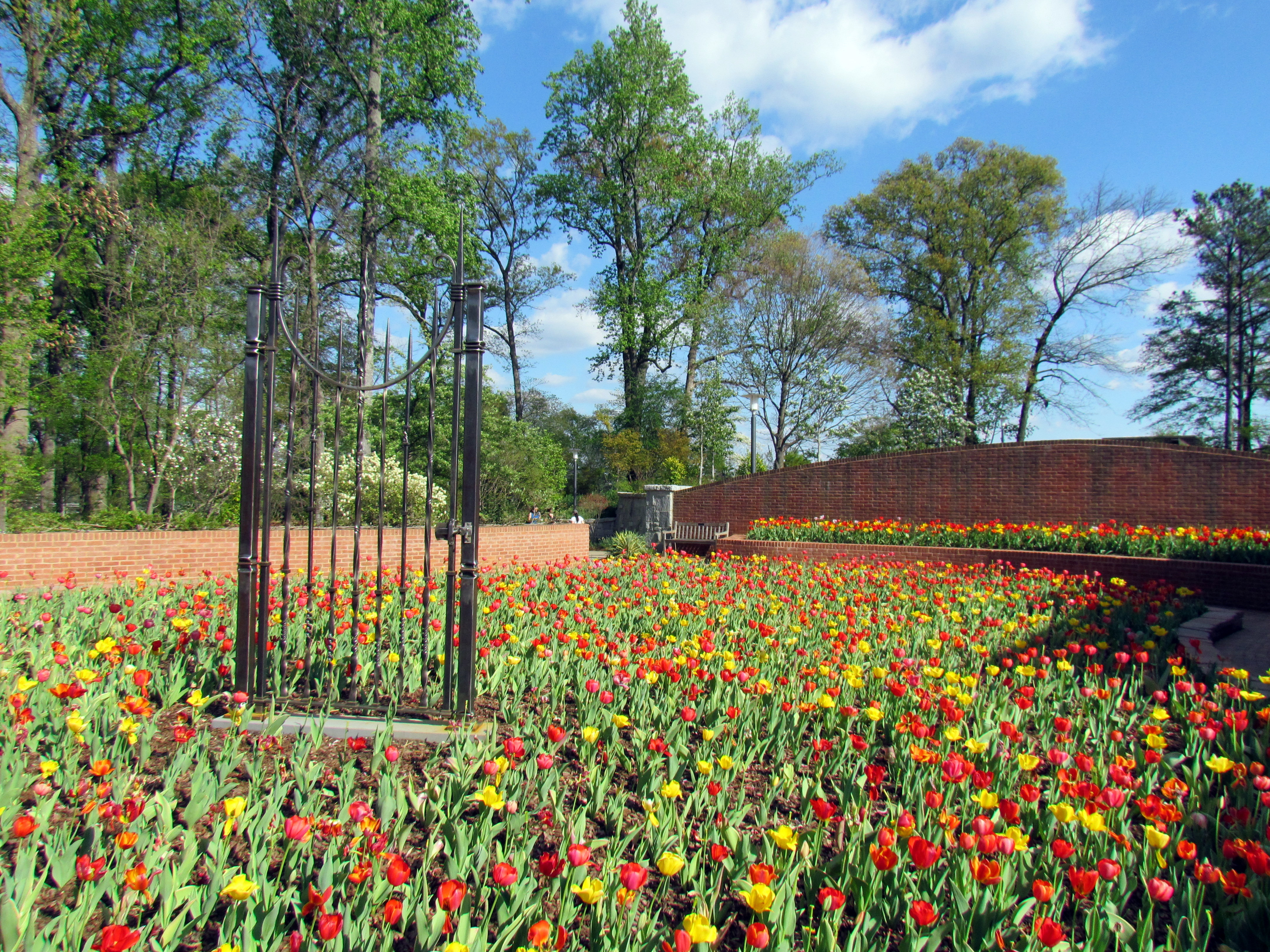
Flowers

The Green Expansion Plan was a large-scale expansion project that was completed in the spring of 2010 that doubled the size of the Garden while modernizing them at the same time. The expansion plan encompassed the construction of a number of new facilities, the most noticeable of which are the new visitor center and 600-foot-long (180 m) canopy walk.

The plan was built around five key areas of human and environmental health: sustainable site development, water savings, energy efficiency, materials selection and indoor environmental quality. By employing an array of energy-saving strategies with environmental sustainability considered throughout the project and recycling any trees removed as a result of construction, considerable efforts were made to make this expansion eco-friendly. A 100,000-gallon cistern was installed underground in December 2007 to aid in water conservation; the cistern fills with only an inch and a quarter of rain and waters about 40% of the new gardens.

== Canopy Walk ==
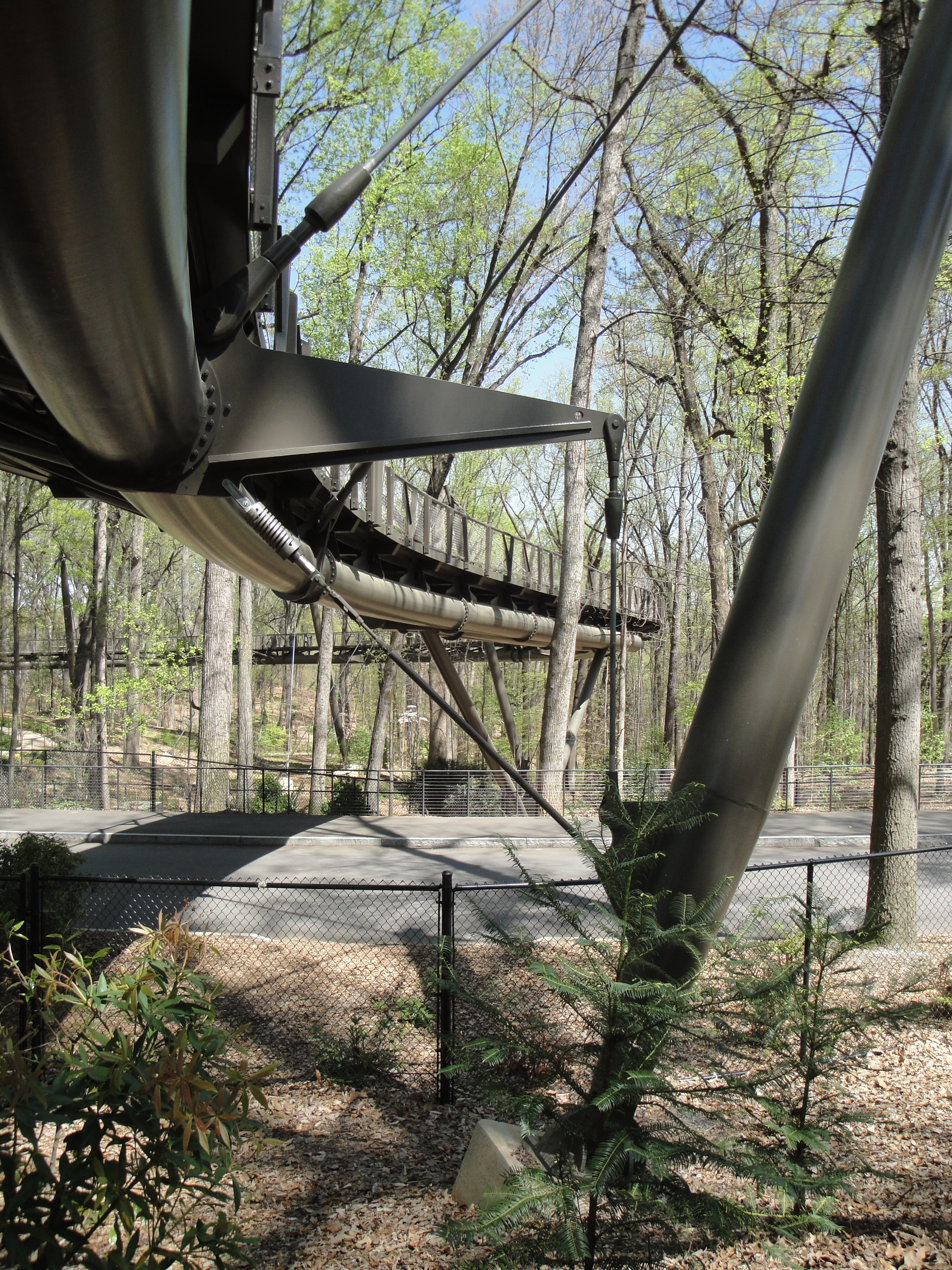
Canopy Walk

The Atlanta Botanical Garden is home to the Kendeda Canopy Walk, a 600-foot-long (180 m) skywalk that allows the visitors to tour one of the city's last remaining urban forests from around 40 feet in the air through the treetops of the Storza Woods. The skywalk extends from a bluff in the Garden into the branches of oaks, hickories and poplars. The structure also provides an aerial view of the woodland garden below.

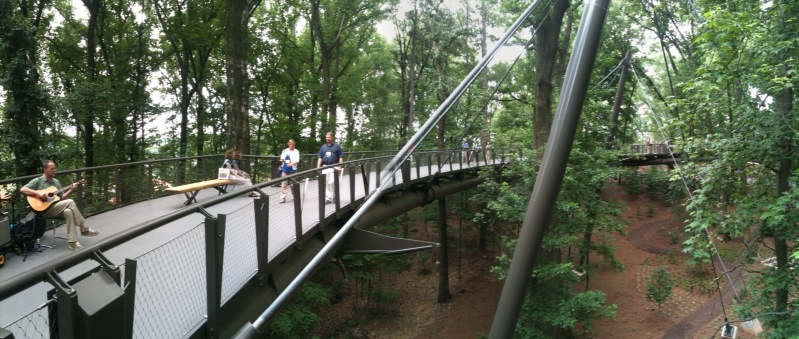
Atlanta Botanical Garden canopy walk

The Canopy Walk was built for $55 million and opened in 2010. It was originally set to open in 2009, but during its construction in 2008, the skywalk collapsed, killing one worker and injuring 18 others. Because of the uniqueness of the Canopy Walk, city leaders believe it will become an icon for Atlanta.

== Exhibits ==
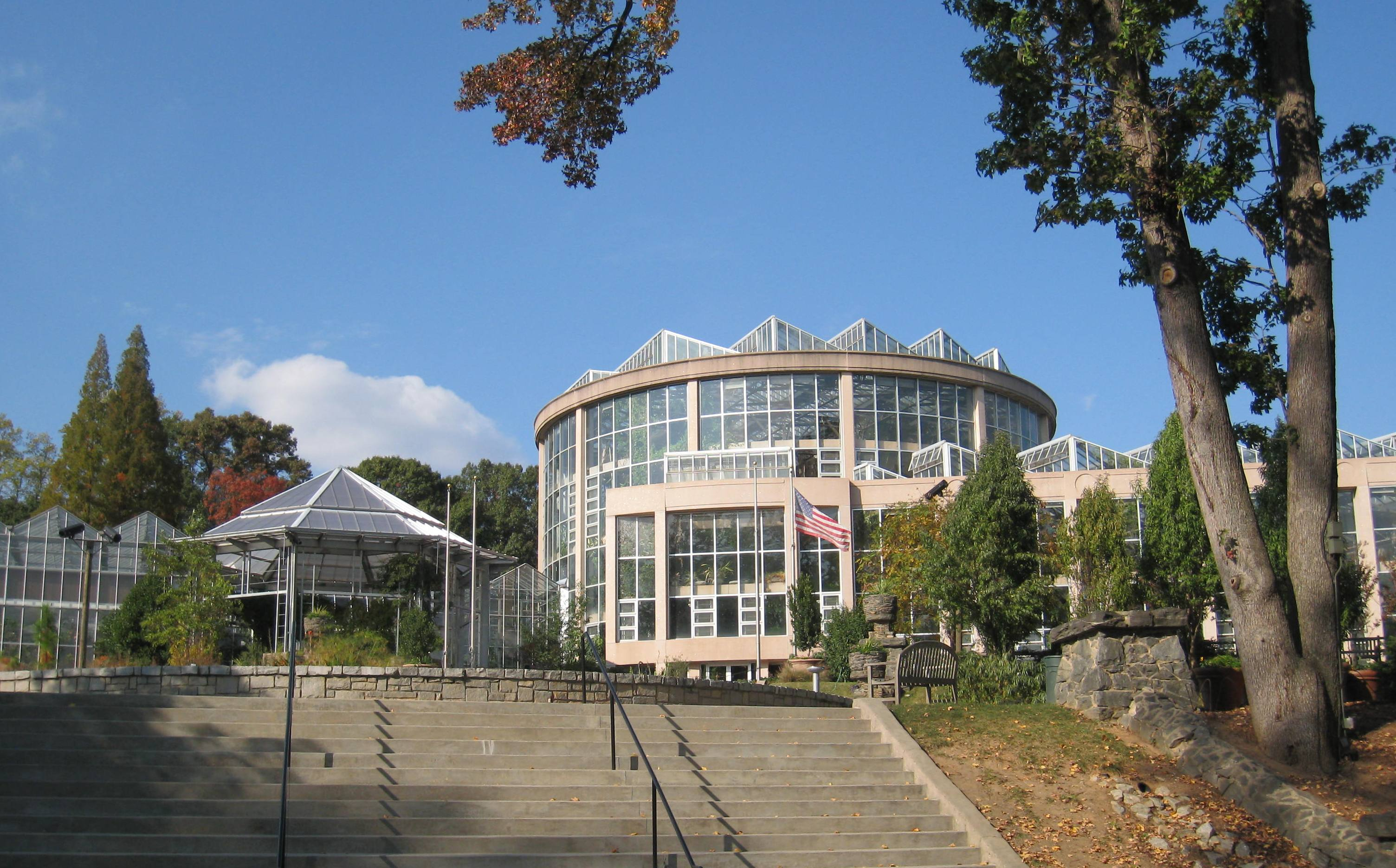
The Dorothy Chapman Fuqua Conservatory

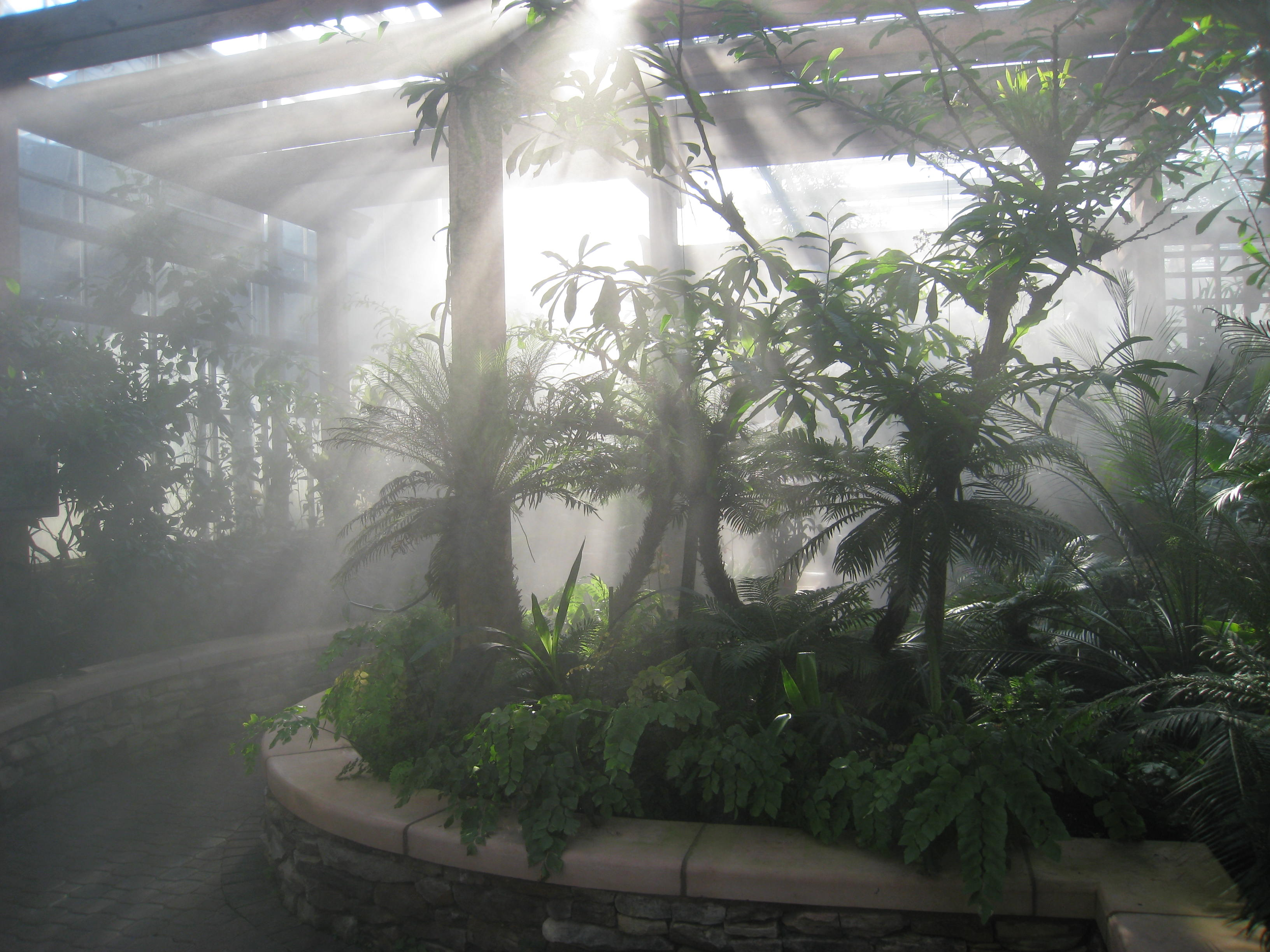
Orchid house

The Botanical Garden is composed of a number of smaller themed gardens. Each contains different landscapes to display a variety of plants. Near the entrance are formal gardens, such as the Japanese garden and the rose garden. Two woodland areas, the 5 acres (20,000 m^{2}) Upper Woodland and the 10 acres (40,000 m^{2}) Storza Woods feature large trees and shade-loving flowers and undergrowth. The Children's Garden features whimsical sculptures, fountains, and interpretive exhibits on botany, ecology, and nutrition.

The 16,000 square feet (1,500 m^{2}) Dorothy Chapman Fuqua Conservatory contains indoor exhibits of plants from tropical rainforests and deserts. The rain forest room of the Fuqua Conservatory is also populated by tropical birds, turtles, and several exhibits of poison dart frogs, the last of which is a collaboration in conservation efforts with Zoo Atlanta. Adjoining this building, the Fuqua Orchid Center contains separate rooms simulating the tropics and high elevations in order to house rare orchids from around the world.

The Fuqua Orchid Center is home to the largest collection of species orchids on permanent display in the U.S. and hosts a wintertime display known as Orchid Daze. Its unique Tropical High Elevation House provides the correct habitat for montane orchids and companion plants from around the equator at elevations of 6,000 to 10,000 feet. An Air Washer System, technology adapted from the textile industry, was combined with traditional greenhouse heating and cooling to create this environment and allows rare orchids to thrive. The Tropical Display House is filled with fragrant orchids from around the world.

The Earth Goddess is a 25-foot sculpture that is a centerpiece of the Cascades Garden. It was the highlight of the "Imaginary Worlds" exhibition that was showcased in 2013–2014. It has since become a permanent part of the Cascades Garden.

== See also ==
- List of botanical gardens in the United States
- Tourism in Atlanta
