= Mary Mac's Tea Room =

Restaurant in Atlanta, Georgia, U.S.

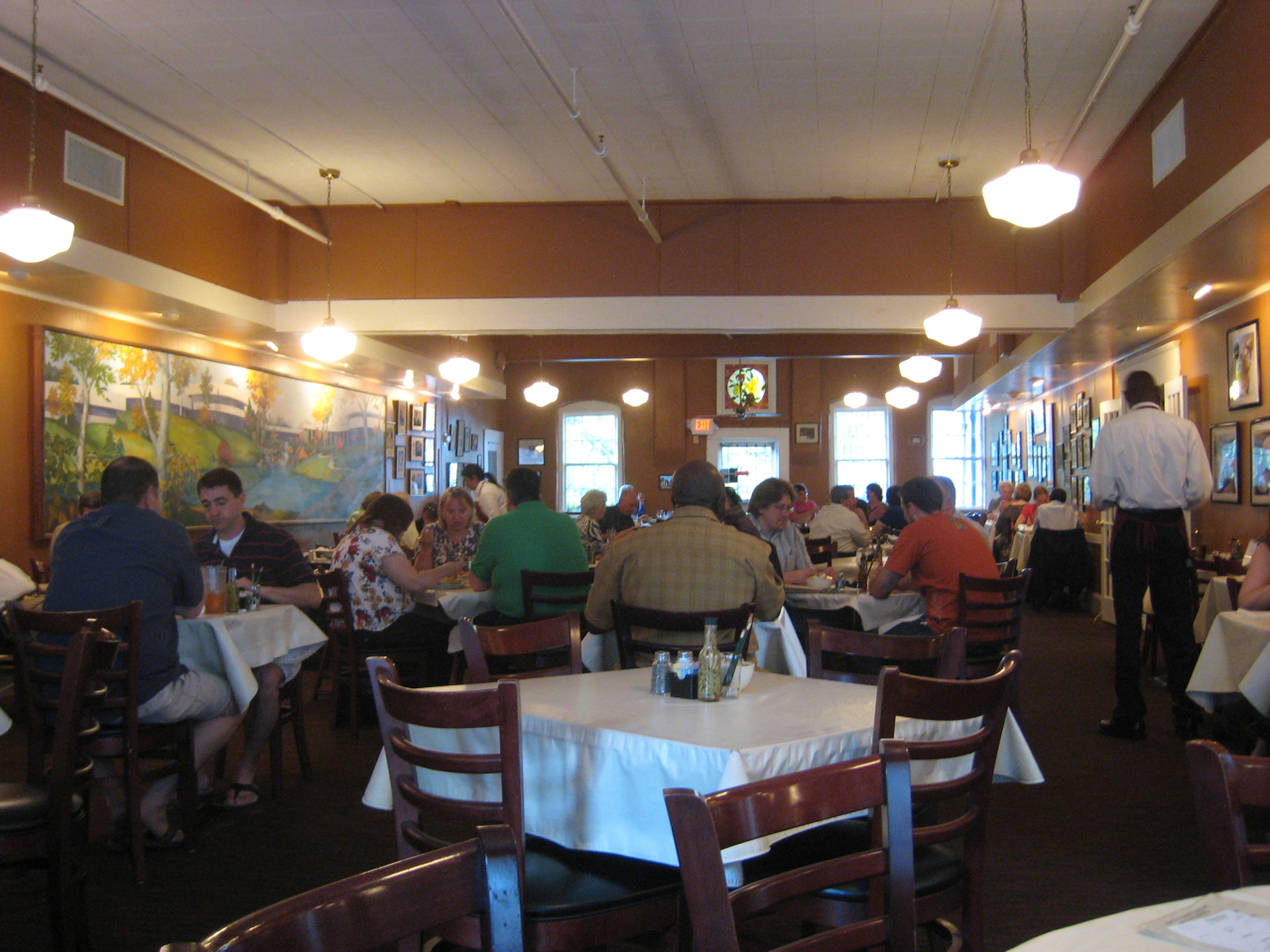
- Interior of Mary Mac's Tea Room in 2010.

- Location in Atlanta Location in Georgia Location in the US

Restaurant information
- Established: 1945
- Owner: Harold Martin Jr.
- Location: 224 Ponce de Leon Avenue NE, Atlanta, Fulton, Georgia, United States
- Coordinates: 33.772907°N 84.379996°W
- Website: marymacs.com

Mary Mac's Tea Room is a restaurant in Atlanta, Georgia, serving Southern cuisine. The restaurant is located in the Midtown district at 224 Ponce de Leon Avenue NE. The current owner is Harold Martin Jr.

== History ==
Mary MacKenzie opened the restaurant in 1945. Just after World War II, enterprising women in search of a living, many of them widowed by the war, were establishing restaurants throughout Atlanta. Calling their establishments "tea rooms" was a polite way of elevating their endeavor. In 1945, Mary Mac's was one of 16 tea rooms in the city, and as of today it is the only one that remains. In 1962, Mary Mac's became one of Atlanta's first integrated restaurants in the midst of the Civil Rights Movement.

The restaurant is known for continuing the cooking traditions of MacKenzie and her successor, Margaret Lupo, who owned the Tea Room from 1962 until 1994. It has hosted many famous visitors, including Dalai Lama, John Lewis, James Brown, Beyonce, Hillary Clinton, Alan Jackson, and Jimmy Carter, who ate at Mary Mac's so frequently he had a dessert named after him: Carter Custard.

On March 6, 2024, the roof of Mary Mac's suddenly collapsed following storms and heavy rains. No one was injured in the collapse. The restaurant re-opened in May following extensive and ongoing repairs.

== Cuisine ==
Mary Mac's serves classic Southern cuisine.

== See also ==
- Culture of Atlanta
- List of Southern restaurants
- Tourism in Atlanta
