= Bessye J. Bearden =

American journalist and civic activist

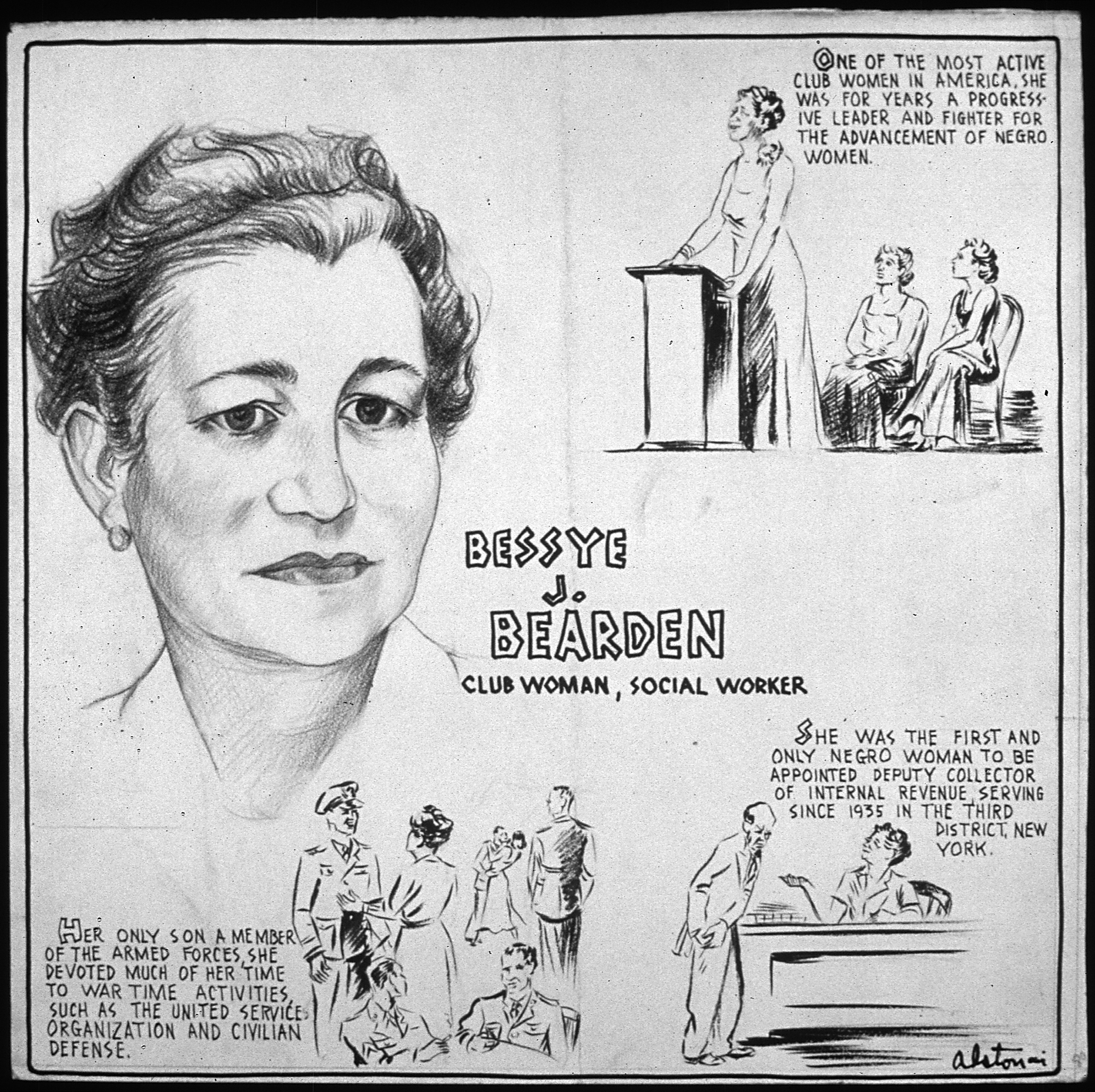
- Born: Bessye Banks; November 1893; Atlantic City, New Jersey, U.S.
- Died: September 16, 1943 (aged 49); Harlem, New York, U.S.
- Education: Virginia Normal and Industrial Institute
- Occupation: Journalist
- Spouse: Richard Howard Bearden

Bessye Johnson Bearden (November 1893 – September 16, 1943) was an American journalist and civic activist, who was the mother of artist Romare Bearden.

== Biography ==
Born in Atlantic City, New Jersey, as Bessye Banks, youngest child of George T. and Carrie O. Banks, she attended schools in North Carolina, Hartshorn Memorial College in Richmond, Virginia, and Virginia Normal and Industrial Institute (now Virginia State University), from which she graduated. She subsequently did graduate work at the Western University of Pennsylvania (now the University of Pittsburgh) and Columbia University.

At the age of 20 she married Richard Howard Bearden, with whom she had one son, Romare, born in Charlotte, North Carolina. The family moved to New York City in 1914, settling in 1920 in Harlem, where their home was a meeting place for intellectuals and artists, including such musicians as Duke Ellington and Thomas "Fats" Waller. Calvin Tomkins in The Jazz Cadence of American Culture describes Bessye J. as "a political force in Harlem...someone you came to when you wanted to cut through red tape and get action."

For several years from 1927 she served as a New York correspondent for the Chicago Defender, as well as doing freelance writing for other publications. She was the first woman to become a member of a local New York City school board, being elected in 1922 to local School Board No. 15, where she served until 1939.

She was also involved in a variety of civic activities and belonged to several organizations, including the New York Urban League, where she was secretary of the executive board, the Council of Negro Women, where she served as treasurer, and the executive boards of the Harlem Community Council and the Colored Women's Democratic League, of which she was the first president. On June 11, 1935, she was appointed Deputy Collector of Internal Revenue for the State of New York.

She died in Harlem Hospital, aged 49, and is buried at Woodlawn Cemetery.
