= Romare Bearden =

American artist, author, and songwriter (1911–1988)

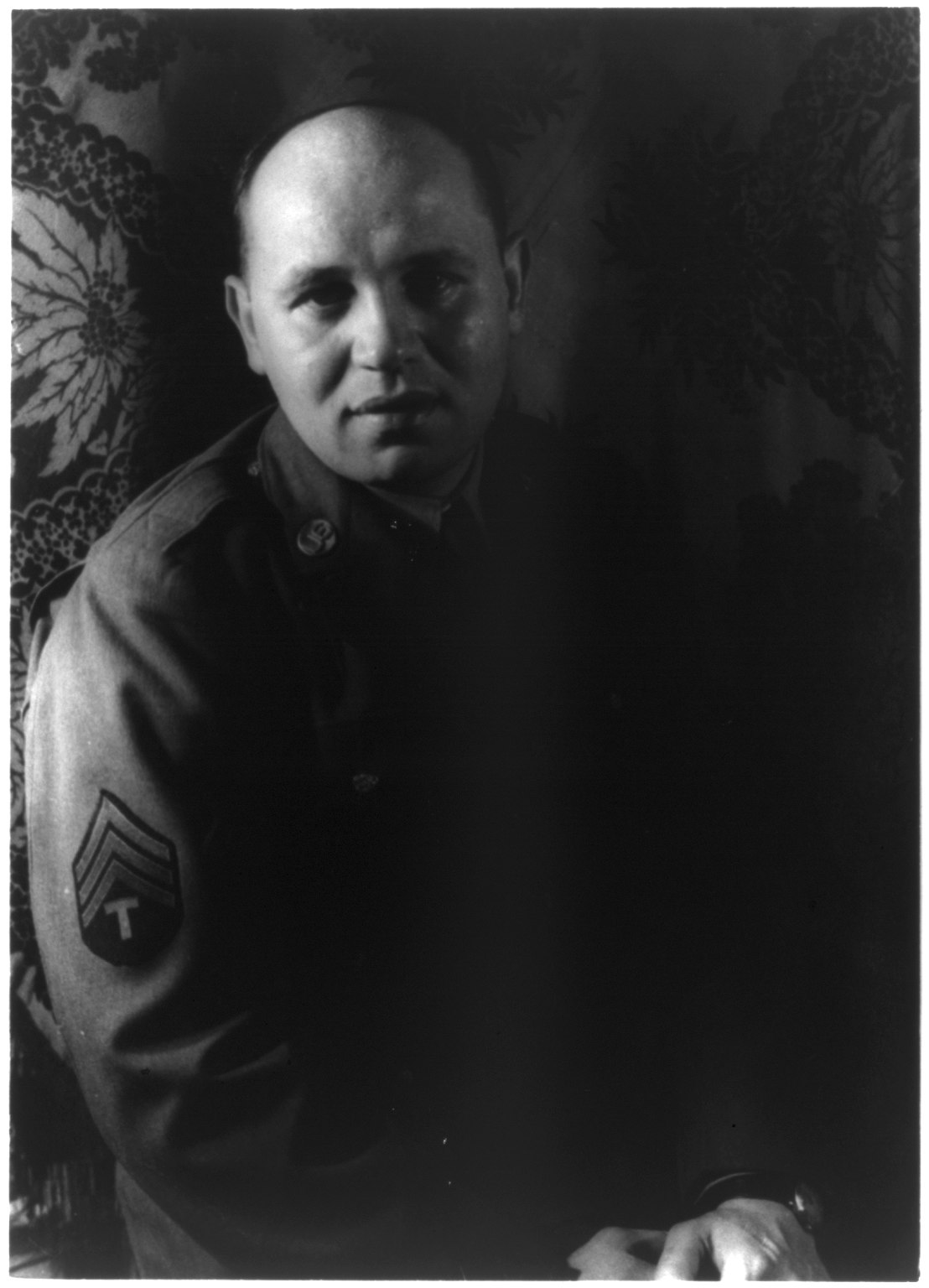
- Bearden in an army uniform, photographed by Carl Van Vechten, 1944
- Born: Romare Howard Bearden; September 2, 1911; Charlotte, North Carolina, U.S.
- Died: March 12, 1988 (aged 76); New York City, U.S.
- Education: New York University
- Occupations: Artist, author, and songwriter
- Known for: Painting
- Movement: Spiral, collective of African-American artists
- Spouse: Nanette Bearden (m. 1954)
- Awards: National Medal of Arts

Romare Howard Bearden (/ˈroʊməriː/, ROH-mə-ree) (September 2, 1911 – March 12, 1988) was an American artist, author, and songwriter. He worked with many types of media including cartoons, oils, and collages. Born in Charlotte, North Carolina, Bearden grew up in New York City and Pittsburgh, Pennsylvania, and graduated from New York University in 1935.

He began his artistic career creating scenes of the American South. Later, he worked to express the humanity he felt was lacking in the world after his experience in the US Army during World War II on the European front. He returned to Paris in 1950 and studied art history and philosophy at the Sorbonne.

Bearden's early work focused on unity and cooperation within the African-American community. After a period during the 1950s when he painted more abstractly, the theme re-emerged in his collage works of the 1960s. The New York Times described Bearden as "the nation's foremost collagist" in his 1988 obituary. Bearden became a founding member of the Harlem-based art group known as Spiral, formed to discuss the responsibility of the African-American artist in the civil rights movement.

Bearden was the author or coauthor of several books. He also was a songwriter, known as co-writer of the jazz classic "Sea Breeze", which was recorded by Billy Eckstine, a former high school classmate at Peabody High School, and Dizzy Gillespie. Bearden had long supported young, emerging artists and he and his wife established the Bearden Foundation to continue this work, as well as to support young scholars. In 1987, Bearden was awarded the National Medal of Arts.

== Early life and education ==
Bearden was born September 2, 1911, in Charlotte. Bearden and his family moved to New York City when he was a toddler, as part of the Great Migration. After enrolling in P.S. 5 in 1917, on 141 Street and Edgecombe Avenue in Harlem, he attended P.S. 139 and then DeWitt Clinton High School. In 1927 he moved to East Liberty, Pittsburgh with his grandparents and then returned to New York City. The Bearden household soon became a meeting place for major figures of the Harlem Renaissance. His father, R. Howard Bearden, was a grocer and pianist. Romare's mother, Bessye Bearden née Banks, played an active role with the New York City Board of Education, and also was the founder and president of the Colored Women's Democratic League. She was a New York correspondent for The Chicago Defender, an African-American newspaper. Romare had Cherokee, Italian, and African ancestry. The Washington Post described him as "African American". His fair skin allowed him to cross boundaries which many other Black people were unable to access.

In 1929, Romare Bearden graduated from Peabody High School in Pittsburgh. He enrolled in Lincoln University, the nation's second oldest historically Black college, founded in 1854. He transferred to Boston University where he served as the art director for Beanpot, Boston University's student humor magazine. He continued his studies at New York University (NYU), where he started to focus more on his art and less on athletics, and became a lead cartoonist and art editor for The Medley, the monthly journal of the secretive Eucleian Society at NYU. Bearden studied art, education, science, and mathematics graduating with a degree in science and education in 1935.

Bearden continued his artistic study under German artist George Grosz at the Art Students League in 1936 and 1937. During this time he supported himself by working as a political cartoonist for African-American newspapers, including the Baltimore Afro-American, where he published a weekly cartoon from 1935 until 1937.

== Semi-professional baseball career ==
As a child, Bearden played baseball in empty lots in his neighborhood. He enjoyed sports, throwing discus for his high school track team and trying out for football. After his mother became the New York editor for the Chicago Defender, he did some writing for the paper, including some stories about baseball. But once Bearden transferred from Lincoln University to Boston University, he became the starting fullback for the school football team (1931-2) and then began pitching - first for the freshman team and eventually for the school's varsity baseball team. He was awarded a certificate of merit for his pitching at BU, which he hung with pride in subsequent homes throughout his life.

While at Boston University he played for the Boston Tigers, a semi-professional, all Black team based in the neighborhood of Roxbury. He tended to play with them during the BU baseball off-season and had opportunities to play both iconic Negro League and white baseball teams. For example, he pitched against Satchel Paige while playing for the Pittsburgh Crawfords for a summer, and played exhibition games against teams such as the House of David and the Kansas City Monarchs. When Philadelphia Athletics catcher, Mickey Cochrane, brought a number of teammates to play a game against BU, Bearden gave up only one hit—impressing Athletics owner Connie Mack. Mack offered Bearden a place on the Athletics fifteen years before Jackie Robinson became the first Black player in major league baseball. There are conflicting sources as to whether Mack thought Bearden was white or told Bearden he would have to pass for white. Despite the Athletics winning the World Series in 1929 and 1930, and the American League pennant in 1931, Bearden decided he did not want to hide his identity and chose not to play for the Athletics. After two summers with the Boston Tigers, an injury made him rethink the attention he was giving to baseball and he put greater focus into his art, instead.

== Career as an artist ==
Patchwork Quilt, cut-and-pasted cloth and paper with synthetic polymer paint on composition board, 1970, Museum of Modern Art

Bearden grew as an artist by exploring his life experiences. His early paintings were often of scenes in the American South, and his style was strongly influenced by the Mexican muralists, especially Diego Rivera and José Clemente Orozco. In 1935, Bearden became a case worker for the Harlem office of the New York City Department of Social Services. Throughout his career as an artist, Bearden worked as a case worker off and on to supplement his income. During World War II, Bearden joined the United States Army, serving from 1942 until 1945, largely in Europe.

After serving in the army, Bearden joined the Samuel Kootz Gallery, a commercial gallery in New York that featured avant-garde art. He produced paintings at this time in "an expressionistic, linear, semi-abstract style." He returned to Europe in 1950 to study philosophy with Gaston Bachelard and art history at the Sorbonne, under the auspices of the G.I. Bill. Bearden traveled throughout Europe, visiting Picasso and other artists.

Making major changes in his art, he started producing abstract representations of what he deemed as human, specifically scenes from the Passion of Jesus. He had evolved from what Edward Alden Jewell, a reviewer for the New York Times, called a "debilitating focus on Regionalist and ethnic concerns" to what became known as his stylistic approach, which participated in the post-war aims of avant-garde American art. His works were exhibited at the Samuel M. Kootz gallery until it was deemed not abstract enough.

During Bearden's success in the gallery, however, he produced Golgotha, a painting from his series of the Passion of Jesus (see Figure 1). Golgotha is an abstract representation of the Crucifixion. The eye of the viewer is drawn to the middle of the image first, where Bearden has rendered Christ's body. The body parts are stylized into abstract geometric shapes, yet are still too realistic to be concretely abstract; this work has a feel of early Cubism. The body is in a central position and darkly contrasted with the highlighted crowds. The crowds of people are on the left and right, and are encapsulated within large spheres of bright colors of purple and indigo. The background of the painting is depicted in lighter jewel tones dissected with linear black ink. Bearden used these colors and contrasts because of the abstract influence of the time, but also for their meanings.

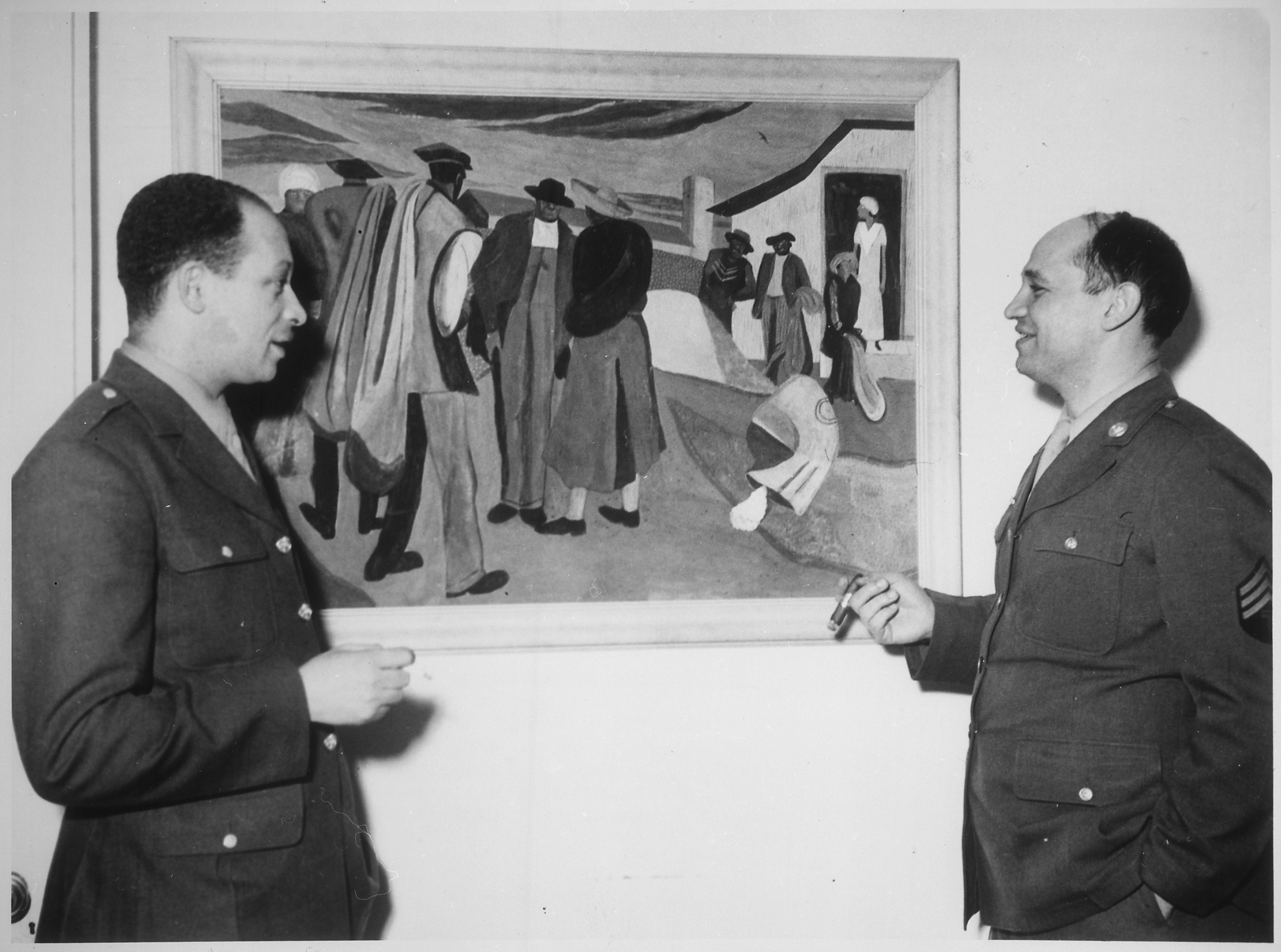
Bearden (right) discussing his painting Cotton Workers with Pvt. Charles H. Alston, his first art teacher and cousin, in 1944. Both Bearden and Alston were members of the 372nd Infantry Regiment stationed in New York City.

Bearden wanted to explore the emotions and actions of the crowds gathered around the Crucifixion. He worked hard to "depict myths in an attempt to convey universal human values and reactions." According to Bearden, Christ's life, death, and resurrection are the greatest expressions of man's humanism, because of the idea of him that lived on through other men. It is why Bearden focuses on Christ's body first, to portray the idea of the myth, and then highlights the crowd, to show how the idea is passed on to men.

Bearden was focusing on the spiritual intent. He wanted to show ideas of humanism and thought that cannot be seen by the eye, but "must be digested by the mind". This is in accordance with his times, during which other noted artists created abstract representations of historically significant events, such as Robert Motherwell's commemoration of the Spanish Civil War, Jackson Pollock's investigation of Northwest Coast Indian art, Mark Rothko's and Barnett Newman's interpretations of Biblical stories, etc. Bearden depicted humanity through abstract expressionism after feeling he did not see it during the war. Bearden's work was less abstract than these other artists, and Sam Kootz's gallery ended its representation of him.

Bearden turned to music, co-writing the hit song "Sea Breeze", which was recorded by Billy Eckstine and Dizzy Gillespie. It is still considered a jazz classic.

The Black American in Search of His Identity (1969) at the National Gallery of Art's showing of Afro-Atlantic Histories in Washington, DC in 2022

In the late 1950s, Bearden's work became more abstract. He used layers of oil paint to produce muted, hidden effects. In 1956, Bearden began studying with a Chinese calligrapher, whom he credits with introducing him to new ideas about space and composition which he used in painting. He also spent much time studying famous European paintings he admired, particularly the work of the Dutch artists Johannes Vermeer, Pieter de Hooch, and Rembrandt. He began exhibiting again in 1960. About this time he and his wife established a second home on the Caribbean island of St. Maarten. In 1961, Bearden joined the Cordier and Ekstrom Gallery in New York City, which would represent him for the rest of his career.

In the early 1960s in Harlem, Bearden was a founding member of the art group known as Spiral, formed "for the purpose of discussing the commitment of the Negro artist in the present struggle for civil liberties, and as a discussion group to consider common aesthetic problems." The first meeting was held in Bearden's studio on July 5, 1963, and was attended by Bearden, Hale Woodruff, Charles Alston, Norman Lewis, James Yeargans, Felrath Hines, Richard Mayhew, and William Pritchard. Woodruff was responsible for naming the group Spiral, suggesting the way in which the Archimedean spiral ascends upward as a symbol of progress. Over time the group expanded to include Merton Simpson, Emma Amos, Reginald Gammon, Alvin Hollingsworth, Calvin Douglas, Perry Ferguson, William Majors and Earle Miller. Stylistically the group ranged from Abstract Expressionists to social protest painters.

Bearden's collage work began in 1963 or 1964. He first combined images cut from magazines and colored paper, which he would often further alter with the use of sandpaper, bleach, graphite or paint. Bearden enlarged these collages through the photostat process. His project, called Projections, utilized such techniques. He created 21 large-scale collages using black-and-white photographic images. These collages occupy the viewer’s space rather than drawing them in to examine fine details. The imagery explored the African American experience, paying homage to their African heritage and culture. Building on the momentum from a successful exhibition of his photostat pieces at the Cordier and Ekstrom Gallery in 1964, Bearden was invited to do a solo exhibition at the Corcoran Gallery of Art in Washington, D.C. This heightened his public profile. Bearden's collage techniques changed over the years, and in later pieces he would use blown-up photostat photographic images, silk-screens, colored paper, and billboard pieces to create large collages on canvas and fiberboard. In 1970, he was awarded a Guggenheim Fellowship for Fine Arts.

In 1971, the Museum of Modern Art held a retrospective exhibition of Bearden's work, which traveled to the University Art Museum in Berkeley, California. The City of Berkeley then commissioned Bearden to create a mural for the City Council chambers. The sixteen-foot-wide mural, incorporating many visual aspects of the city in collage style, was installed in late 1973 and received positive reviews. It was taken down and loaned to a National Gallery of Art Bearden retrospective in 2003 that traveled to the San Francisco Museum of Modern Art, the Dallas Museum of Art, the High Museum of Art, and the Whitney Museum of American Art. Following that tour it has been in storage while the City Hall building has awaited a seismic retrofit and the city council has been meeting elsewhere. A portion of the mural inspired the city's current logo.

During the 1970s, he participated in a community art space called Communications Village operated by printmaker Benjamin Leroy Wigfall in Kingston, NY. Andrews made prints with the help of printer assistants who had been taught printmaking by Wigfall, and he exhibited there.

In the early 1980s, the Maryland Transit Authority commissioned Bearden $114,000 to create "Baltimore Uproar", a 14' x 46' Venetian glass mosaic for the Upton–Avenue Market station. Featuring Baltimore-native Billie Holiday, the mosaic was first built in Italy, and then reassembled upon arrival in Baltimore, before being unveiled in December 1982.

Following Bearden's death in March 1988, the Metropolitan Transit Authority in New York City unveiled City of Glass, a colored-glass installation situated within the Westchester Sq-E Tremont Av station on the 6 line, made by the artist in collaboration with Benoit Gilsoul and Helmut Schardt, the fabricators. Bearden had originally worked on the project in 1982.

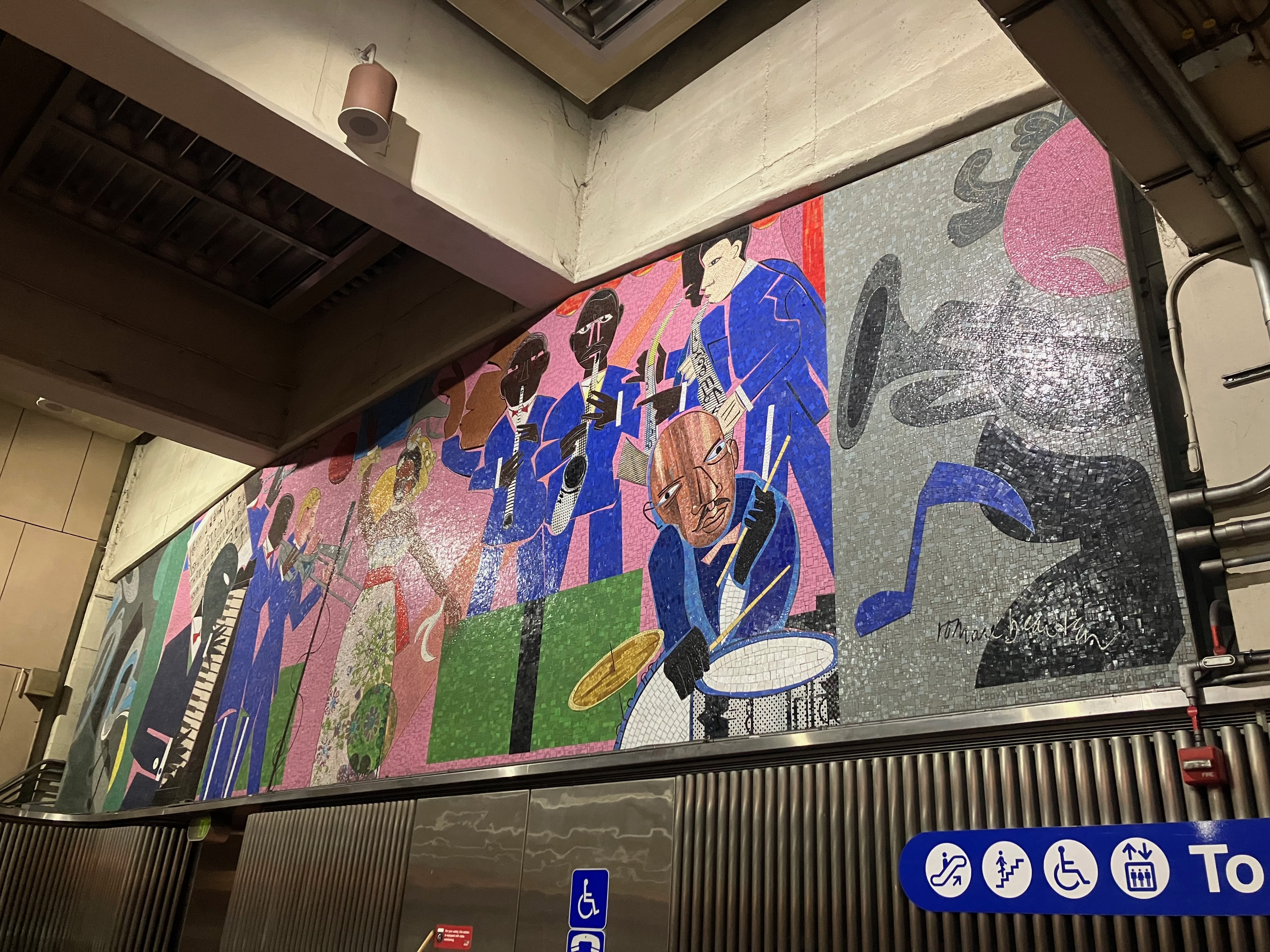
"Baltimore Uproar" (1982) in the Upton metro station, in Baltimore, Maryland.

== Personal life and death ==
In 1954, at age 42, Bearden married Nanette Rohan, a 27-year-old dancer from Staten Island, New York. She later became an artist and critic. The couple eventually created the Bearden Foundation to assist young artists.

Bearden died in New York City on March 12, 1988, due to complications from bone cancer. The New York Times described Bearden in its obituary as "one of America's pre-eminent artists" and "the nation's foremost collagist".

== Early works ==
His early works suggest the importance of African Americans' unity and cooperation. For instance, The Visitation implies the importance of collaboration of Black communities by depicting intimacy between two Black women who are holding hands. Bearden's vernacular realism represented in the work makes The Visitation noteworthy; he describes two figures in The Visitation somewhat realistically but does not fully follow pure realism, and distorts and exaggerates some parts of their bodies to "convey an experiential feeling or subjective disposition." Bearden said, "the Negro artists [...] must not be content with merely recording a scene as a machine. He must enter wholeheartedly into the situation he wishes to convey."

In 1942, Bearden produced Factory Workers (gouache on casein on brown kraft paper mounted on board), which was commissioned by Forbes magazine to accompany an article titled The Negro's War. The article "examined the social and financial costs of racial discrimination during wartime and advocated for full integration of the American workplace." Factory Workers and its companion piece Folk Musicians serve as prime examples of the influence that Mexican muralists played in Bearden's early work.

== Collage ==
Romare Bearden, The Calabash, collage, 1970, Library of Congress

Bearden had struggled with two artistic sides of himself: his background as "a student of literature and of artistic traditions, and being a black human being involves very real experiences, figurative and concrete," which was at combat with the mid-twentieth century "exploration of abstraction". His frustration with abstraction won over, as he himself described his paintings' focus as coming to a plateau. Bearden then turned to a completely different medium at a very important time for the country.

During the civil rights movement, Bearden started to experiment again, this time with forms of collage. After helping to found an artists group in support of civil rights, Bearden expressed representational and more overtly socially conscious aspects in his work. He used clippings from magazines, which in and of itself was a new medium, as glossy magazines were fairly new. He used these glossy scraps to incorporate modernity in his works, trying to show how African-American rights were moving forward, and so was his socially conscious art. In 1964, he held an exhibition he called Projections, where he introduced his new collage style. These works were very well received and are generally considered to be his best work.

Bearden had numerous museum and gallery shows of his work since then, including a 1971 show at the Museum of Modern Art entitled Prevalence of Ritual; an exhibition of his prints, entitled A Graphic Odyssey showing the work of the last fifteen years of his life; Exactitude Ain't Interesting, a 1992 show at Louis Stern's gallery in Beverly Hills which included late collages and watercolor; and the 2005 National Gallery of Art retrospective entitled The Art of Romare Bearden. In 2011, Michael Rosenfeld Gallery exhibited its second show of the artist's work, Romare Bearden (1911–1988): Collage, A Centennial Celebration, an intimate grouping of 21 collages produced between 1964 and 1983.

One of his most famous series, Prevalence of Ritual, concentrates mostly on southern African-American life. He used these collages to show his rejection of the Harmon Foundation's (a New York City arts organization) emphasis on the idea that African Americans must reproduce their culture in their art. Bearden found this approach to be a burden on African artists, because he saw the idea as creating an emphasis on reproduction of something that already exists in the world. He used this new series to speak out against this limitation on Black artists, and to emphasize modern art.

In this series, one of the pieces is entitled Baptism. Bearden was influenced by Francisco de Zurbarán, and based Baptism on Zurbarán's painting The Virgin Protectress of the Carthusians. Bearden wanted to show how the water that is about to be poured on the subject being baptized is always moving, giving the whole collage a feel and sense of temporal flux. He wanted to express how African Americans' rights were always changing, and society itself was in a temporal flux at the time. Bearden wanted to show that nothing is fixed, and expressed this idea throughout the image: not only is the subject about to have water poured from the top, but the subject is also to be submerged in water. Every aspect of the collage is moving and will never be the same more than once, which was congruent with society at the time.

In "The Art of Romare Bearden", Ruth Fine describes his themes as "universal". "A well-read man whose friends were other artists, writers, poets and jazz musicians, Bearden mined their worlds as well as his own for topics to explore. He took his imagery from both the everyday rituals of African American rural life in the south and urban life in the north, melding those American experiences with his personal experiences and with the themes of classical literature, religion, myth, music and daily human ritual."

In 2008 a 1984 mural by Romare Bearden in the Gateway Center subway station in Pittsburgh was estimated as worth $15 million, more than the cash-strapped transit agency expected. It raised questions about how it should be cared for once it is removed before the station is demolished.

"We did not expect it to be that much," Port Authority of Allegheny County spokeswoman Judi McNeil said. "We don't have the wherewithal to be a caretaker of such a valuable piece." It would cost the agency more than $100,000 a year to insure the 60-by-13-foot (18.3 by 4.0 m) tile mural, McNeil said. Bearden was paid $90,000 for the project, titled Pittsburgh Recollections. It was installed in 1984.

Before his death, Bearden claimed the collage fragments aided him to usher the past into the present: "When I conjure these memories, they are of the present to me, because after all, the artist is a kind of enchanter in time."

The Return of Odysseus, one of his collage works held by the Art Institute of Chicago, exemplifies Bearden's effort to represent African-American rights in a form of collage. This collage describes one of the scenes in Homer's epic Odyssey, in which the hero Odysseus is returning home from his long journey. The viewer's eye is first captured by the main figure, Odysseus, situated at the center of the work and reaching his hand to his wife. All the figures are black, enlarging the context of the Greek legend. This is one of the ways in which Bearden works to represent African-American rights; by replacing white characters with blacks, he attempts to defeat the rigidity of historical roles and stereotypes and open up the possibilities and potential of blacks. "Bearden may have seen Odysseus as a strong mental model for the African-American community, which had endured its own adversities and setbacks." By portraying Odysseus as black, Bearden maximizes the potential for empathy by black audiences.

Bearden said that he used collage because "he felt that art portraying the lives of African Americans did not give full value to the individual. [...] In doing so he was able to combine abstract art with real images so that people of different cultures could grasp the subject matter of the African American culture: The people. This is why his theme always exemplified people of color." In addition, he said that collage's technique of gathering several pieces together to create one assembled work "symbolizes the coming together of tradition and communities."

== Music ==
In addition to painting, collage, and athletics, Bearden enjoyed music and even composed a number of songs.

In 1960, Loften Mitchell released the three act play, Star of the Morning, for which he wrote the script and music, and Bearden and Clyde Fox wrote the lyrics.

A selection of them can be heard on the 2003 album Romare Bearden Revealed, created by the Branford Marsalis Quartet.

No.	Title	Length
1.	"I'm Slappin' Seventh Avenue" (Duke Ellington/Irving Mills/Henry Nemo)	2:01
2.	"Jungle Blues" (Jelly Roll Morton)	8:48
3.	"Seabreeze" (Fred Norman/Larry Douglas/Romare Bearden)	6:13
4.	"J Mood" (Wynton Marsalis)	10:48
5.	"B's Paris Blues" (Branford Marsalis)	4:27
6.	"Autumn Lamp" (Doug Wamble)	2:52
7.	"Steppin' on the Blues" (Lovie Austin/Jimmy O'Bryant/Tommy Ladnier)	4:53
8.	"Laughin' and Talkin' with Higg" (Jeff "Tain" Watts)	10:40
9.	"Carolina Shout" (James P. Johnson)	2:35

== Legacy ==
The Romare Bearden Foundation was founded two years after his death. The non-profit organization is not only Bearden's official estate; it helps "to preserve and perpetuate the legacy of this preeminent American artist." As of 2015 it has been developing grant-giving programs aimed at funding and supporting children, young (emerging) artists, and scholars.

In Charlotte, a street was named after Bearden, intersecting West Boulevard on the west side of the city. Romare Bearden Drive is lined by the West Boulevard Public Library and rows of townhouses.

Inside the Charlotte-Mecklenburg Main Library (310 N. Tryon Street) is Bearden's mosaic, Before Dawn. After Bearden's death Nanette Rohan, his widow, selected a 12-by-18-inch (300 mm × 460 mm) collage of his to be recreated in smalti (glass tiles) by Crovatto Mosaics in Spilimbergo, Italy for the grand reopening gala (June 18, 1989) of the "new" library. She was honored at the ceremony for her contribution. The reinterpreted work is 9 feet (2.7 m) tall and 13.5 feet (4.1 m) wide.

The ground breaking for Romare Bearden Park in Charlotte was on September 2, 2011 and the completed park opened in late August 2013. It is situated on a 5.2-acre (2.1 ha) parcel which is located in Third Ward between Church and Mint streets. Bearden lived near the new park for a time as a child, at the corner of what is now MLK Boulevard and Graham Street. The park design is based on work of public artist Norie Sato. Her concepts were inspired by his multimedia collages. Fittingly, the park serves as an entryway to a minor league baseball stadium, BB&T Charlotte Knights Ballpark.

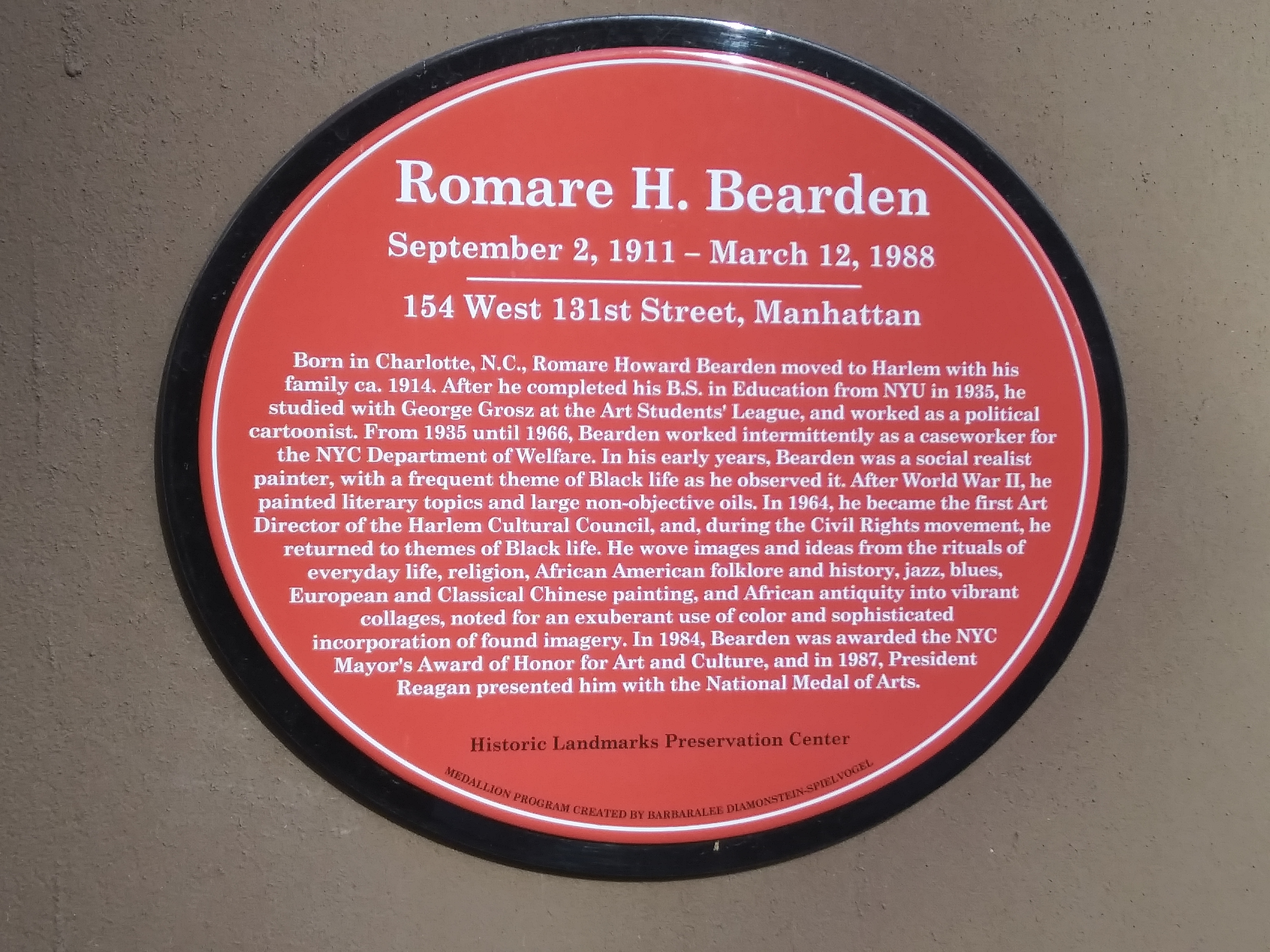
A plaque at Romare Bearden's home in Harlem, 2002

Bearden's home in Harlem, New York is a Historic Landmark Preservation site.

In 2004, the Metropolitan Museum of Art exhibited Romare Bearden at the Met, drawing on works in the Metropolitan Museum of Art collection including his 1971 The Block.

DC Moore Gallery currently represents the estate of Romare Bearden. The first exhibition of his works at the gallery was in September 2008. In 2014-15, Columbia University hosted a major Smithsonian Institution travelling exhibition of Bearden's work and an accompanying series of lectures, readings, performances, and other events celebrating the artist. On display at the Miriam and Ira D. Wallach Gallery on Columbia's Morningside campus, and also at Columbia's Global Centers in Paris and Istanbul, Romare Bearden: A Black Odyssey focused on the cycle of collages and watercolors Bearden completed in 1977 based on Homer's epic poem, The Odyssey.

Playwright August Wilson was inspired by Bearden's collages and saw his own working process as similar to that of a collagist piecing together representations of Black life. Bearden's Mill Hand's Lunch Bucket became the inspiration for the character of Herald Loomis in Joe Turner's Come and Gone.

For a 2005 U.S. postal stamp sheet commemorating ten important milestones of the Civil Rights Movement, Beardon's 1984 lithograph "The Lamp" was selected to illustrate the 1954 Brown v. Board of Education Supreme Court decision.

In 2011, the U.S. Postal Service released a set of Forever stamps featuring four of Bearden's paintings during a first-day-of-issuance ceremony at the Schomburg Center for Research in Black Culture.

From January 15–August 8, 2010, the Metropolitan Museum of Art exhibited Romare Bearden's The Block, Bearden's 1971 mural collage, including preliminary sketches and photographs (all in the Met's collection). From August 30, 2011 – March 4, 2012, the Metropolitan Museum of Art exhibited Romare Bearden (1911–1988): A Centennial Celebration.

Bearden was the subject of two exhibits at the High Museum of Art. The first, A Painter’s Profile: The High Celebrates Romare Bearden, was exhibited January 10 – July 5, 2015, and celebrated their “recent acquisition of Romare Bearden’s only known self portrait, Profile/Part II, The Thirties: Artist with Painting and Model (1981).” The second exhibit “Something Over Something Else”: Romare Bearden’s Profile Series was exhibited September 14, 2019 – February 2, 2020, and reassembled his Profile series that were exhibited at the Cordier & Ekstrom Gallery in New York where Part I was exhibited in 1979 and Part II in 1981.

In 2017, the Virginia Museum of Fine Arts in Richmond announced acquisition of Romare Bearden's collage, Three Folk Musicians, as part of the museum's permanent collection. The collage, which shows two guitar players and a banjo player, is often cited in art history books. It was shown at the VMFA for the first time in February 2017 in the museum's mid- to late 20th-century galleries.

From November 21, 2019 to 8 March 2020, the British Museum exhibited Troy: Myth and Reality which included the 1977 collage The Sirens' Song.

From May 3–September 15, 2024, the Saint Louis Art Museum exhibited Romare Bearden: Resonances, that “highlight[ed] modernist artist Romare Bearden and his relationships with other artists in the Museum’s collection.”

== Published works ==
- Lil Dan, the Drummer Boy, New York: Simon & Schuster, 2003

coauthor:

- with Harry Henderson, Six Black Masters of American Art, New York: Doubleday, 1972
- with Carl Holty, The Painter's Mind, Taylor & Francis, originally published in 1969
- with Harry Henderson, of A History of African-American Artists. From 1792 to The Present, New York: Pantheon Books 1993

== Honors and awards ==
- Founded the 306 Group, a club for Harlem artists
- In 1966, Bearden was elected to the American Academy of Arts and Letters
- In 1972, he was elected to the National Institute of Arts and Letters
- In 1978, Bearden was elected into the National Academy of Design as an Associate member
- In 1987, the year before he died, he was awarded the National Medal of Arts
- In 2002, scholar Molefi Kete Asante listed Romare Bearden on his list of 100 Greatest African Americans.
- Guggenheim Fellowship, 1970
- Ford Foundation Fellowship, 1973
- Medal of the State of North Carolina, 1976
- Frederick Douglas Medal, New York Urban League, 1978
- James Weldon Johnson Award, Atlanta Chapter of NAACP, 1978

== Works of art ==
- Abstract (painting)
- Baltimore Uproar, 1982, Upton–Avenue Market station
- The Blues (collage) – 1975, Honolulu Museum of Art
- The Calabash (collage) – 1970, Library of Congress
- Carolina Shout (collage) This is eponymous with the musical composition by Bearden family friend, the "dean of jazz pianists" and composer, James P. Johnson. This appears to be more than a coincidence, as the name of Bearden's mother, Bessye (sic), is listed on the letterhead of an organization called, " Friends of James P. Johnson" An audio recording of Carolina Shout, featuring Harry Connick Jr. on piano, is included on the companion CD to the National Gallery of Art Exhibition, Romare Bearden Revealed, by Branford Marsalis. – The Mint Museum of Art
- City of Glass, 1988, Westchester Sq-E Tremont Av station, NY
- Common Man, 1963
- The Dove, 1964
- Falling Star (painting)
- The Family, 1941
- The Family, 1975
- Fisherman (painting)
- "Jammin' at the Savoy" (painting)
- The Lantern (painting)
- Last of the Blue Devils
- Madonna and Child (collage) – ca. 1968-1970, Minnesota Museum of American Art
- Mill Hand's Lunch Bucket (collage)
- Morning of the Rooster
- Patchwork Quilt (collage) – 1970, Museum of Modern Art
- Pepper Jelly Lady (color lithograph), Minnesota Museum of American Art
- Piano Lesson (painting) – Pennsylvania Academy of the Fine Arts, inspired the play The Piano Lesson
- Pittsburgh Memory (collage) – 1964, Collection of w, New York. Used as album art for the Roots album ...And Then You Shoot Your Cousin.
- Prevalence of Ritual: Tidings (collage)
- Recollection Pond (tapestry) – 1974–1990, 7 plus 1 artist's proof/8 made, Mount Holyoke College Art Museum; Port Authority of NY & NJ; York College, City University of New York; The Metropolitan Museum of Art
- Return of the Prodigal Son – 1967, Albright-Knox Art Gallery
- Rocket to the Moon (collage)
- She-Ba
- Showtime (painting)
- Soul Three (collage) – 1968, Dallas Museum of Art
- Summertime (collage) – 1967, Saint Louis Art Museum
- The Woodshed
- Wrapping it up at the Lafayette

== Selected collections ==
- Art Museum of Southeast Texas, Beaumont, Texas
- Art Museum of West Virginia University, Morgantown, West Virginia
- Madison Museum of Contemporary Art, Madison, Wisconsin
- Metropolitan Museum of Art, New York, New York
- Minneapolis Institute of Art, Minneapolis, Minnesota
- Minnesota Museum of American Art, St. Paul, Minnesota
- Museum of Fine Arts, Boston, Massachusetts
- Museum of Modern Art
- National Gallery of Art, Washington, D. C.
- Pérez Art Museum Miami, Florida
- Saint Louis Art Museum, Saint Louis, Missouri
- Whitney Museum of American Art, New York, New York

== See also ==
- African-American art
- List of Federal Art Project artists

== Works cited ==
- Bearden, Romare, Jerald L. Melberg, and Albert Murray. Romare Bearden, 1970-1980: An Exhibition. Charlotte, N.C.: Mint Museum, 1980.
- Brown, Kevin (1995). Romare Bearden. New York: Chelsea House. ISBN 0-7910-1119-4. OCLC 29878239.
- East End/East Liberty Historical Society (January 16, 2008). Pittsburgh's East Liberty Valley. Arcadia Publishing. ISBN 978-1-4396-3574-2.
- Bearden, Romare; Ruth Fine; Jacqueline Francis (2011). Romare Bearden, American Modernist. National Gallery of Art. ISBN 978-0-300-12161-2.
- Bearden, Romare; Ruth Fine; Mary Lee Corlett; National Gallery of Art (U.S.) (2003). The Art of Romare Bearden. National Gallery of Art. ISBN 978-0-89468-302-2.
- Greene, Carroll (1971). Romare Bearden: the prevalence of ritual. New York: Museum of Modern Art. ISBN 0-87070-251-3. OCLC 135988.
- Romare Bearden Foundation. "Romare Bearden Foundation Biography". Archived from the original on November 24, 2005.
- Vaughn, William (2000). Encyclopedia of Artists. Oxford University Press, Inc. ISBN 0-19-521572-9.
- Witkovsky, Matthew S. 1989. "Experience vs. Theory: Romare Bearden and Abstract Expressionism". Black American Literature Forum, Vol. 23, No. 2, Fiction Issue pp. 257–282.
- Yenser, Thomas, ed. (1932). Who's Who in Colored America: A Biographical Dictionary of Notable Living Persons of African Descent in America (Third ed.). Who's Who in Colored America, Brooklyn, New York. [Provides biography of mother, Bessye J. Bearden]
