= Nanette Bearden =

American choreographer, dancer, and model (1927–1996)

- Born: Nanette Rohan; January 20, 1927; Staten Island, New York
- Died: August 10, 1996 (aged 69); Staten Island, New York
- Education: Fashion Institute of Technology; Martha Graham School of Contemporary Dance; Clark Center for the Performing Arts; Luigi Dance Center
- Occupations: choreographer; dancer; model
- Spouse: Romare Bearden
- Career
- Former groups: New World Dancers

Nanette Bearden (née Rohan; January 20, 1927 – August 10, 1996) was an American choreographer, dancer, artistic director, and model. She founded the Nanette Bearden Contemporary Dance Theater and the Romare Bearden Foundation.

== Early life and education ==
Nanette Rohan was born on January 20, 1927 on Staten Island, New York, one of eight daughters born to immigrants from French Saint Martin.

She studied modeling at the Fashion Institute of Technology and was active in fashion modeling in the 1950s. In September 1954, she married the artist Romare Bearden.

Bearden later studied dance at the Martha Graham School of Contemporary Dance, the Clark Center for the Performing Arts, and at the Luigi Dance Center.

== Dance career ==
Bearden performed with the New World Dancers during 1971–1974 and was the director of the Broadway Dance Festival (1975–1976). Bearden founded the Chamber Dance Group in 1976, which then became the Nanette Bearden Contemporary Dance Theatre in 1977. She was also its artistic director.

== Later life ==
Bearden established a fine arts gallery on the island of St. Martin and promoted local artists there.

=== Romare Bearden Foundation ===
Romare Bearden died in 1988. His wish before his death was for a foundation to preserve his art work and promote "rising artists of color". Nanette Bearden resolved to create a foundation in his name and his estate established a nonprofit organization, the Romare Bearden Foundation in 1990. She was its president from 1990 until 1996 when she died. Her sisters and then her niece have continued overseeing the foundation.

=== Death ===
On August 10, 1996, Bearden died of a pulmonary embolism at St. Vincent's Medical Center on Staten Island.

Upon her death, the Nanette Bearden Contemporary Dance Theatre was dissolved. It was re-established in 2004 by her sister, Sheila Rohan who had performed with the dance theatre.
