= APEX Museum =

Historical museum in Atlanta, Georgia

Coordinates: 33°45′19″N 84°22′59″W

The APEX Museum ("African American Panoramic Experience") is a museum of history presented from the black perspective. It is located on Auburn Avenue in the Sweet Auburn historic district of Atlanta, Georgia.

The Apex Museum was founded in 1978 by Mr. Dan Moore.

The mission of the African-American Panoramic Experience (APEX) Museum is to accurately interpret and present history from an African-American perspective in order to help all American and international visitors better understand and appreciate the contributions of African-Americans to America as well as the world.

== History ==
The APEX Museum sits in the historic John Wesley Dobbs building in Atlanta's Sweet Auburn historic district. The building was built in 1910 and originally housed the Atlanta Book Depository before being turned into a tire warehouse during the 1970s. The APEX Museum was founded in 1978 by the filmmaker Dan Moore Sr. The E. R. Mitchell Construction company was responsible for renovation and restoration of the building, after which the APEX Museum moved in; it has been operating continuously in the same space since its founding.

The APEX Museum now an important part of the African-American historic and cultural center of Sweet Auburn. It is located next to the Auburn Avenue Research Library and near a variety of African-American museums, businesses and historic sites. The APEX Museum is listed as a site on the U. S. Civil Rights Trail.
