= Odle =

Odle may refer to:

- Odle (app), a social translation-based mobile app
- Odle Middle School, a public middle school in Bellevue, Washington, United States
- Alan Odle (1888–1948), English illustrator
- Robert Odle (1944–2019), American lawyer
- Odles Group, a group of mountains in the Dolomites, Italy
