= 999 Peachtree =

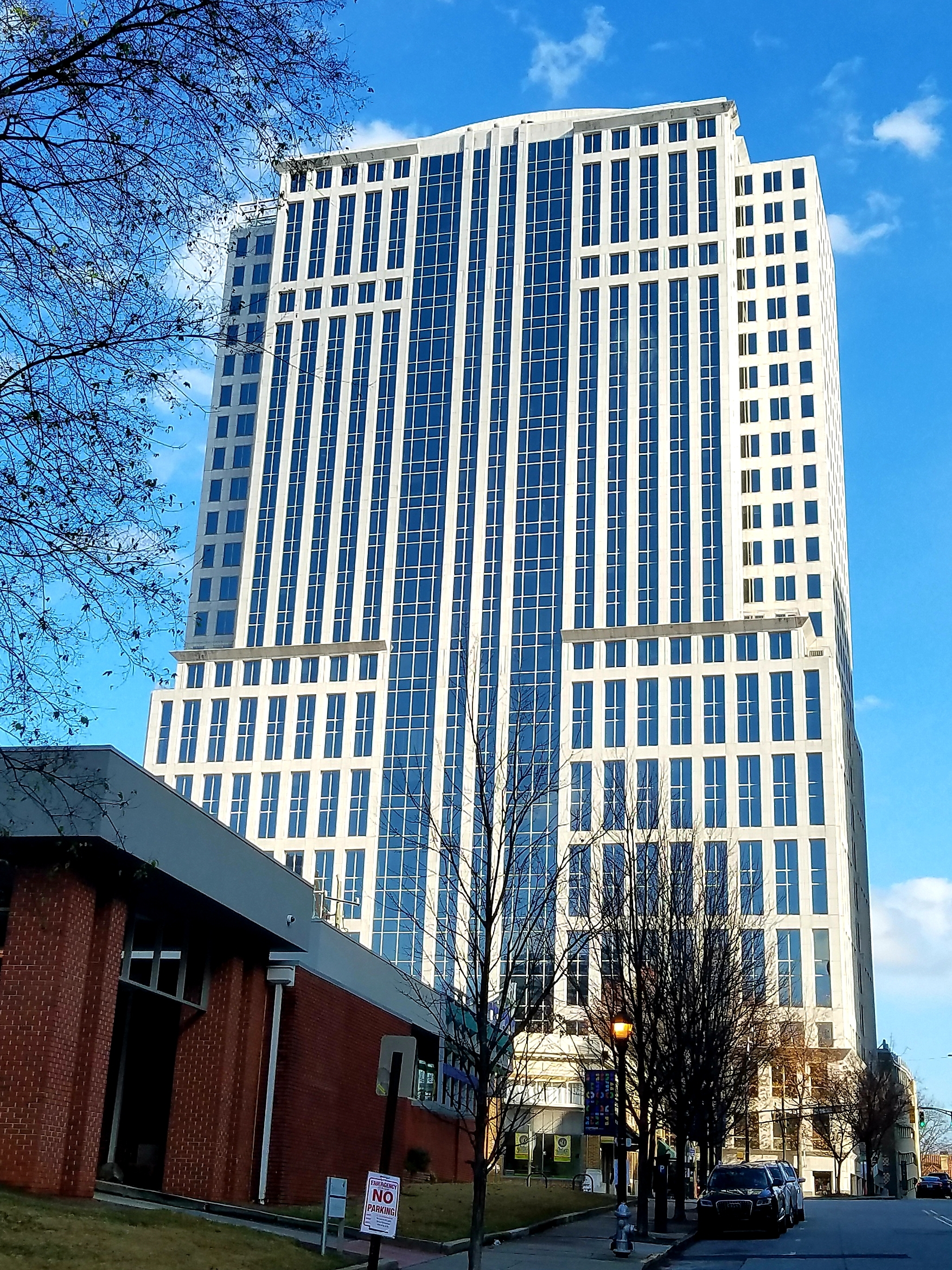
- 999 Peachtree in 2019

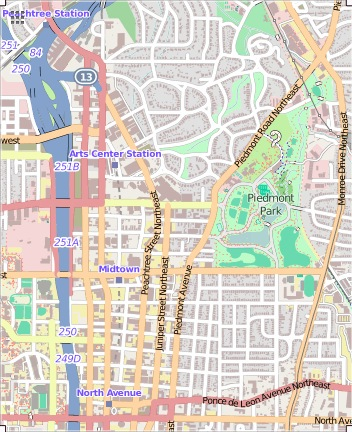
- Location within Atlanta Midtown 999 Peachtree (Atlanta) 999 Peachtree (Georgia) 999 Peachtree (the United States)
- Former names: First Union Plaza

General information
- Status: Completed
- Type: Office
- Architectural style: Postmodern
- Location: 999 Peachtree Street NE; Atlanta, Georgia 30309
- Coordinates: 33.7811°N 84.3837°W
- Completed: 1987

Height
- Height: 396 ft (121 m)

Technical details
- Floor count: 28 + basement
- Lifts/elevators: 11

Design and construction
- Architect: John Cheek
- Architecture firm: Heery Architects and Engineers
- Services engineer: Joe Gottardy PE

Website
- www.999peachtree.com

999 Peachtree is a high-rise class A office building in Midtown Atlanta, Georgia. Built in 1987 by Heery Architects and Engineers, the building is situated on the Midtown Mile, at the intersection of Peachtree Street and Tenth Street.

== History ==
The building was designed in 1985/86 by Heery Architects and Engineers, with John Cheek as the project architect and Joe Gottardy as the lead mechanical engineer. Construction was completed in 1987. Originally called First Union Plaza, the building served as the headquarters for First Union National Bank of Georgia, which later merged into First Union. In 1988, the Atlanta-based law firm Sutherland Asbill & Brennan LLP moved into the location. Following a 2017 merger with Eversheds, the firm rebranded as Eversheds Sutherland and departed 999 Peachtree in 2026 for Bank of America Plaza.

In February 2007, the property was purchased by Jamestown L.P. The following year, Jamestown hired Cousins Properties to manage the property. In 2010, the restaurant Empire State South opened on the ground floor of the building. Jamestown sold the property in 2013 to Franklin Street Properties for $157.9 million. Shortly after the purchase, Franklin announced that Hines Interests Limited Partnership had been chosen to manage the property. In 2019, the building received LEED Platinum certification from the U.S. Green Building Council.

On October 22, 2021, Piedmont Office Realty Trust acquired the property from Franklin Street Properties for $223.9 million. Following the acquisition, Piedmont began a major renovation project to update the property's entrance, main lobby, outdoor plaza, and building amenities, with construction commencing in 2022. Empire State South closed in March 2023. The vacated restaurant suite was subsequently leased by Lazy Betty, a Michelin-starred restaurant that relocated to the building in March 2024.
