= Proskauer Rose =

American law firm

Proskauer Rose LLP
- Headquarters: 11 Times Square; New York City; United States
- No. of offices: 11
- No. of attorneys: 800+
- Major practice areas: Full service law firm
- Key people: Timothy W. Mungovan, Firm Chairman
- Revenue: $1,230,482,000 USD (2023)
- Date founded: 1875
- Founder: William R. Rose
- Company type: Limited Liability Partnership
- Website: www.proskauer.com

Proskauer Rose LLP (formerly known as Proskauer, Rose, Goetz & Mendelsohn, LLP) is an international law firm headquartered in New York City. Proskauer was founded in 1875 and currently employs more than 800 attorneys in eleven offices worldwide.

The firm has served as outside counsel for major professional sports leagues, including the National Basketball Association and the National Hockey League.

== History ==
Throughout its history, the firm's headquarters has been located in the area of Times Square, in midtown Manhattan, where it grew from fewer than a dozen lawyers originally to nearly 800. A full-service practice, it is currently among the ten largest law firms in New York City.

William R. Rose started the firm that is now Proskauer when, at 21 years of age, he opened a law firm on Broadway in Downtown Manhattan in 1875. In 1907, Rose promoted associate Benjamin Paskus to partner and renamed the firm Rose & Paskus. Rose & Paskus was one of the first firms to develop a specialized tax practice after the passage of the Sixteenth Amendment to the United States Constitution in 1913. In 1930, Judge Joseph M. Proskauer resigned his position on New York's Appellate Division to join the firm, which was then renamed Proskauer, Rose & Paskus. Having used the shortened form for some time, the firm shortened its name to Proskauer Rose in 1997.

The firm has historically focused its practice on labor and employment law, as well as building up significant litigation, private capital, health care, sports and entertainment, bankruptcy, and taxation practices. With offices in seven cities as of 2009, it advises clients in more than forty distinct practice areas.

== Revenue and profitability ==
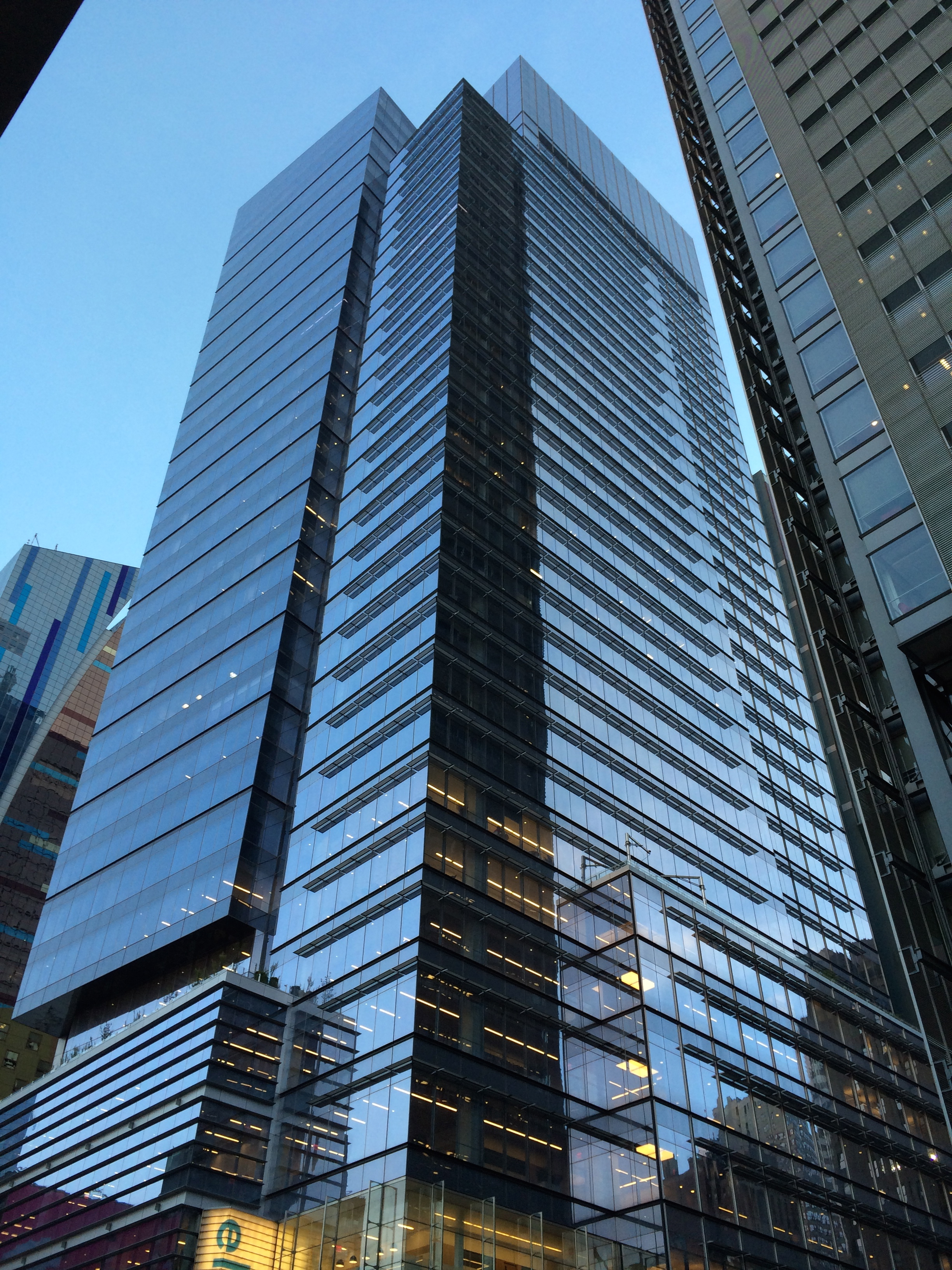
11 Times Square photographed from the southeast corner of West 41st Street and Eighth Avenue

In February 2012, Proskauer increased its gross revenue by 6.4 percent to $686 million and its average profits per partner 9 percent to $1.7 million, according to The American Lawyer's reporting. In 2013, Proskauer again increased its revenue by more than 7%, to over $700 million. These figures place Proskauer as one of the fastest growing law firms in the United States. The firm's robust financial performance came amid a busy year for office moves. The most significant shuffle saw Proskauer move its New York headquarters to 11 Times Square in January, 2011. Proskauer saw gross revenue of $1.23 billion in 2023, up from $990 million in 2020.

== Pro bono ==
In 2012, Proskauer argued before the U.S. Supreme Court in a ruling that the Fair Sentencing Act of 2010 (FSA), which reduced the disparity in federal sentencing between crack and powder cocaine offenses, applies to defendants who were sentenced after its passage even though their offenses pre-dated the law. The firm is also noted for hosting an Election Protection call center during every election cycle since the 2012 Presidential election.

In 2010, Proskauer received the Law Firm Pro Bono Award at the William O. Douglas Award Dinner.

== Notable clients and cases ==
- Proskauer Rose represented Silverstein Properties, owner of the World Trade Center towers in New York that were destroyed by the terrorist attack on September 11, 2001, in a dispute with its insurers.
- The firm won a copyright case in 2006 when they represented the rock band The White Stripes against a former producer regarding the ownership rights in the band's first two albums.
- The firm represented the League of American Theatres and Producers during the stagehands strike in the fall of 2007.
- The Association of Community Organizations for Reform Now (ACORN) hired Proskauer in 2009 to conduct an investigation into its operations and write a report regarding the undercover video controversy.
- In 2015, Last Week Tonight host John Oliver employed the firm to purchase a $9.5 million Manhattan penthouse using several shell companies set up on his behalf by the firm, taking advantage of a tax loophole called 421-a to reduce his property tax bill by as much as $300,000.
- In 2017, Proskauer Rose represented Celgene in its $9 billion acquisition of cancer drug maker Juno Therapeutics.
- In 2019, Proskauer Rose represented the Big East Conference as it readmitted the University of Connecticut back to the Big East.

== Notable alumni ==
- Gary Bettman, Commissioner of the National Hockey League
- Lloyd Blankfein, CEO of Goldman Sachs
- David Braun, music industry lawyer, former lawyer of Bob Dylan and president of Polygram Records
- Michael A. Cardozo, former President of the New York City Bar Association
- Robert A. Gorman (born 1937), law professor at the University of Pennsylvania Law School
- Sylvan Gotshal, co-founder of Weil, Gotshal & Manges
- David Kahn, President of basketball operations for the Minnesota Timberwolves
- Steven C. Krane, partner and general counsel
- Doug Perlman, founder of Sports Media Advisors
- Moose Scheib, founder and CEO of LoanMod.com
- David Stern, Commissioner of the National Basketball Association
- Frank Weil, co-founder of Weil, Gotshal & Manges
- Joseph M. Proskauer, New York Supreme Court judge and name partner of the firm

== See also ==
- List of largest United States-based law firms by profits per partner
