= Manges (surname) =

Manges is a surname. Notable people with the surname include:

- Clinton Manges (1923–2010), American oil tycoon
- Horace Manges (1898–1986), American lawyer
- Mark Manges (1956–2023), American football player

== See also ==
- Manges (Greece)
