= Risk quotient =

Measure of a person's risk inclination

Risk quotient (RQ) as it pertains to human behavior is a measure of a person's natural level of risk inclination. Researched and defined by author and professional skydiver Jim McCormick in behavioral sciences, RQ builds on the concept of risk quotient operative in finance and both environmental and medical science. RQ is represented as a numeric score based on a self-assessment documented in four books.

== History ==
Risk quotient in the context of human behavior was first defined in a 2008 book The Power of Risk by Jim McCormick, former COO of Anshen & Allen, and founder of The Research Institute for Risk Intelligence. Its genesis was the result of using a test instrument developed by McCormick in empirical research to collect data on risk-taking ability and predisposition toward risk. In October 2015, he introduced the concept to attendees at The Risk Institute of Ohio State University annual conference in a session titled "Risks—Ideas Worth Talking About".

== Definitions ==
The 2012 edition of The First-Time Manager, provides the following descriptions of the different types of risk considered in determining RQ:

1. Physical – Activities that involve some risk of injury. Riding a motorcycle, river rafting, rock climbing, or skydiving are some examples.
2. Career – Risks such as job changes, taking on new responsibilities, or seeking promotions.
3. Financial – Risk tolerance in investing, borrowing, and lending money.
4. Social – Risks such as introducing oneself to a stranger in an unfamiliar social situation even at the risk of possible embarrassment.
5. Intellectual – Things such as willingness to study a difficult topic, pursue information that challenges convictions, or read an intellectually challenging book.
6. Creative – Risks such as painting, drawing, taking on a writing challenge, or pursuing an unconventional design.
7. Relationship – Risks such as a willingness to pursue a new relationship, spend time with someone despite an uncertain outcome, or make a relationship commitment.
8. Emotional – Willingness to be emotionally vulnerable.
9. Spiritual – Willingness to place trust in concepts that may be impossible to prove or are not easily understood.

The numeric value resulting from the test is relative rather than absolute in the same way that most psychological testing provides relative results. The norm is a mid-point and variances to the lower or upper end of a 1-10 scale provide a measurement of RQ.

== Criticism ==
Self-assessments have long been associated with faked results in environments and situations where it would be considered "more positive" or "more negative" to have results skewed in a particular direction. Research has also noted that respondents sometimes chose to give the most extreme response. While contamination of responses is always a possibility, the advantage to doing so with the RQ measurement tool is not clear. It is an individual test instrument, not intended to identify relative risk inclination in teams and companies.
