= Maryann Karinch =

American writer

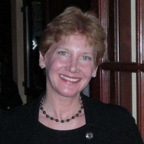
Maryann Karinch in 2007

Maryann Karinch is an American author, literary agent, and a speaker and consultant on body language. She is also known for her athletic endeavors including completion of the first Eco-Challenge and regional awards in body building and gymnastics.

== Education ==
Karinch attended Catholic schools in Lebanon, PA and graduated valedictorian of the class of 1970 at Lebanon Catholic High School. She earned her B.A. degree in 1974 and M.A. degree in 1979, both in Speech and Drama, from The Catholic University of America. where she served as sports editor of the university newspaper during her senior year.

== Career ==
While earning her master's degree, Karinch taught briefly at Tabor Academy in Marion, Massachusetts before becoming managing director of the New Playwrights' Theater in Washington, DC. She then served as Development Officer for Capital Children's Museum (now National Children's Museum). For seven years, she was Director of Communications for the Computer and Business Equipment Industry Association (now Information Technology Industry Council), and then headed public relations activities for the Federal Systems Group of Apple, Inc. In 1993, she launched a communications consulting business and began publishing books in 1994. In 2004, she founded The Rudy Agency, a full-service literary agency, and has placed more than 150 properties with commercial publishers. As of December, 2020, she has 32 commercially published works. Karinch is also a blogger for Psychology Today.She is also listed as a senior executive at Armin Lear Press, a book publishing company.

== Athletics ==
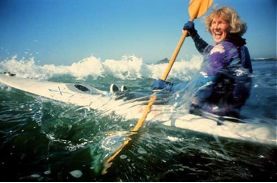
Kayaking in Half Moon Bay, California in 2001 Photograph by Michael Powers

Karinch held top ranking in intercollegiate gymnastics in the Washington DC area from fall 1971 to spring 1973.

In 1995, she was part of a five-person team that completed the first Eco-Challenge, a 376-mile adventure race staged in southern Utah. Of the fifty teams that began the grueling ten-day event, only twenty-one officially finished the race. In 1998, she earned the status of Certified Personal Trainer with the American Council on Exercise, an accreditation she continues to carry.

== Published works ==
- Karinch, Maryann; Sima Dimitrijev (April 8, 2021). Trial, Error, and Success. Armin Lear Press. ISBN 978-1-73561-748-0.
- Karinch, Maryann; Alastair Storm Browne (February 9, 2021). Cosmic Careers: Exploring the Universe of Opportunities in the Space Industries. HarperCollins Leadership. ISBN 978-1-40022-093-9.
- Karinch, Maryann (July 23, 2020) (2nd Ed). Game Plan for Getting Published. Armin Lear Press. ISBN 978-1-73516-988-0.
- Karinch, Maryann; Gregory Hartley (November 1, 2019). Get People to Do What You Want: How to Use body Language and Words for Maximum Effect (2nd ed). Red Wheel/Weiser. ISBN 978-1-63265-158-7.
- Karinch, Maryann (July 8, 2019). Mature Sexual Intimacy: Making Menopause a Turning Point not an Ending (1st ed). Rowman & Littlefield. ISBN 978-1-53811-395-0.
- Karinch, Maryann; James O. Pyle (October 1, 2018). Control the Conversation: How to Charm, Deflect and Defend Your Position Through Any Line of Questioning (1st ed). Red Wheel/Weiser. ISBN 978-1-63265-143-3.
- Karinch, Maryann; Robert Kaluza (April 17, 2018). Deepwater Deception: The Truth About the Tragic Blowout & Perversion of American Justice (1st ed). Armin Lear Press ISBN 978-1-94691-816-1.
- Karinch, Maryann; Jim McCormick (December 27, 2017). Body Language Sales Secrets: How to Read Prospects and Decode Subconscious Signals to Get Results and Close the Deal (1st ed). Red Wheel/Weiser. ISBN 978-1-63265-118-1.
- Karinch, Maryann; Saketh Guntupalli, MD; foreword by Camille Grammer (July 8, 2017). Sex and Cancer: Intimacy, Romance, and Love After Diagnosis and Treatment (1st ed). Rowman & Littlefield. ISBN 978-1-4422-7508-9.
- Karinch, Maryann; Gregory Hartley (February 20, 2017). The Art of Body Talk: How to Decode Gestures, Mannerisms, and Other Non-Verbal Messages (1st ed). Career Press. ISBN 978-1-63265-077-1.
- Karinch, Maryann; Chris Spinelli, DO (December 15, 2015). The Vaccination Debate: Making the Right Choice for You and Your Children (1st ed). New Horizon Press. ISBN 978-0882825052.
- Karinch, Maryann; foreword by E. Peter Earnest (January 19, 2015). Nothing But the Truth: Secrets from Top Intelligence Experts to Control Conversations and Get the Information You Need (1st ed). Career Press. ISBN 978-1601633521
- Karinch, Maryann; Trevor Crow (October 20, 2013). Forging Healthy Connections: How Relationships Fight Illness, Aging and Depression (1st ed). New Horizon Press. ISBN 978-0882824529
- Karinch, Maryann; James O. Pyle (January 20, 2014). Find Out Anything from Anyone, Anytime: Secrets of Calculated Questioning from a Veteran Interrogator (1st ed). Career Press. ISBN 978-1601632982
- Karinch, Maryann; John A. Biever, MD; foreword by Mark Whitacre (August 9, 2012). The Wandering Mind: Understanding Dissociation from Daydreams to Disorders (1st ed). Rowman & Littlefield. ISBN 978-1442216150.
- Karinch, Maryann; E. Peter Earnest (November 17, 2010). Business Confidential: Lessons for Corporate Success from Inside the CIA (1st ed). AMACOM. ISBN 978-0-8144-1448-4.
- Karinch, Maryann; Gregory Hartley (February 2, 2011). The Most Dangerous Business Book You'll Ever Read (1st ed). John Wiley & Sons. ISBN 978-0-470-88802-5.
- Karinch, Maryann; Gregory Hartley (January 20, 2010). The Body Language Handbook: How to Read Everyone's Hidden Thoughts and Intentions (1st ed.). Career Press. ISBN 978-1-60163-076-6.
- Karinch, Maryann; Ronald L. Kotler (November 18, 2009). 365 Ways to Get a Good Night Sleep (1st ed.). Adams Media. ISBN 978-1-60550-101-7.
- Karinch, Maryann; Jim McCormick (July 9, 2009). Business Lessons from the Edge - Learn How Extreme Athletes Use Intelligent Risk Taking to Succeed in Business (1st ed.). McGraw-Hill. ISBN 978-0-07-162698-9.
- Karinch, Maryann; Gregory Hartley (June 1, 2008). Get People to Do What You Want: How to Use Body Language and Words to Attract People You Like and Avoid the Ones You Don't (1st ed.). Career Press. ISBN 978-1-56414-993-0.
- Karinch, Maryann; Gregory Hartley (July 23, 2008). How to Be an Expert on Anything in Two Hours (1st ed.). AMACOM. ISBN 978-0-8144-0992-3.
- Karinch, Maryann; Gregory Hartley (March 1, 2008). Date Decoder: Military Intelligence Techniques to Expose What He's Really Thinking (1st ed.). Polka Dot Press. ISBN 978-1-59869-421-5.
- Karinch, Maryann; Gregory Hartley (March 30, 2007). I Can Read You Like a Book: How to Spot Messages and Emotions People Are Really Sending with Their Body Language (1st ed.). Career Press. ISBN 978-1-56414941-1.
- Karinch, Maryann; Gregory Hartley (September 30, 2005). How to Spot a Liar: Why People Don't Tell the Truth...and How You Can Catch Them (1st ed.). Career Press. ISBN 1-56414-840-8.
- Karinch, Maryann; David Sherer (September 1, 2003). Dr. David Sherer's Hospital Survival Guide: 100+ Ways to Make Your Hospital Stay Safe and Comfortable (1st ed.). Claren Books. ISBN 0-9723736-0-8.
- Karinch, Maryann; Dean Hohl (June 1, 2003). Rangers Lead the Way: The Army Rangers' Guide to Leading Your Organization Through Chaos (1st ed.). Adams Media. ISBN 1-58062-598-3.
- Karinch, Maryann (December 3, 2001). Diets Designed for Athletes: How to Combine Food, Fluids, and Supplements for Maximum Training and Performance (1st ed.). Human Kinetics. ISBN 0-7360-3834-5.
- Karinch, Maryann; Peter A. Spevak (May 1, 2006). Empowering Underachievers: How to Guide Failing Kids (8-18) to Personal Excellence (2nd ed.). New Horizon Press. ISBN 0-88282-282-9.
- Karinch, Maryann (April 6, 2000). Lessons From the Edge: Extreme Athletes Show You How to Take on High Risk and Succeed (1st ed.). Simon and Schuster. ISBN 0-684-86215-8.
- Karinch, Maryann; Patrick Avon (July 6, 1999). Boot Camp: The Sergeant's Fitness and Nutrition Program (1st ed.). Simon and Schuster. ISBN 0684848996.
- Karinch, Maryann (July 19, 1995). Telemedicine: What the Future Holds When You're Ill (1st ed.). New Horizon. ISBN 0-88282-130-X.
