= Bob Tufts =

American baseball player (1955–2019)

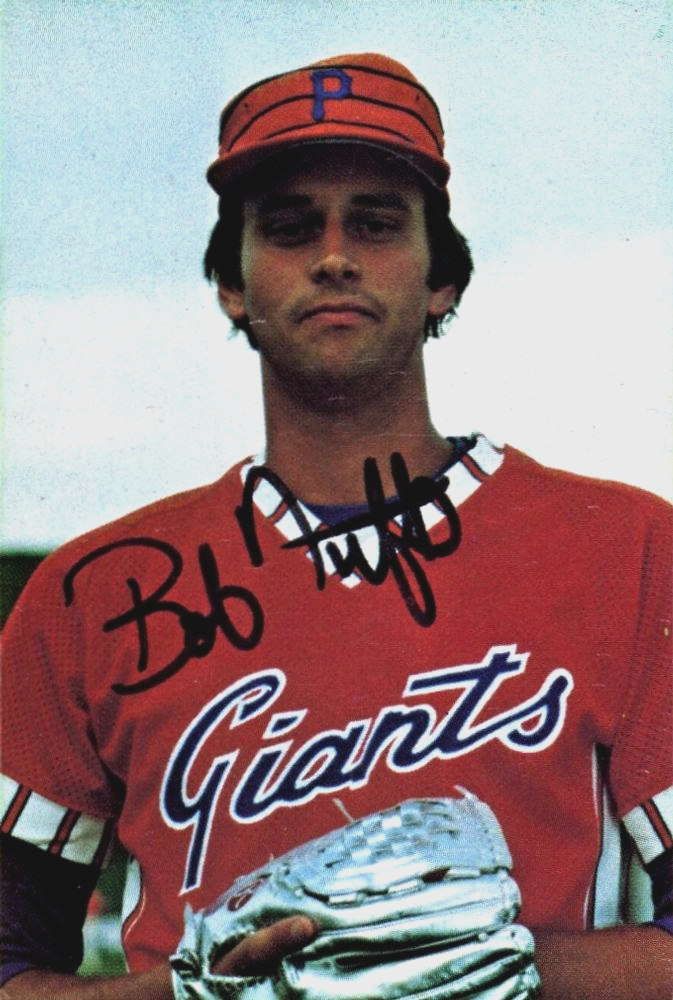
- Tufts with the Phoenix Giants c. 1981
- Pitcher
- Born: November 2, 1955; Medford, Massachusetts, U.S.
- Died: October 4, 2019 (aged 63); New York, New York, U.S.
- Batted: Left Threw: Left

MLB debut
- August 10, 1981, for the San Francisco Giants

Last MLB appearance
- May 6, 1983, for the Kansas City Royals

MLB statistics
- Win–loss record: 2–0
- Earned run average: 4.71
- Strikeouts: 28
- Stats at Baseball Reference

Teams
- San Francisco Giants (1981); Kansas City Royals (1982–1983)

Robert Malcolm Tufts (November 2, 1955 – October 4, 2019) was an American Major League Baseball (MLB) pitcher who played for the San Francisco Giants and Kansas City Royals between 1981 and 1983.

== Early life ==
Tufts was born in Medford, Massachusetts, and raised in Lynnfield, Massachusetts, where he attended Lynnfield High School. He attended Princeton University, where he earned a degree in Economics in 1977. In 1975, he played collegiate summer baseball with the Harwich Mariners of the Cape Cod Baseball League.

== Baseball career ==
Tufts was drafted by the Giants out of Princeton University in the 12th round of the 1977 Major League Baseball draft. In 1979 he led the Texas League in wins and complete games (12) as he was 14-10 with a 2.45 ERA for the Shreveport Captains.

He made his debut for the Giants in 1981, and pitched in 11 games for them that season. He held the distinction of being the last Princeton University baseball player to appear in a major league baseball game until Chris Young debuted with the Rangers on August 24, 2004.

The following spring, Tufts was traded to the Royals along with Vida Blue. During the 1982 and 1983 seasons he appeared in 16 games for the Royals. In 1982 he was 2nd in the American Association in games (59), and 3rd in saves (12), and had a 1.60 ERA, as he pitched for the Omaha Royals. Midseason in 1983, he was traded to the Cincinnati Reds for Charlie Leibrandt, but never appeared in a major league game again.

Tufts converted to Judaism, one of six major league baseball players who converted to Judaism during their careers. He was a participant in a 2005 seminar at the Baseball Hall of Fame in Cooperstown on Jews and Baseball, and also performed baseball clinics in Israel.

== Personal life ==
Tufts earned an MBA degree in finance from Columbia University in 1986. He lived in Forest Hills, New York. He worked in futures and foreign exchange sales and trading, and worked at Bear Stearns, Credit Agricole, Lehman Brothers, Thomson McKinnon, and Jefferies Financial Group.

He was an adjunct professor at New York University, where he taught business development. He also taught sports marketing and management and principles of entrepreneurship as a Visiting Clinical Assistant Professor at the Yeshiva University Sy Syms School of Business and organization behavior in sports at Manhattanville College.

His wife, Suzanne Israel Tufts, served as Assistant Secretary of Administration at the United States Department of Housing and Urban Development (HUD) in 2018. They have a daughter, Abigail Tufts.

In 2009, he was diagnosed with multiple myeloma. He underwent pill-based and liquid chemotherapy and reached a recovery point at which he could undergo and autologous stem cell transplant. As of May 2010, he was in almost complete remission.

Tufts was a patient advocate and founder of My Life Is Worth It. He was an active speaker and frequently tweeted about issues regarding the need to involve patients more in the healthcare process.

Tufts died on October 4, 2019, from an infection brought on by complications from a stem cell transplant on August 23. He was 63. He was buried in Beth Israel Cemetery in Woodbridge Township, New Jersey.

== See also ==
- List of Jews in sports § Baseball
