= 1010 Midtown =

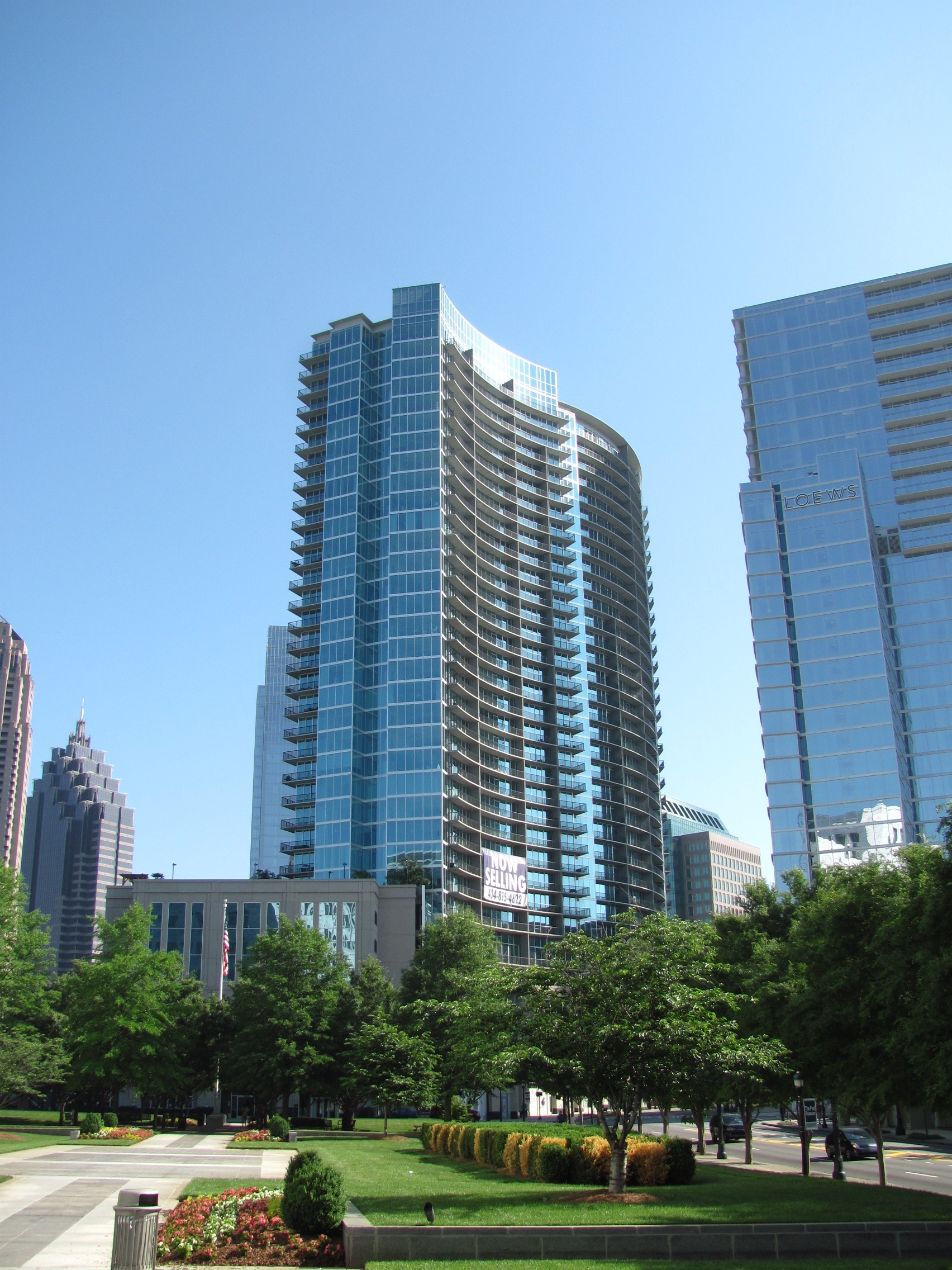
- 1010 Midtown (2010)

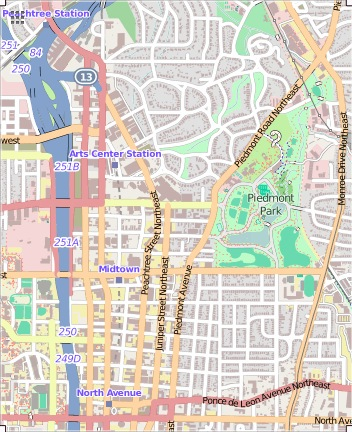
- Location within Atlanta Midtown 1010 Midtown (Atlanta) 1010 Midtown (Georgia) 1010 Midtown (the United States)
- Alternative names: 1010 Peachtree

General information
- Location: 1080 Peachtree Street NE; Atlanta, Georgia
- Coordinates: 33.78376°N 84.38385°W
- Construction started: 2006
- Completed: November 2008

Height
- Roof: 124 m (407 ft)

Technical details
- Floor count: 35
- Lifts/elevators: 6

Design and construction
- Architect: Joy Trammell + Rubio
- Developer: Selig Enterprises, Inc.

Other information
- Number of units: 425

1010 Midtown is a 35-story, 124 m (407 ft) skyscraper in Atlanta, Georgia with 425 condominiums atop 38,000 sq ft (3,500 m^{2}) of retail and dining space. The structure is part of the 12th & Midtown development, situated on approximately 2 acres (0.81 ha) on the block between 11th and 12th streets in Midtown Atlanta, the front of which follows the curve of Peachtree Street. The 1010 Midtown building also features a park-in-the-sky, which will be one of the largest environmentally green rooftops in the city.

Daniel Corporation, Selig Enterprises, the Canyon-Johnson Urban Fund (CJUF), and MetLife combined forces to make 1010 Midtown, a key piece in the Midtown Mile, a reality. The building was designed by the architecture firm Rule Joy Trammell + Rubio and built by Brasfield & Gorrie. Construction of this first phase of the 12th & Midtown development began in August 2006 and was completed in early 2009.

At the base of 1010 Midtown sit several restaurants, including Sugar Factory and Silverlake Ramen. It also houses a Bank of America branch and additional retail space fronting Peachtree Street.

== Incident ==
On March 9, 2012, a man jumped to his death from the 35th floor of the building.

== Midtown Mile ==
1010 Midtown was the first phase to be completed under the "Midtown Mile" master plan, an ambitious retail initiative introduced in 2007 that envisioned 3,000,000 sq ft (280,000 m^{2}) of upscale street-level retail and dining along Peachtree Street. While the sweeping scope of the initiative was later scaled back following the economic downturn, the building successfully anchored the dense, four-block commercial development known as 12th & Midtown.
