= Sylvan Gotshal =

American lawyer

Sylvan H. Gotshal
- Born: March 21, 1897; Memphis, Tennessee, US
- Died: August 11, 1968 (aged 71); Scarsdale, New York, US
- Education: Vanderbilt University (BA); Columbia Law School (LLB)
- Occupation: Lawyer
- Spouse: Violet Kleeman (m. 1918)

Sylvan H. Gotshal (March 21, 1897 – August 11, 1968) was an American lawyer, known for his advocacy of industrial design rights. He was a founding partner of Weil, Gotshal & Manges in 1931.

Born in Memphis, Tennessee, to Leopold and Julia (née Hirschman) Gotshal (initially Gottschall), he attended Vanderbilt University and graduated with a Bachelor of Arts degree in 1917. During World War I, he volunteered to serve in the United States Army but saw no combat action. He then earned a LL.B. from Columbia Law School in 1920, and started practicing at Rose & Paskus in New York City.

Together with Frank Weil and Horace Manges he founded Weil, Gotshal & Manges in 1931, which as of 2022 is the 25th largest law firm in the world by revenue. He also became very active in civic affairs and was, at one time, chairman of the American Arbitration Association and the United Jewish Appeal.

He married Violet Kleeman of Nashville in 1918. They had one daughter, Sue Ann Gotshal, who married John L. Weinberg in 1952.
