= Jill M. Friedman =

American lawyer

Jill M. Friedman is an American lawyer. She is known for her legal work pertaining to the prisoners of Guantanamo Bay. Friedman is a member of the Washington office of Weil, Gotshal & Manges, a law firm that provided free representation for five Saudis detained at Guantanamo Bay. Friedman and Anant Raut wrote "The Saudi Repatriates Report," released in May 2007. The report is a statistical analysis of the cases of 24 repatriated Saudis, a group representing nearly half of the 53 Saudi nationals who had then been released from Guantanamo Bay.

== Works ==
- The Saudi Repatriates Report, March 19, 2007 (with Anant Raut)
