= The Saudi Repatriates Report =

Report on Saudi prisoners of Guantanmo Bay

The Saudi Repatriates Report is a statistics analysis of the cases of 24 repatriated Saudi prisoners released from the Guantanamo Bay naval station since the first planeload of detainees arrived on 11 January 2003. They represent nearly half of the 53 Saudi nationals released from Guantanamo Bay in the period until the publication of the report (19 March 2007). The authors are Anant Raut and Jill M. Friedman, members of the Washington, D.C. office of Weil, Gotshal & Manges law firm. This firm has provided pro-bono representation for five Saudis detained at Guantanamo Bay and provides copies of the supporting documents to the Washington Post.

The report examines the reasons for release of this particular detainees and the timing of their release.
