= Frank Weil =

American lawyer

Frank L. Weil
- Born: March 6, 1894; New York City, US
- Died: November 10, 1957 (aged 63); New York City, US
- Education: Columbia Law School
- Occupation: Lawyer
- Spouse: Henrietta Simons

Frank Leopold Weil (March 6, 1894 – November 10, 1957) was an American lawyer. He was a founding partner of Weil, Gotshal & Manges in 1931.

Born in New York City, Weil attended Columbia Law School, where he became friends with Samuel Irving Rosenman. After graduating with a law degree in 1917, he practiced at Elkus, Gleason & Proskauer. Together with Sylvan Gotshal and Horace Manges, he founded Weil, Gotshal & Manges in 1931, which as of 2016, is one of the largest law firms in the world.

Weil was married to former Henrietta Simons, the granddaughter of Moses Alexander.
