= Steven C. Krane =

American lawyer

Steven C. Krane (January 20, 1957 – June 22, 2010) was an American lawyer who was, at age 44, the youngest president of the New York State Bar Association, and died at the age of 53. He was known as "an expert in legal ethics" and professionalism. His most recent job was that of partner and general counsel at Proskauer Rose.

== Education and career ==
Krane grew up in Far Rockaway, Queens, and graduated from SUNY Stony Brook in 1978, and New York University School of Law in 1981. He was elected to Phi Beta Kappa at SUNY Stony Brook.

He worked most of his legal career at Proskauer Rose, starting as an associate in 1981 and becoming a partner in 1989. He was an expert not only in legal ethics, but in sports law as well.

He also clerked for New York Court of Appeals Judge Judith Kaye from 1984 to 1985. In 2007, he was nominated for a seat on New York's highest court, but then-governor Eliot Spitzer did not appoint him, instead re-appointing Judge Carmen Beauchamp Ciparick to her position.

After serving on both the NYSBA and the American Bar Association houses of delegates, and chair of their ethics committees, Krane was elected the youngest state bar president (at the age of 44) in 2001. His major accomplishments while bar president were the legal response to the September 11 attacks, setting up a program for student loan forgiveness for legal aid and other public service lawyers, and bringing the Model Rules of legal ethics to New York.

Krane served on two statewide commissions: the New York State Commission on Public Integrity, and co-chair of the New York Judicial Institute on Professionalism in the Law.

He also taught at the Columbia Law School as an adjunct professor, from 1989 to 1992.

== Legacy ==
Krane died of a heart attack, at the age of 53, on June 22, 2010.

The New York State Bar Association renamed its fund for young lawyers in public service in honor of Krane.

== See also ==
- List of State University of New York at Stony Brook people
