= Midtown Mile =

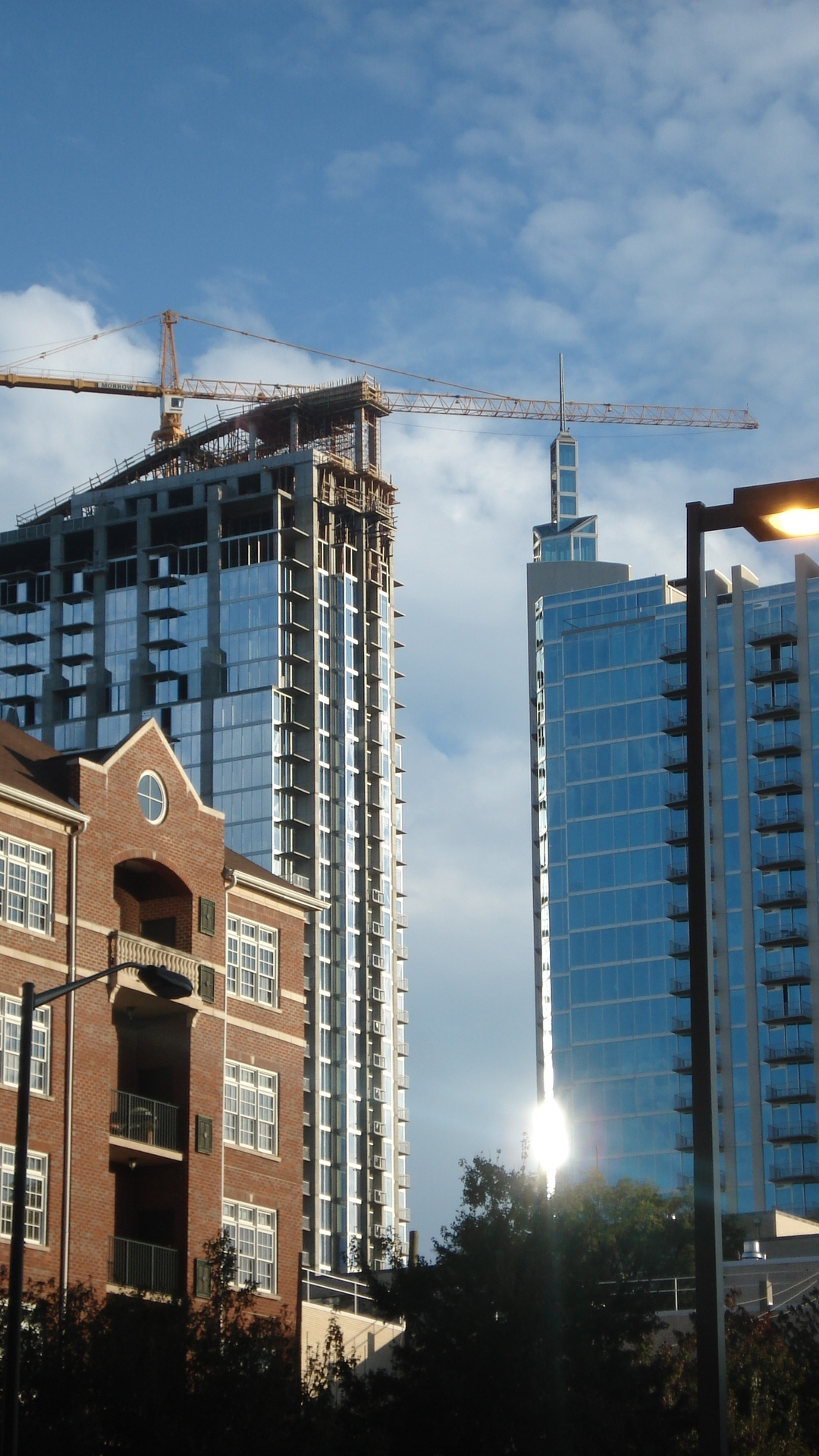
Rapid urbanization along Peachtree Street NE

The Midtown Mile is a section of Peachtree Street in Midtown Atlanta, Georgia, between North Avenue NE and 15th Street NE. Located across the Downtown Connector from Downtown Atlanta, the Midtown Mile is one of the major thoroughfares of central Atlanta in terms of retail and rapid residential development.

== History ==
Although Peachtree Street has long been Atlanta's most famous roadway, the idea of building a dense mixed-use corridor along a stretch of the road in Midtown began in 1997 when a neighborhood group known as the Midtown Alliance published "Blueprint Midtown," a wide-ranging report advocating the need for pedestrian and transport-based development throughout Midtown, focusing specifically on the Peachtree Street Corridor, which has since been nicknamed "Midtown Mile," a pun on Chicago's Magnificent Mile. Such development had been planned for decades - the Midtown Alliance began in 1978 - but only in recent years has the potential for growth been fully realised.

== Retail and landmarks ==
One of the main goals of the Midtown Mile development is to massively expand the retail footprint in central Atlanta. From 2010 through 2013, over 700,000 sq ft (65,032 m^{2}) of retail space is expected to open in addition to existing space, bringing the total amount to over 1,000,000 sq ft (92,903 m^{2}).

=== Skyscrapers ===
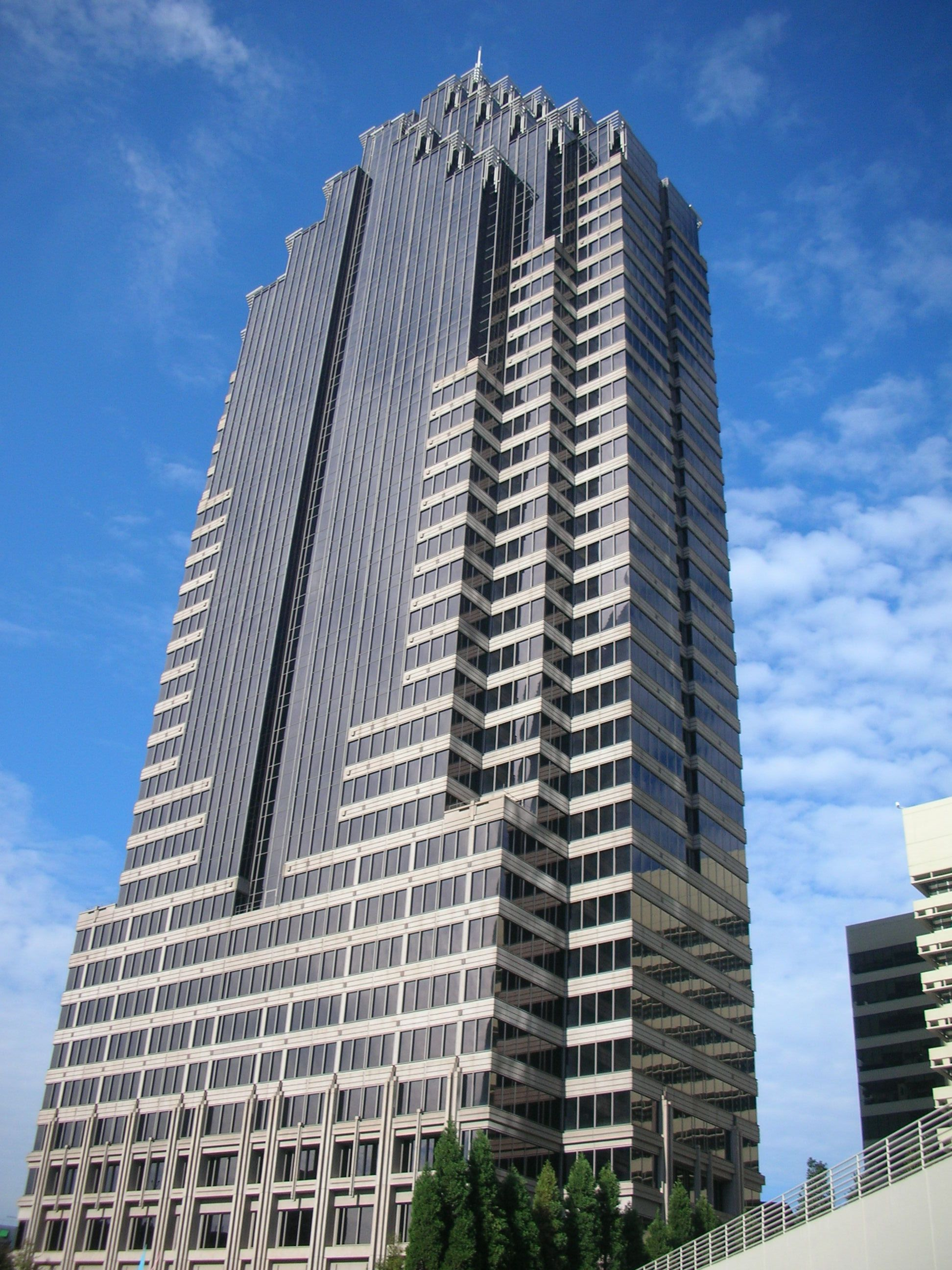
Promenade II.

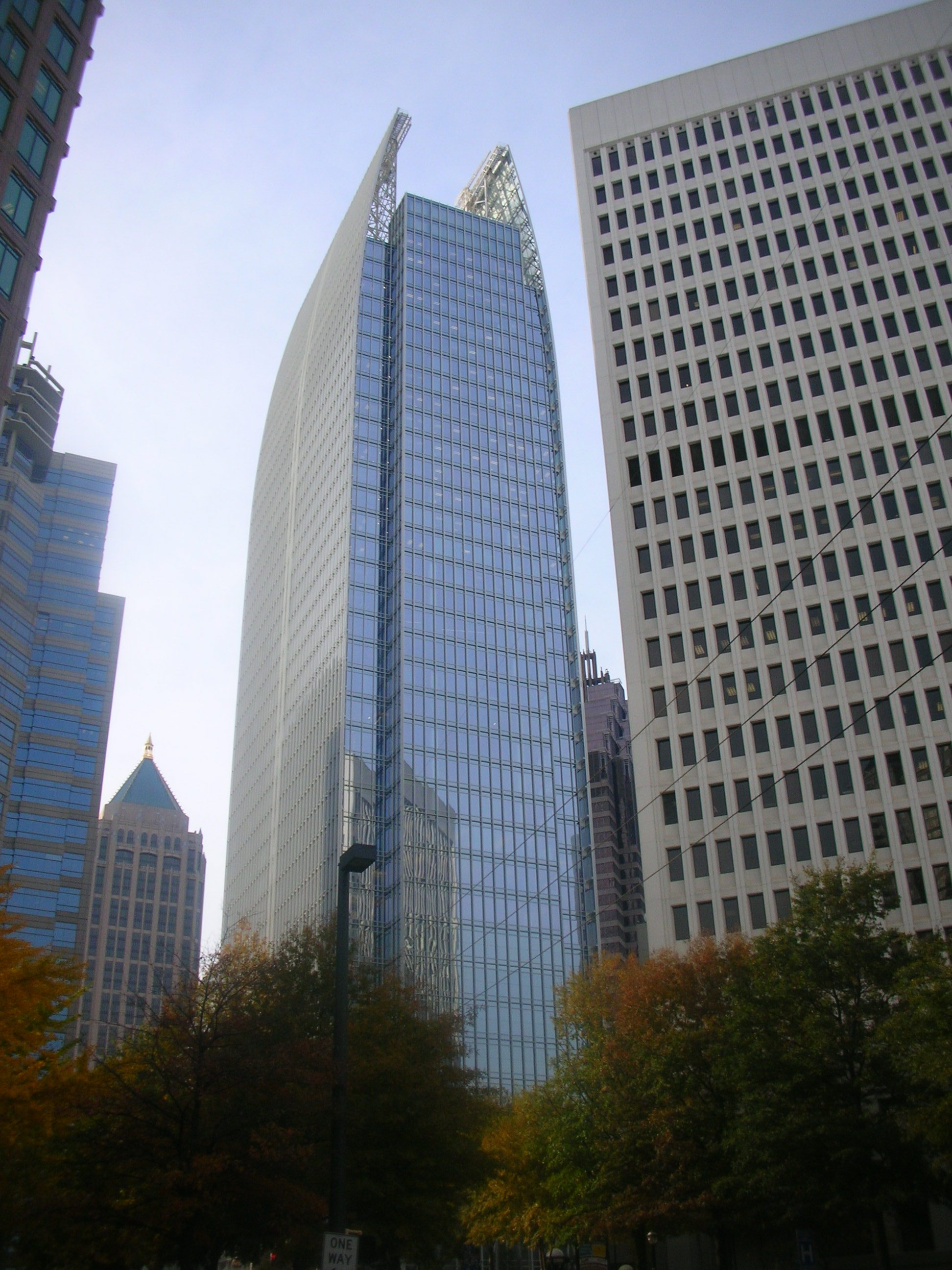
1180 Peachtree, formerly The Symphony Tower.

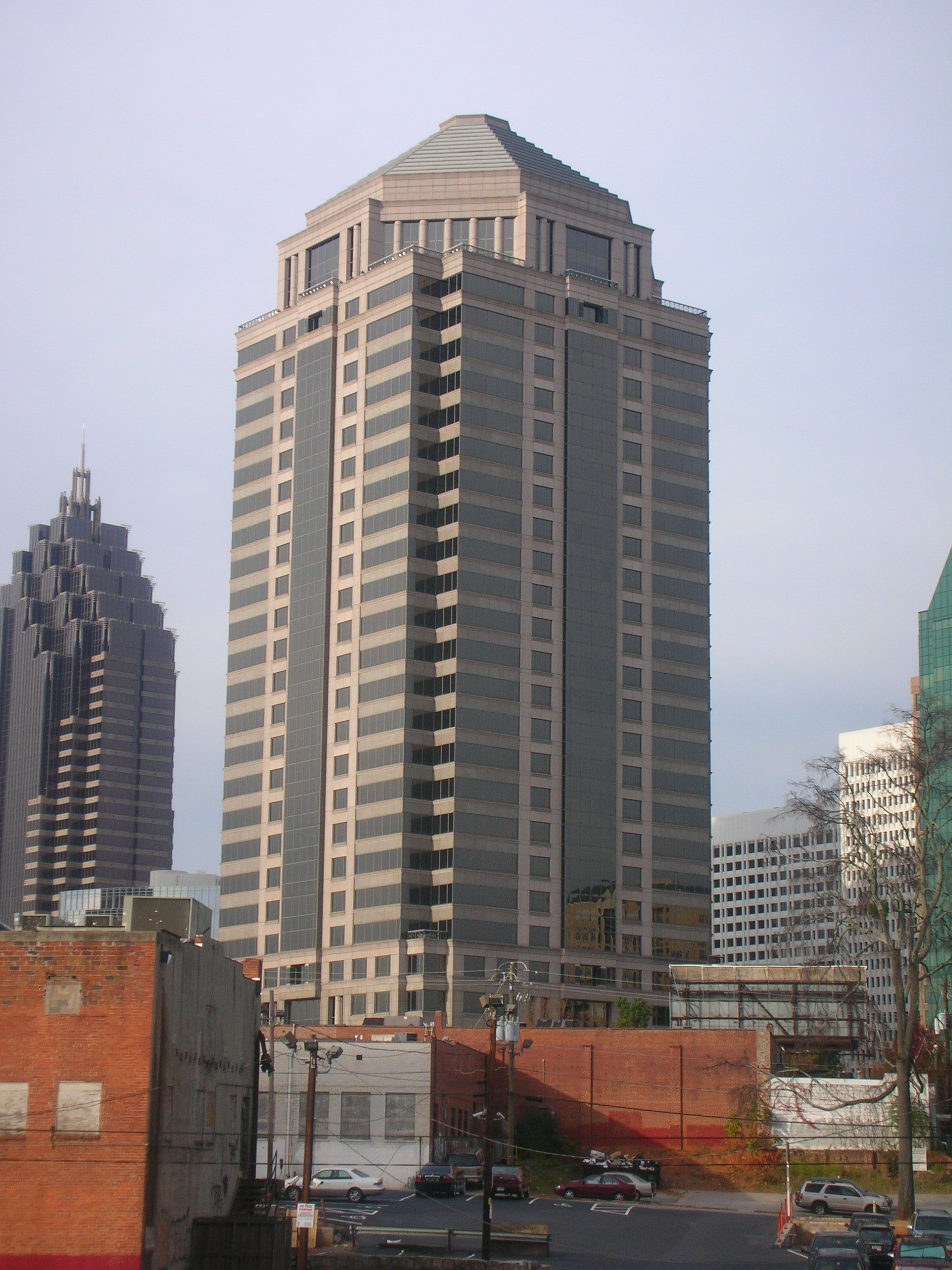
1100 Peachtree.

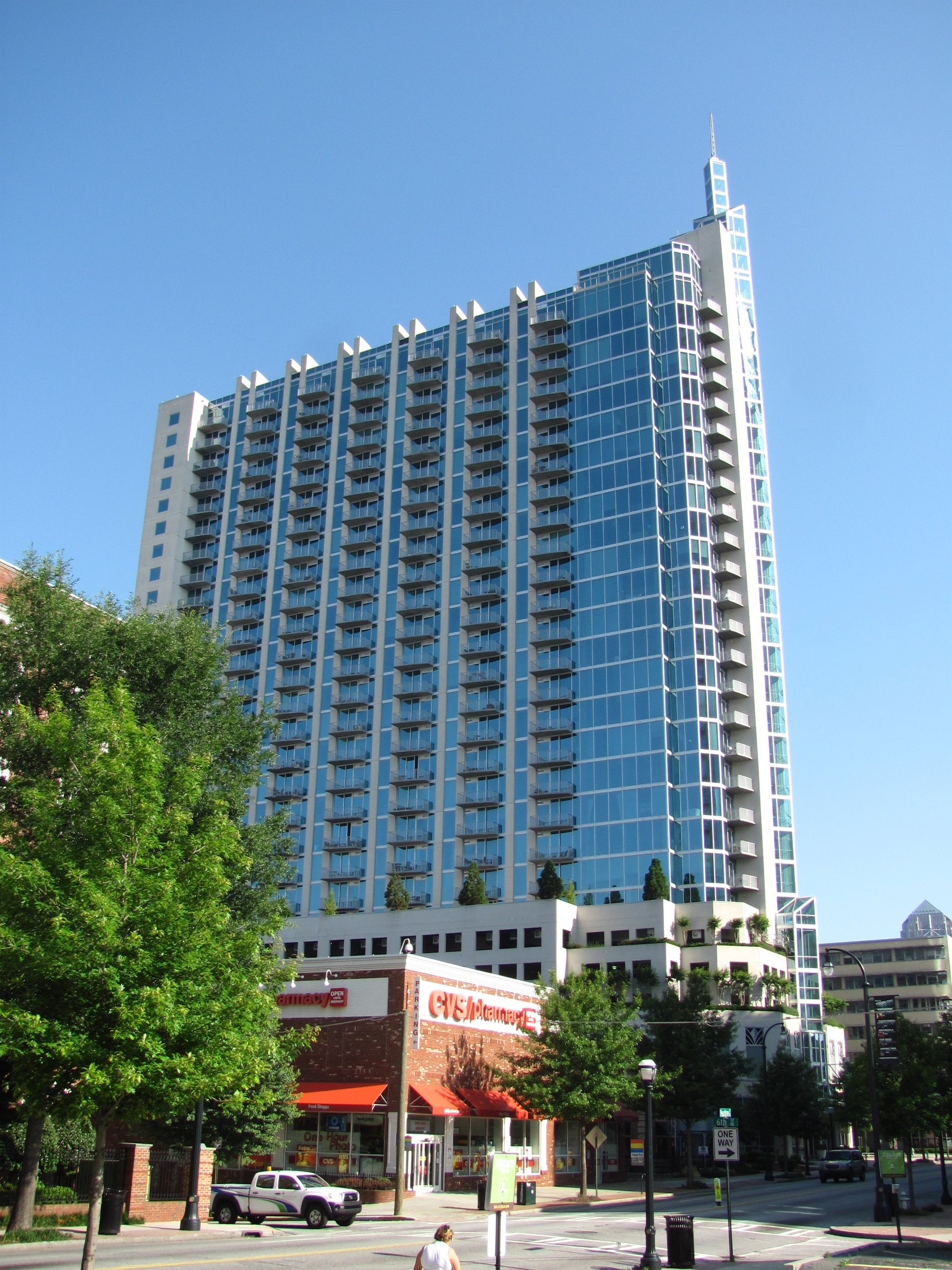
The Atlanta Spire condominium building.

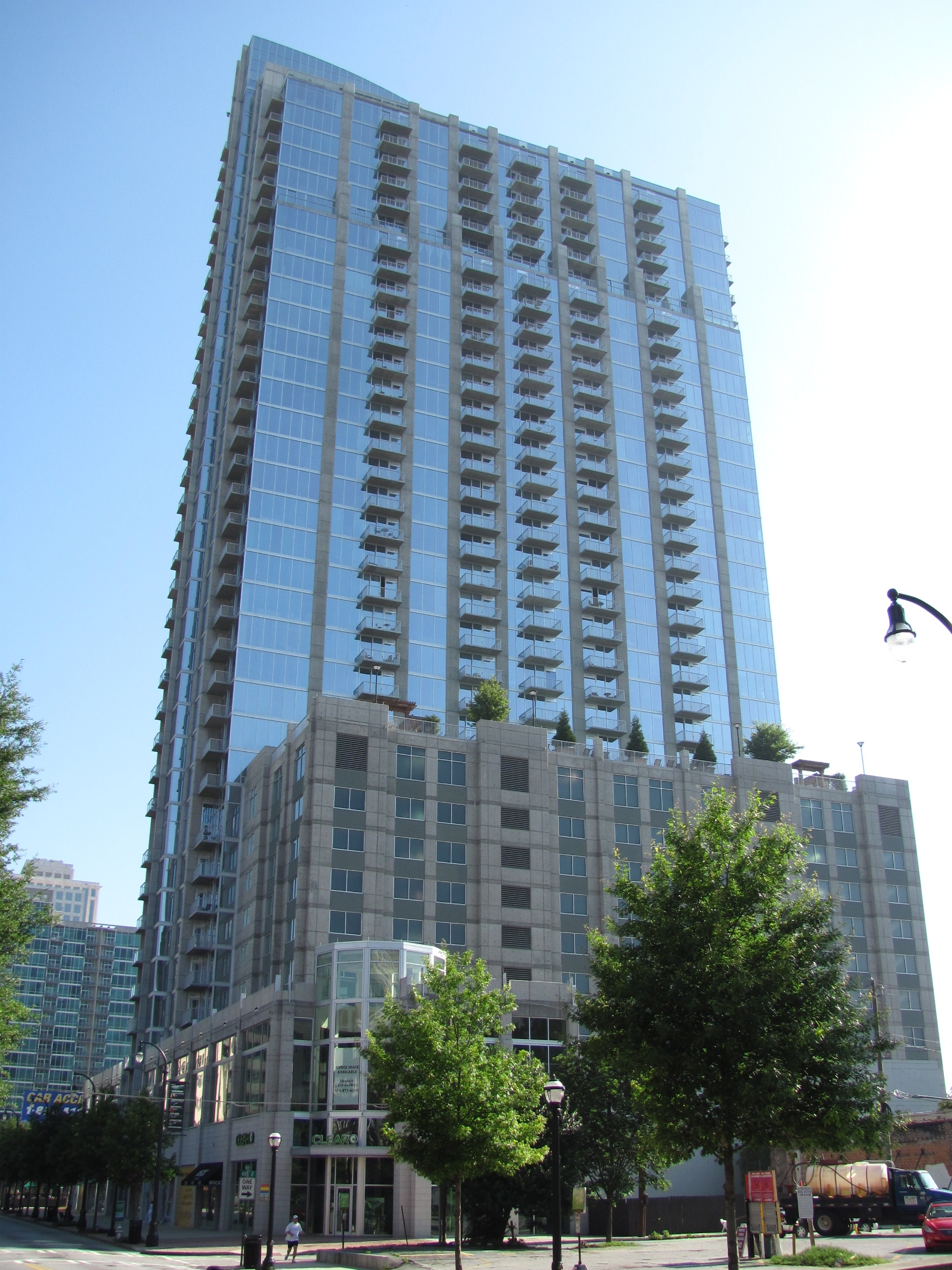
ViewPoint condominiums.

Many of Atlanta's most important and well-known skyscrapers are located along Midtown Mile. These include:

Skyscraper	Address	Cross-street	Opened
Promenade II	1230 Peachtree Street NE	15th Street NE	1990
1180 Peachtree	1180 Peachtree Street NE	14th Street NE	2006
1100 Peachtree	1100 Peachtree Street NE	12th Street NE	2005
Loews Midtown	1075 Peachtree Street NE	12th Street NE	2010
1010 Midtown	1010 Peachtree Street NE	11th Street NE	2008
999 Peachtree	999 Peachtree Street NE	10th Street NE	1987
903 Peachtree	903 Peachtree Street NE	8th Street NE	TBA
Spire	860 Peachtree Street NE	7th Street NE	2005
ViewPoint	855 Peachtree Street NE	7th Street NE	2009

== Transportation ==
=== Road transport ===
Peachtree Street NE is one of the busiest streets in Atlanta. At both ends of Midtown, it connects to the Downtown Connector with the northern entrances corresponding to the end of the concurrency between Interstates 75 and 85; traffic does not immediately head onto Interstate 85 after the split, but rather continues onto Georgia 13, merging onto 85 south of Buckhead.

=== Public transport ===
MARTA has three subway stations in the Midtown area, although none have entrances from or exits onto Peachtree Street itself. From north to south, these are Arts Center, Midtown, and North Avenue. To relieve traffic along Peachtree Street, the Peachtree Corridor Partnership has proposed a 16.5 mi (26.6 km) streetcar running from southern Atlanta through Midtown to Buckhead along Peachtree Street.

== See also ==
- List of tallest buildings in Atlanta
