= Mekka Don =

American rapper

- Born: Chukwuemeka N. Onyejekwe; Columbus, Ohio, United States
- Origin: Columbus, Ohio, United States
- Genres: Hip hop, midwest hip hop
- Label: MDE, LLC
- Website: [www.mekkadonmusic.com]

Chukwuemeka Nnamdi Onyejekwe, also known as Mekka Don, is an American rapper, actor, lawyer, and entrepreneur. In 2012, he was named an "mtvU Freshman" and won "mtvU Best Freshman Video" for his music video "Dirty" in March of the same year. Additionally, he has been featured on MTV, VH1.com, ESPN, Bossip, and several other media outlets. His projects include collaborations with Bizzy Bone, MGK, D.J. Mick Boogie, and The Kickdrums. His decision to leave the legal field for a career as a rapper was profiled in the July 2008 issue of the hip-hop magazine XXL.

== Background and education ==
Mekka Don was born Chukwuemeka ("Emeka") N. Onyejekwe to Okey and Egondu Onyejekwe, Nigerian immigrants, in Columbus, OH. He has 2 older sisters and an older brother, all of whom are practicing professionals. He graduated from St. Francis DeSales High School in Columbus, OH where he was a two-sport star and member of DeSales' State Champion soccer team as a junior and football team as a senior. He was invited to walk on Ohio State University football team where he played wide-receiver and defensive back from 1999–2001.

Following his graduation from Ohio State, Mekka Don attended New York University School of Law, graduating in 2006 and passing the New York State Bar Exam that same year. He worked as an associate attorney at Weil, Gotshal & Manges LLP briefly before leaving to pursue a music career.

== Career and music ==
Mekka Don began rapping and performing as early as 1999 but did not take to rapping professionally until he left his job as a lawyer in 2006. He has been quoted as saying that rapping is his "passion".

He has enjoyed early success with his single "U Know Mekka Don" reaching #2 on the college radio site www.rapattacklives.com surpassing singles from the likes of Lupe Fiasco, The Rza, and other well known artists In 2008 he released a mix-tape with D.J. Mick Boogie entitled "Law and Order." Mekka Don's unusual career path was written up in the July 2008 issue of XXL magazine in a story titled "Keep Pushin'."

Mekka Don has become most notable for the release of an album with DJ Mick Boogie on January 13, 2009 titled The All Eyes On Me EP. The album was written through the eyes of Barack Obama and showcased the difficulties he would face as president of the United States. It received critical acclaim with URB.com calling it "a beautiful stage show." The New York Daily News believes Mekka Don is "bringing change to rap." The Source magazine called the album "Your Inauguration Day Soundtrack."

In January 2012, Mekka Don released a single and video titled "Dirty" which garnered major media attention. As a result of the video release, Mekka Don was named an "mtvU FRESHMAN" by MTV and won "mtvU Best Freshman Video." His video was featured on VH1.com, The Source magazine's website as well as 50 Cent's website, Thisis50.com. Derrick Ward of the Houston Texans made a cameo in "Dirty." Later that year, Mekka Don released another video from a song off of his mixtape ("It's On"), titled "Here We Go." "Here We Go" premiered on MTV.com and VH1.com and the song was put into rotation on Shade45 on Sirius radio.

In August 2012, Mekka Don signed a multi-song licensing agreement with ESPN Networks to use his music during college football broadcasting.

In September 2012, Mekka Don was nominated for two Ohio Hip-Hop Awards (Best Male Artist and Best Mixtape Artist). In December 2012 he followed up with a Dubstep-inspired EP, "Paradise", produced by Ohio producer Tha Audio Unit and hosted by Ohio DJ, DJ-EV.

In February 2013, Mekka Don and Ohio State University co-released a music promo video to his song "Let's Go O-H-I-O" to build hype and anticipation for the upcoming Big Ten tourney and March Madness. Mekka Don signed a multi-song licensing deal with the Big Ten Network for use of his songs in the 2013 Men's basketball tournament coverage.

In fall 2013, Mekka Don released an officially licensed Ohio State University football anthem "Juice" to be played at all of Ohio State's home games.

In early March 2014, Mekka Don released his debut album, The Dream Goes On digitally on iTunes and Amazon to rave reviews from major press including MTV News and The Source magazine. To help fund the production of his album, Mekka Don took to crowdfunding on Indiegogo.com. His goal was to raise $12,500 in 35 days and he ended up raising over $21,000 in that time with over 300 funders.

In fall 2014, Mekka Don and the Cleveland Browns reached a licensing agreement for Mekka Don's Cleveland Browns anthem "Rock For My Browns." The song is played at all of the Cleveland Browns home games.

In May 2015, Mekka Don released a Heisman hype song and video dedicated to Ohio State running back Ezekiel Elliott titled "Zeke".

In October 2017, Mekka Don's single "Real One" was licensed by ESPN First Take as one of the shows songs of the month.

Mekka Don released the single "Nip and Tuck" in April 2018.

In June 2020, Mekka Don was selected to be a member of the Big Ten Anti-Hate and Anti-Racism coalition.

Following a multi-year absence from music due to an injury, Mekka Don returned to the music scene with a splash with an anthem entitled, "Still Dope". The anthem is meant to inspire people to continue pushing on despite all of the turmoil and struggle. The song and video have received national praise from the likes of Chuck D, BNC News and more. AllHipHop.com called the anthem "The Soundtrack of the Times", while viral TV show RightThisMinute called it an, "Inspirational Hit"

In the Summer of 2023, Mekka Don released a hit single and music video on Father's Day entitled, "Carry It On." The song is about legacy and passing the torch to the next generation.

In July 2024, Mekka Don released an Officially Licensed Ohio State anthem entitled "Buckle Up" to great fanfare. The Ohio State football team runs out to the song out of halftime for every home game and Mekka Don and Ohio State's Team Shop Legends released "Buckle Up" merchandise sold in Ohio Stadium (The Horseshoe).
