= Charles Goldstein =

American lawyer (1936–2015)

- Born: Charles Arthur Goldstein; November 20, 1936; Perth Amboy, New Jersey, US
- Died: July 30, 2015 (aged 78); New York City, US
- Education: Columbia College; Harvard Law School
- Occupation: Real estate lawyer
- Children: 2

Charles Arthur Goldstein (November 20, 1936 – July 30, 2015) was an American real estate lawyer. He headed the Commission for Art Recovery, which helped recover $160 million of Nazi plunder and stolen art by the time of his death.

== Biography ==
Goldstein was born on November 20, 1936, in Perth Amboy, New Jersey, to clothing salesman Murray Goldstein and Evelyn Bier. He studied at Columbia College and Harvard Law School, graduating in 1958 and 1961, respectively. He worked as a clerk for the United States Court of Appeals for the Second Circuit.

Goldstein was a board member of Weil, Gotshal & Manges and headed their real estate department in the 1970s and early 1980s. With the law firm, he managed legal work for the projects of the Empire State Development Corporation, including their Hotel Commodore, Portman Hotel, Hotel St. George, and South Street Seaport. He also worked on housing on Roosevelt Island. He lobbied for government involvement in the construction of the Javits Center. He was also an associate of Shea & Gould, moving to Sutherland Asbill & Brennan after their closure.

Golstein was a colleague of Donald Trump, who called him "Sir Charles", saying that "he's a very pompous guy and has a tendency to act like royalty". Though Trump noted his success as a lawyer, the two generally disliked each other. Around this time, he was the personal lawyer of New York Governor Hugh Carey and counseled New York City comptroller Harrison J. Goldin. Goldstein was later an associate of Herrick, Feinstein.

Goldstein was chairman of the Commission for Art Recovery, an organization founded by Ronald Lauder to recover art stolen from victims of The Holocaust. Goldstein was hired to the commission after being introduced to Lauder by a mutual friend of theirs, on a flight from Europe on a Concorde. By 2015, it had helped recover $160 million of stolen art, including Portrait of Adele Bloch-Bauer I (1907) and Femme nue couchée (1862). The recovery of the former inspired the 2015 film Woman in Gold.

Goldstein was Jewish. He married twice, both ending in divorce. He had a daughter and a stepson. He died on July 30, 2015, aged 78, in Manhattan, from an infection. After his death, Lauder called him "the unsung hero of art restitution".
