= Suzanne Israel Tufts =

American lawyer

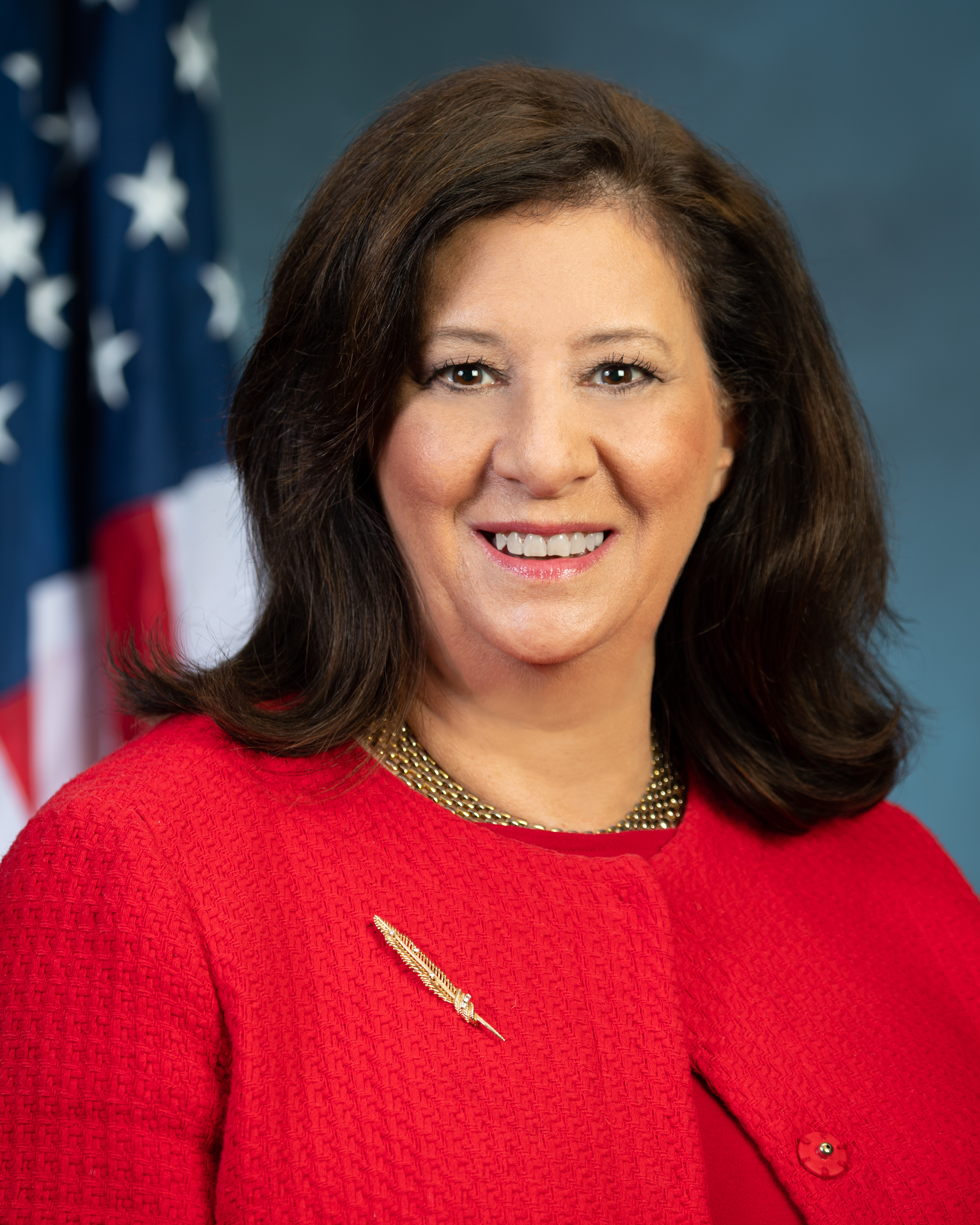

Assistant Secretary of Administration at the United States Department of Housing and Urban Development
- In office January 5, 2018 – October 19, 2018
- President: Donald Trump

Personal details
- Education: Princeton University; University of Virginia School of Law

Suzanne Israel Tufts is an American consultant and attorney. She is a former Assistant Secretary of Administration at the United States Department of Housing and Urban Development (HUD), having resigned in October 2018.

== Career ==
Tufts has practiced law focusing on white collar and governmental investigations, complex commercial litigation, employment and small business advisory with the law firms of Weil, Gotshal and Manges; Paul, Weiss, Rifkind, Wharton & Garrison; and Friedman, Kaplan, Seiler & Adelman. She is the founder of her own consulting firm, which focuses on providing services for tax-exempt organizations and emerging companies. Tufts previously worked as president and CEO of the American Woman's Economic Development Corporation, a women's entrepreneurship training center.

Tufts has worked in the private and public sectors in turnaround management. In the public sector, she served in the Administration of President George H. W. Bush as the Regional Director, Region II of ACTION (now known as the Corporation for National Service), where she improved program outcomes and fiscal oversight, including working to defund fraudulent and non-performing grantees.

Tufts was recognized by President George W. Bush and U.S. Secretary of Labor Elaine Chao for providing emergency small business crisis services within 72 hours of the September 11 attacks.

She was confirmed by the United States Senate on December 21, 2017, to become an Assistant Secretary of Administration at the United States Department of Housing and Urban Development (HUD) after being nominated by President Donald Trump in October 2017. Tufts resigned on October 16, 2018, amid controversy, including reports that she had not been to work for two months and questions surrounding news that she was to be appointed acting Inspector General of the U.S. Department of the Interior. The latter announcement was retracted by the Interior Department, explaining that "HUD sent out an email that had false information in it."

== Education ==
Tufts graduated summa cum laude with an A.B. in bio-medical ethics from Princeton University in 1977, and received her J.D. in 1982 from the University of Virginia School of Law, where she was awarded a Dillard Fellowship in legal writing and research.

== Personal life ==
Tufts lives in New York. Her husband, Bob Tufts, was a Major League Baseball player for the San Francisco Giants and the Kansas City Royals, who taught at the Sy Syms School of Business of Yeshiva University and was the founder of My Life Is Worth It, a patient and innovation advocacy organization; he died on October 4, 2019. She has a daughter, Abigail Tufts.

== See also ==
- Ryan Zinke#Expenditure controversies
