= Jim McCormick (author) =

American writer and skydiver

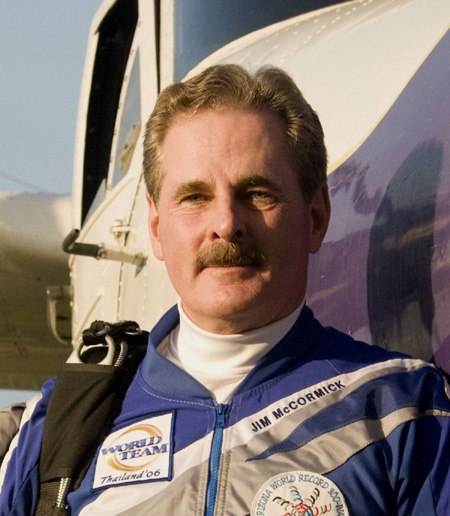
- Jim McCormick
- Born: James Maxwell McCormick; Denver, Colorado, U.S.
- Other name: Jim
- Education: University of Southern California; University of California, Irvine
- Occupations: Author, Speaker, Coach, Consultant, and Professional Skydiver
- Known for: World Record and North Pole Skydiver. Expertise in intelligent risk-taking and innovation.
- Website: [www.risk-institute.com]

James Maxwell McCormick is an American speaker, author, and professional skydiver who is known for his expertise in intelligent risk-taking and innovation. He is the founder of The Research Institute for Risk Intelligence, holds eighteen (18) skydiving world records, and was a member of an international expedition that skydived to the North Pole. He served three years in the Reagan Administration in Washington, DC, before returning to the private sector, where, among other engagements, he served as Chief Operating Officer (COO) at design firm Anshen+Allen Architects.

== Education ==
McCormick attended elementary, intermediate and high schools in Tustin, California. He earned a bachelor's degree in civil engineering with an emphasis in construction management from the Viterbi School at the University of Southern California.

McCormick earned an MBA in finance and marketing from the Merage School of Business at the University of California, Irvine. He was the keynote speaker at the school's commencement activities.

== Career ==
After founding a small, Los Angeles-based trucking company, McCormick moved into real estate finance in Newport Beach, California. He served three years in the Reagan Administration in Washington, DC and then returned to the private sector in southern California. He served as vice president, Construction and Development for the Beckman Laser Institute and Medical Clinic and the University of California, Irvine and was responsible for funding and building the facility. He then returned to real estate finance with Westmont Investment Company as vice president and project partner. He was then recruited to serve as Chief Operating Officer by Anshen+Allen Architects, at the time, the fifth largest architectural firm in the United States. This was the last position he held before becoming a full-time speaker, author, coach, and consultant.

McCormick served in the U.S. Department of Energy during Ronald Reagan's first term. From 1981 to 1984, the positions he held included Special Assistant to the Assistant Secretary for Congressional, Intergovernmental and Public Affairs, Robert Odle, Aide to Secretary James B. Edwards, Staff Assistant to Secretary Donald P. Hodel, Special Assistant to the General Counsel.

Outside of his skydiving activities, McCormick is also known for his work in risk management and leadership consulting. In 2013 he founded the Research Institute for Risk Intelligence, an organization that studies decision-making under uncertainty and provides training and advisory services to corporate and government leaders. His work in this field focuses on helping organizations improve strategic thinking and risk assessment in complex and rapidly changing environments.

== Skydiving ==
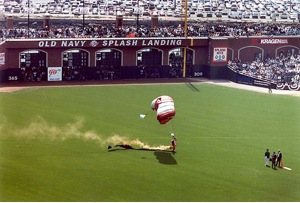
McCormick landing at AT&T Park during the opening ceremonies in April, 2000

McCormick is a Professional Exhibition Skydiver and has jumped into numerous public events, including the inaugural Opening Day at AT&T Park (then named Pacific Bell Park) in San Francisco when he delivered soil gathered from every major league baseball field to the new stadium.

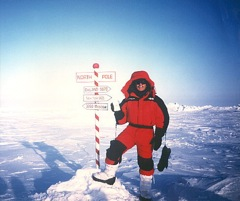
McCormick at the North Pole on April 18, 1995

On April 18, 1995, McCormick landed a parachute at the North Pole, after exiting an Ilyushin Il-76 jet aircraft flown from Khatanga, Siberia.

On July 26, 1998, McCormick was a member of a team that set a world skydiving record above Skydive Chicago, in Ottawa, Illinois. The team built a formation of 246 skydivers that we held for 7.25 seconds. His second skydiving world record was earned on December 12, 2002, as a member of the Arizona Airspeed Skydive Arizona World Record team that build a formation of 300 skydivers.

On April 18, 2004, McCormick was a member of the Z-Team when it set a world record above Zephyrhills, Florida for the largest skydive consisting of two different formations. That record was 121. He was also a member of the American delegation to World Team 2006, the largest multi-national sports team ever assembled to pursue a common goal. On February 8, 2006, World Team skydivers representing thirty-five countries successfully established the current world record by creating the largest skydiving formation ever built in the skies above Udon Thani, Thailand. The record was set when 400 World Team skydiving, exiting five C-130 Hercules military transports flying at 25,000 feet, linked together into a precisely designed formation in the colors and patterns of the Thai flag that existed for only 4.25 seconds.

In March 2007, Z-Team reconvened in Zephyrhills, Florida, in an attempt to break their own world record established three years before. On March 31, they succeeded when 139 skydivers built two different formations on one jump.

In 2008 McCormick was on a skydiving team that was featured in a television commercial for Honda Motors UK, titled "difficult is worth doing", in which the team formed three difficult and intricate formations.

On August 28, 2011, McCormick led a team of 69 skydivers that set a Colorado state record over Longmont for the largest formation. In the culmination of a three-year effort, the team created a snowflake formation.

On July 22 and 24, 2015, McCormick was one of the leaders of the Skydiving Hall of Fame Eagles that did the first large formation skydives over the Experimental Aviation Association's AirVenture 2015 airshow. The team consisted of 108 skydivers plus four freefall videographers from 15 countries. AirVenure is considered "the world's largest and most significant annual aviation events."

McCormick earned his ninth world record on September 29, 2015 as a member of an international team jumping in Perris, California. The team of 202 skydivers completed a jump consisting of two formations. The jump met the criteria of the Fédération Aéronautique Internationale for an aviation world record.

On January 30, McCormick participated in a formation of a Chinese character meaning "blessings from the sky" that included 48 skydivers at Skydive DeLand in Florida. It was commissioned by the Air Sports Federation of China and televised to an estimated billion people around the world as part of Chinese New Year celebrations.

McCormick has also participated in several large-scale formation skydives throughout his career. In 2017, he served as a plane captain during a sequential formation world record event at Skydive Chicago, where a team of 111 skydivers completed a three-point sequential formation, setting a Fédération Aéronautique Internationale (FAI) recognized world record for that category. The event brought together experienced formation skydivers from multiple countries and represented a significant milestone in the development of large-scale sequential skydiving formations.

In 2023, McCormick was inducted into the Hall of Fame of Parachuting, an honor recognizing individuals who have made significant and lasting contributions to the sport of skydiving. The induction took place during the annual reunion of the Pioneers of Sport Parachuting in Felicity, California, an event that celebrates influential figures in the history and development of parachuting. His induction recognized both his achievements as a skydiver and his broader contributions to the parachuting community.

Throughout his skydiving career, McCormick has accumulated more than a dozen world records in large formation skydives. Among these achievements is participation in the Fédération Aéronautique Internationale (FAI) recognized 400-way formation world record, one of the largest skydiving formations ever completed. In addition to his accomplishments in the air, McCormick has also contributed to the broader skydiving community through organizational and leadership roles, including serving as director of development for the International Skydiving Museum & Hall of Fame, where he helped support initiatives preserving the history and heritage of the sport.

== Speaking ==
After returning from the skydiving expedition to the North Pole in 1995, McCormick became a professional speaker. His activities have expanded to include organizational consulting, executive and performance coaching, and writing books and articles. His book, The Power of Risk - How Intelligent Choices Will Make You More Successful was a 2009 finalist in the career category of the Next Generation Indie Book Awards. The First Time Manager was a finalist for the Management Book of the Year awards from the Chartered Management Institute.

== Published works ==
- McCormick, Jim; Loren B. Belker; Gary S. Topchik (January 3, 2012). The First-Time Manager (6th ed.). AMACOM ISBN 978-0814417836.
- McCormick, Jim; Loren B. Belker; Gary S. Topchik (August 14, 2018). The First-Time Manager (7th ed.). HarperCollins Publishing ISBN 9780814439692.
- McCormick, Jim; Maryann Karinch (July 9, 2009). Business Lessons from the Edge - Learn How Extreme Athletes Use Intelligent Risk Taking to Succeed in Business (1st ed.). McGraw Hill. ISBN 978-0-07-162698-9.
- McCormick, Jim (September 19, 2008). The Power of Risk - How Intelligent Choices Will Make You More Successful (1st ed.). Maxwell Press. ISBN 978-0-9728520-0-5.
- Borschel, Don; Gary Copeland; Doug Hanson; Mike Hourigan; Jim Jacobus; Jack Jobe; Jim McCormick; Colleen Stanley; Vilis Ozols; Vickie Sullivan; Jeff Staads; Ed Tate (January 2004). Motivational Selling - Advice on Selling Effectively, Staying Motivated and Being a Peak Sales Producer (1st ed.). Ozoles Business Group. ISBN 0-9679329-1-2.
- McCormick, Jim (July 20, 2009). 365 Daily Doses of Courage: Inspiration to Help You Take Leaps in Your Life (2nd ed.). Maxwell Press. ISBN 978-0-9728520-8-1.
- McCormick, Jim (January 1, 2022). The Power of Risk: How Intelligent Choices Will Make You More Successful (2nd ed.). Armin Lear Press. ISBN 978-1735617411.
