= Tim Prentice (sculptor) =

American sculptor (1930–2025)

- Born: November 5, 1930
- Died: November 25, 2025 (aged 95)
- Education: Yale School of Architecture
- Known for: Sculpture
- Movement: Kinetic art
- Awards: 2014 Governor's Arts Award, Connecticut, 2009 Transfield Kinetic Artist Prize, Sculpture by the Sea, Sydney, Australia
- Website: timprentice.com

Tim Prentice (November 5, 1930 – November 25, 2025) was an American kinetic sculptor and architect. He received a master's degree in architecture from the Yale School of Architecture in 1960 and founded the award-winning company of Prentice & Chan in 1965. He resided in Cornwall, Connecticut.

Ten years after forming Prentice & Chan, he established his studio in Cornwall to design and fabricate kinetic sculpture. His corporate clients included American Express, Bank of America, Citigroup, Mobil, AT&T and Hewlett-Packard. He has completed installations in Japan, Korea, Northern Ireland, and Australia. The lobby of Eleven Times Square features one of his kinetic mobile installations. One of his notable works include "Flashdance", at the Jacksonville International Airport, containing suspended kinetic elements that move in response to air currents generated by a moving escalator.

His work was influenced by Alexander Calder and George Rickey, but the critic Grace Glueck stated that his work's 'gently assertive character is very much his own.' His works were on display at the Maxwell Davidson Gallery in New York City in 2000.

In his later years, Prentice experienced macular degeneration and vision loss, which he reported to not have impacted his artistic career. Prentice died on November 25, 2025, at the age of 95.

== Book ==
- Drawing on the Air: The Kinetic Sculpture of Tim Prentice, (2012) Easton Studio Press

== Public collections ==
- Westmoreland Museum of American Art

== Residencies and workshops ==
- 1991: Hotchkiss School, Lakeville, Connecticut
- 1993: Groton School, Groton, Massachusetts
- 2004: Pratt Museum, Homer, Alaska

== Professional roles and memberships ==
- 1949 Graduate of Brooks School, North Andover, MA
- 1953-1960 Yale University, B.A., M. Arch
- 1965-1975 Partner, Prentice & Chan Architects, New York, NY
- 1968-1969 Member of MOMA Commission on Architecture and Design
- 1973-1974 President, New York Chapter of the AIA
- 1974-1976 President, Municipal Art Society, New York, NY
- 1975-1989 Fellow, American Institute of Architects
- 1975-1980 Adjunct Professor of Design, Columbia University, New York, NY
- 1992-1995 Member, Board of Trustees, Saint-Gaudens Trust
- 1995-1998 Member, Board of Trustees, Hartford Art School
