= Margaret Richardson (lawyer) =

American lawyer (1943–2021)

Peggy Richardson

Commissioner of Internal Revenue
- In office May 27, 1993 – May 31, 1997
- President: Bill Clinton
- Preceded by: Michael Dolan (Acting)
- Succeeded by: Michael Dolan (Acting)

Personal details
- Born: Mary Margaret Milner; May 14, 1943 Waco, Texas, U.S.
- Died: July 13, 2021 (aged 78) Delaplane, Virginia, U.S.
- Spouse: John Richardson (m. 1967)
- Children: 1
- Education: Vassar College (AB); George Washington University (JD)

Mary Margaret Richardson (née Milner; May 14, 1943 – July 13, 2021) was an American tax lawyer. She served as Commissioner of Internal Revenue at the Internal Revenue Service (IRS) from 1993 to 1997. She was the second woman to hold the position, after her immediate predecessor, Shirley D. Peterson.

== Early life ==
Richardson was born in Waco, Texas, on May 14, 1943. Her father was a colonel in the US Army; her mother worked as an English teacher. Richardson was raised in Waco and West Point, New York. She studied political science at Vassar College, graduating with a bachelor's degree in 1965. She then attended the George Washington University Law School, where she was one of the editors of The George Washington Law Review, and obtained a Juris Doctor in 1968. She went on to clerk for the US Court of Claims.

== Early career ==
Richardson first worked at the Office of Chief Counsel of the IRS for eight years. She eventually rose to the position of director of the administrative services division, becoming the first woman promoted to executive rank in that office's history. She subsequently joined Sutherland, Asbill and Brennan, a law firm in Washington D.C., in 1977. She became a partner three years later and worked there until her appointment to the IRS in 1993. Richardson became friends with Hillary Clinton while they were both members of the American Bar Association. She helped fundraise for her husband, Bill Clinton, during his 1992 presidential campaign.

== Commissioner of the internal revenue service ==
Upon becoming president in 1993, he appointed Richardson as Commissioner of Internal Revenue. She was the second woman to serve in the post, after her immediate predecessor, Shirley D. Peterson. She was also the second partner from Sutherland, Asbill to be appointed to the role, after Randolph W. Thrower from 1969 to 1971. During her tenure, Richardson attempted to bring the agency's technology – some of which was built in the 1960s – up to date. However, she was unable to make significant headway and this undermined confidence in her administration. She was also appointed to the IRS Commissioner's Advisory Group, serving as a member from 1988 to 1990 and as chair from 1989 to 1990.

== Post commissioner of IRS ==
Following her service as IRS Commissioner concluded in 1997, Richardson became a member of Ernst & Young, in Washington, D.C. later that year until June 2003. She subsequently served on the boards of Jackson Hewitt Tax Service, Inc., Legg Mason, and WETA.

Richardson was a member of the District of Columbia and Virginia bars and a fellow of the American Bar Foundation. She co-authored several editions of The Ernst & Young Tax Saver's Guide.

== Personal life ==
Richardson married John L. Richardson in 1967. He worked as a transportation lawyer, and they remained married until her death. Together, they had one child, who was also named Margaret. Richardson served as vice chair of Washington National Cathedral.

Richardson died on July 13, 2021, at her home in Delaplane, Virginia. She was 78, and suffered from lung cancer prior to her death.

Government offices
Preceded by Michael P. Dolan; Acting	Commissioner of Internal Revenue; May 27, 1993 – May 31, 1997	Succeeded by Michael P. Dolan; Acting
