= Doug Perlman =

American businessperson

- Born: Douglas Perlman; October 8, 1968; Baltimore, Maryland, U.S.
- Education: Duke University (BA); University of Virginia School of Law (JD)
- Occupation: Sports Media Executive
- Known for: Founder and CEO, Sports Media Advisors

Doug Perlman is a sports media executive, lawyer and the founder and CEO of Sports Media Advisors. Prior to founding SMA, Perlman held senior positions at the National Hockey League (NHL) and at the sports marketing agency, IMG, where he served as president of IMG Media, N.A. At SMA, Perlman advises sports properties on their media rights, works with institutional investors making sports-related investments, and provides companies with strategic guidance in the sports media space.

== Business career ==
=== Proskauer Rose ===
Perlman began his professional career as an attorney at Proskauer Rose, a global law firm widely regarded as having the nation's top sports practice. While at Proskauer, he worked on numerous matters in sports and entertainment, including legal issues for the NHL.

=== NHL ===
In 1995, while still at Proskauer Rose, Perlman was approached to join the legal department at the NHL, which had been a client. He soon transitioned into a business strategy role, helping to establish the NHL's digital operations. This included managing the partnership between the NHL and IBM to build out the league's digital media presence. As NHL executive vice-president media, Perlman was in charge of the NHL's media business. He led the creation of the NHL Network, while overseeing national and local media rights deals. He played a lead role in helping the NHL emerge from the 2004-05 lockout, helping the league secure media rights deals with OLN (then owned by Comcast) and NBC. During his time at the NHL, he became a member of commissioner Gary Bettman’s senior leadership team and gained recognition for his skills as a negotiator. The Sports Business Journal wrote that Perlman, at 32, found “himself with more responsibility than anyone else his age at a major league sport and perhaps in the entire sports world.”

=== IMG ===
Following the NHL, Perlman was recruited by then-CEO Ted Forstmann to join IMG as the president of IMG Media, North America where he again oversaw all television and digital media businesses, reporting to Forstmann as a member of IMG's six-member global leadership team. While at IMG, Perlman spearheaded Wimbledon's 2007 media deals with NBC, ESPN, and Tennis Channel.

=== Sports Media Advisors ===
Perlman founded Sports Media Advisors in 2009. SMA helps sports properties develop and execute content distribution strategies. This includes negotiating primary media rights deals. Clients have included the NFL, NASCAR, the USTA, Breeders’ Cup, U.S. Soccer, LPGA,MLB, Ryder Cup, Little League Baseball and Division I collegiate athletic departments. Perlman and SMA have negotiated tens of billions of dollars in television and digital media rights fees for major sports properties.

Perlman and SMA also assist private equity groups and other investors who are considering media, technology, and/or sports-related opportunities and advise other businesses, such as Twitter, EA, NextVR, Next League and Cirque du Soleil, helping them navigate the sports media landscape.

=== Other activities ===
Perlman serves as a strategic advisor to the Goal Acquisition SPAC, led by sports agent and investor David Falk and sports business executive Harvey Schiller. Perlman is also an advisor to Next League and previously served on the board of NextVR, which was later purchased by Apple.

=== Recognition ===
Perlman was named to the Sports Business Journal's Forty Under 40 list three times and is a member of the Forty under 40 “Hall of Fame.” He was also named one of the 100 Most Powerful People in Sports by Sporting News.

== Early life and education ==
Perlman was born in Baltimore, Maryland and attended Staples High School in Westport, Connecticut. He is a graduate of Duke University where he received a B.A., cum laude in Political Science in 1990, and of the University of Virginia School of Law where he received his J.D. in 1993.
