= Jason Boyarski =

American lawyer

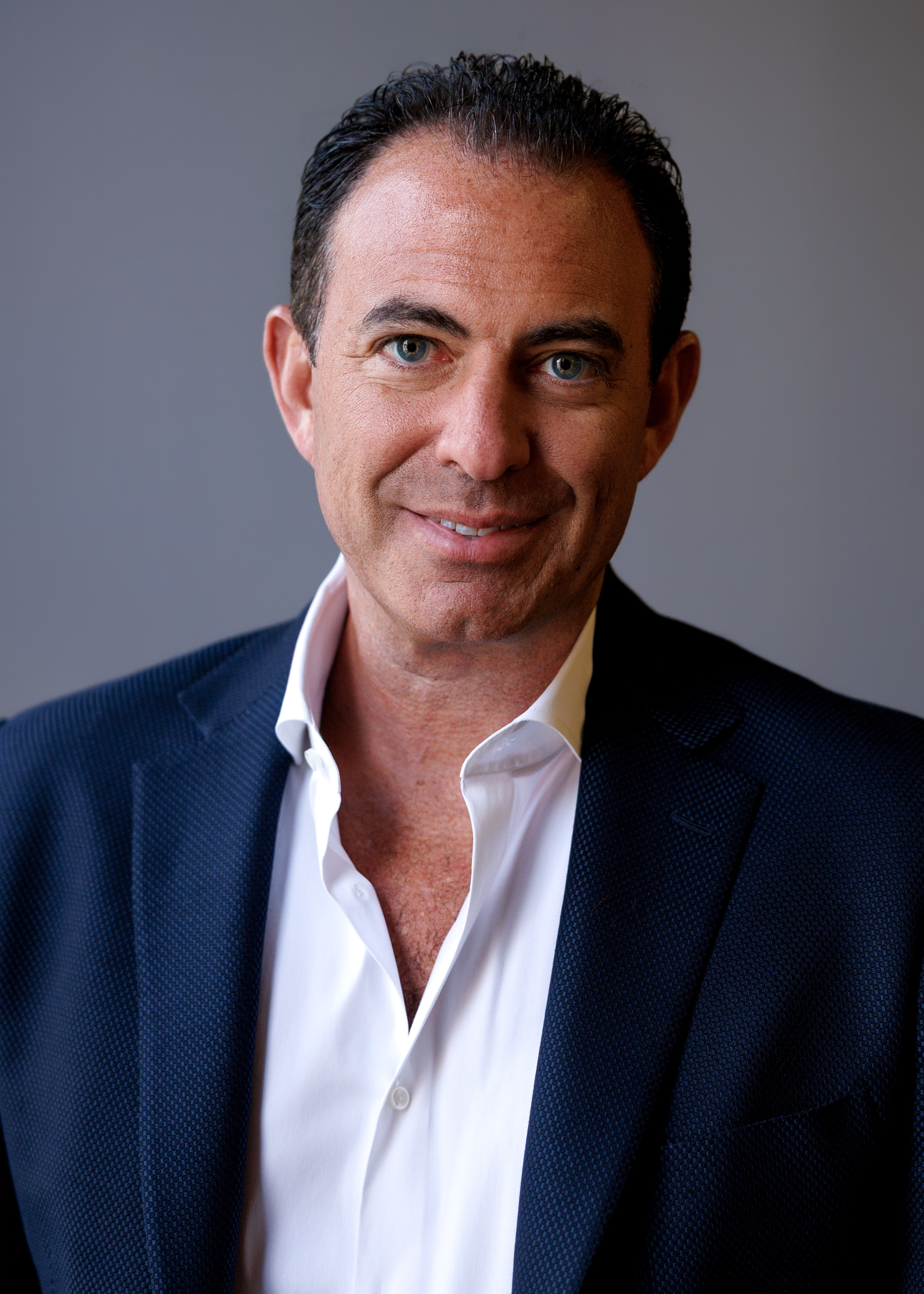
- Born: Jason Ryan Boyarski; 1974 (age 51–52)
- Education: Emory University, Benjamin N. Cardozo School of Law
- Occupation: Entertainment attorney
- Spouse: Robin Alissa Boyarski (2002-present)
- Children: Jordan Boyarski, Alex Boyarski
- Website: www.boyarskifritz.com

Jason Ryan Boyarski (born 1974) is an American entertainment attorney specializing in the music industry. He is a partner in the New York-based law firm Boyarski Fritz LLP, which he co-founded with entertainment attorney David Fritz. Boyarski is known for representing the estate of Prince.

== Education and early career ==
Jason Ryan Boyarski was born in 1974 to New York city natives, Ellie and Joel Boyarski. He began attending Emory University in Atlanta in 1992. He was a student representative and worked as an intern at Sony Music Entertainment's Atlanta office. Boyarski graduated from Emory in 1996 with a Bachelor of Business Administration. Boyarski then began employment at NBC where he worked as a production assistant for Today Show. Shortly thereafter, Boyarski joined Sony Music's 550 Music label where he worked in the Promotions Department on projects including artists Celine Dion, Ben Folds Five, and Ginuwine.

Boyarski began attending Benjamin N. Cardozo School of Law in New York in 1997, graduating in 2000 with a focus on intellectual property law. Boyarski was the Administrative Editor of the Cardozo Law Review where he published a law review note "The Heist of Feist: Protection for Collections of Information and the Possible Federalization of 'Hot News'". During law school, Boyarski worked as a law clerk at Epstein, Levinsohn, Bodine, Hurwitz & Weinstein, LLP and also as a summer associate for Weil, Gotshal & Manges.

== Career ==
Boyarski was employed at Weil, Gotshal & Manges as an Associate in the Trade Practices & Regulatory Law Department. He left in 2002 and began working at BMG Music Publishing in New York as an associate director for legal and business affairs. Between 2002 and 2006, Boyarski was promoted to senior director for legal and business affairs by BMG Music Publishing before being promoted to vice president for legal and business affairs in 2006.

Following UMG's acquisition of BMG in late 2006, Boyarski remained as the vice president for legal and business affairs for Universal Music Publishing Group until 2008 when he was hired by Warner/Chappell Music as Senior Vice President and GM. In 2008, Boyarski also co-founded the marketing agency HeadOverHeels Collective. Boyarski left Warner/Chappell in 2011, soon co-founding the New York-based law firm Boyarski Fritz LLP with entertainment attorney David Fritz in November 2011. The firm specializes in deal-making and transactions.

For the estate of Earth Wind & Fire's Maurice White, Boyarski negotiated the 2026 documentary Earth, Wind & Fire (To Be Celestial vs That's the Weight of the World). Boyarski's client roster has also included Donny Hathaway, the estate of Frankie Beverly, and Brazilian artist Antonio Carlos Jobim who wrote "The Girl From Ipanema" and who received a new publishing agreement spanning his entire catalog.

Boyarski has represented recording artists Joan Jett, Lil' Kim, Marc Anthony, Fetty Wap and Bebe Rexha. He represented Jisoo from Blackpink with respect to her solo project for Warner Music and Disney star Hudson Stone for Stone's 2026 recording contract with Hollywood Records. His client roster has also included Kylie Jenner, Tiffany Stringer, Producer of the Year and GRAMMY winner Cirkut, JVKE, Thalia, Meek Mill, LMFAO's Redfoo, Dean Lewis, Kevin Rudolf, EDM stars Aluna and Paul Oakenfold, and producer/songwriters Louis Bell, Tainy, and Hit-Boy, all of whose catalog sales Boyarski and his firm negotiated.

Boyarski has also represented BMG, Disney Music, AEG, Facebook, ASICS, Alice + Olivia and Hyatt Hotels, as well as Electric Feel Music, NEON16 & NTERTAIN, Audio Up, and Create Music Group.

=== Representation of Prince's estate ===
After musician Prince died, Boyarski was hired by the bank and Special Administrator of Prince's estate, Bemer Trust, to help negotiate a deal with Universal Music Publishing Group for the rights to Prince's music publishing catalog. Boyarski finalized a deal with Universal Music Publishing Group in October 2016 which was valued at thirty million dollars. Prince had withdrawn from the American Society of Composers, Authors and Publishers in 2014, which left his catalog without any performance rights society. In January 2017, Boyarski reached an agreement with Irving Azoff's Global Music Rights for performance-rights. In the same month, a Minnesotan judge ruled that Comerica Bank would begin overseeing Prince's estate and under Comerica, Boyarski began to focus on Prince's other intellectual property rights and became the overall entertainment attorney for the estate. He brokered a deal in June 2018 with Sony Music that made 23 catalog albums available on streaming services. In 2020, Boyarski negotiated a deal with SiriusXM to create a limited-time channel devoted exclusively to Prince's music.

== Awards and honors ==
Boyarski was named one of America's Top Lawyers by Forbes in 2024 and 2025, one of the magazine's "Best-in-State Lawyers" for 2025, and one of Billboard's Top Music Lawyers every year from 2018 through 2026. He was named a "Power Lawyer" and one of Music's Top 15 Dealmakers by The Hollywood Reporter, a Top Entertainment or Music Attorney by Variety multiple times, and a top lawyer by Super Lawyers magazine. Boyarski's law firm has been named multiple times by Hits as one of "Music's Hottest Law Firms" and was profiled by Hits in 2025. Billboard published a story highlighting Boyarski's career and commemorating the firm's 10th Anniversary in 2021. Forbes also listed Boyarski as one of seven key alumni from Emory University.

== Personal life ==
Boyarski married Robin Alissa Katz at the Essex House in New York City in 2002. He lives in Brookville, New York and has two children.
