= Eleven Times Square =

Commercial skyscraper in Manhattan, New York

11 Times Square
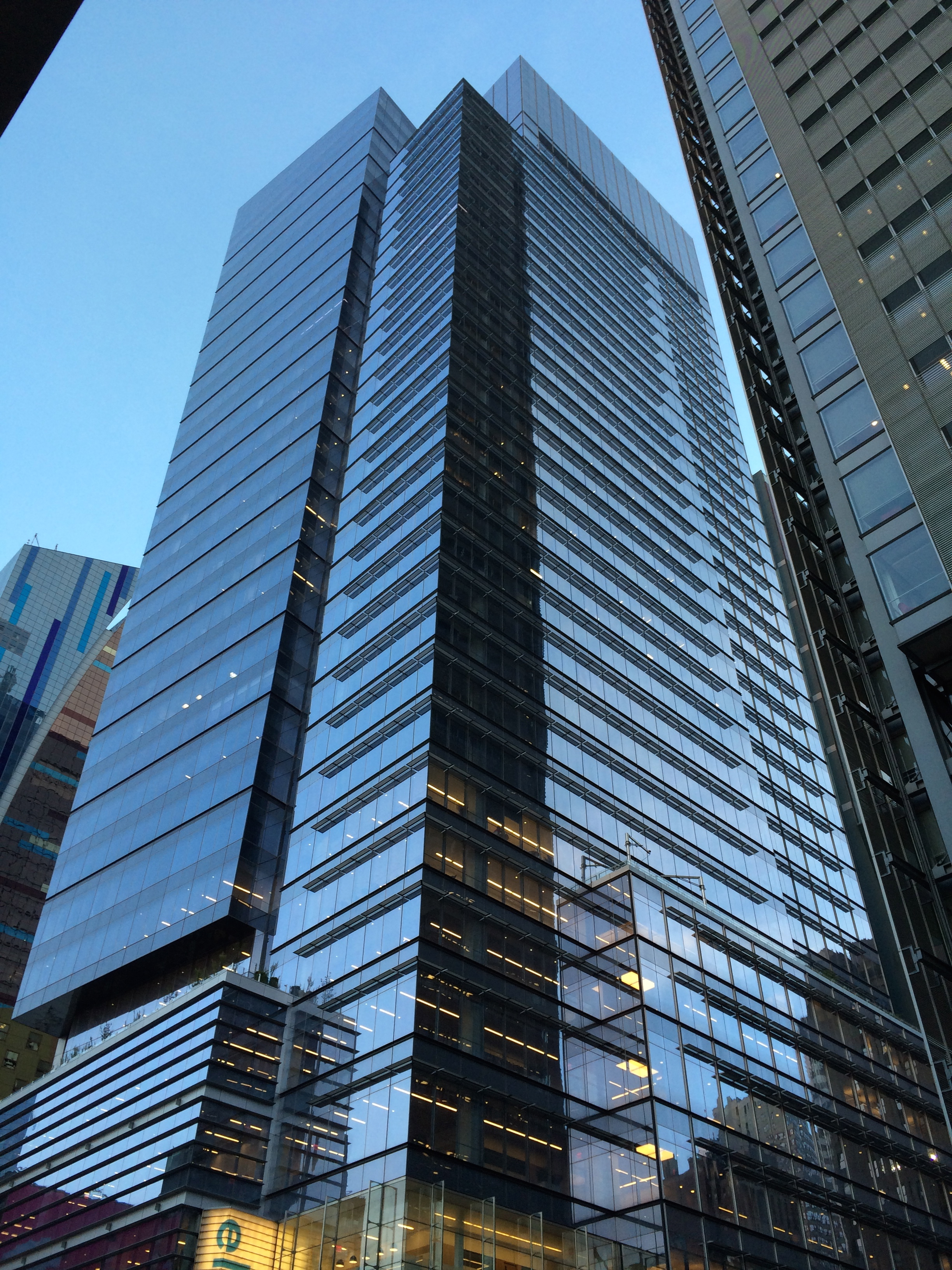
- Seen from the corner of W. 41st Street and Eighth Avenue
- Interactive map of the 11 Times Square area

General information
- Status: Completed
- Type: Commercial
- Location: Southeast corner of Eighth Avenue and W. 42nd Street, New York, NY 10036, 640 8th Ave, New York, NY 10036
- Coordinates: 40°45′24″N 73°59′23″W
- Construction started: 2006
- Completed: 2010
- Opening: 2011
- Cost: $950 million

Height
- Antenna spire: 601 ft (183 m) (architectural)
- Top floor: 530 ft (160 m)

Technical details
- Floor count: 40
- Floor area: 973,187 sq ft (90,412.0 m^{2})
- Lifts/elevators: 20

Design and construction
- Architect: Dan Kaplan (FXFOWLE)
- Developer: SJP Properties
- Structural engineer: Thornton Tomasetti; Cosentini Associates
- Main contractor: Plaza Construction

Eleven Times Square is an office and retail tower located at 640 Eighth Avenue, at the intersection with West 42nd Street, in the Times Square and West Midtown neighborhoods of Manhattan, New York City. The 40-story, 1,100,000-square-foot (102,193 m^{2}) tower rises 601 feet (183 m), making it the 131st tallest building in New York City. The structure is directly east of the Port Authority Bus Terminal and immediately north of The New York Times Building.

Completed in 2011, Eleven Times Square was developed by New York City-based SJP Properties in partnership with Prudential Real Estate Investors, and was designed by architect Dan Kaplan of FXFOWLE.

== Architecture ==
11 Times Square has been certified by the Leadership in Energy and Environmental Design as an environmentally friendly building. It features a high-tech elevator dispatch system; a visitor check-in system; a loading dock; and a messenger/mail center and delivery area specifically designed to maximize ease of use by tenants. The building also provides LEED Platinum-level indoor air quality and office space with floor-to-ceiling windows and column-free corner offices, as well as multiple private terraces. 11 Times Square's lobby features a kinetic mobile installation designed by artist Tim Prentice.

The Port Authority Bus Terminal is directly across Eighth Avenue to the west. In addition, it has direct access to the New York City Subway, with an entrance to the Times Square–42nd Street and 42nd Street–Port Authority Bus Terminal stations (1, 2, 3, 7, <7>, A, C, E, N, Q, R, W, and S trains) inside the lot line.

== History ==
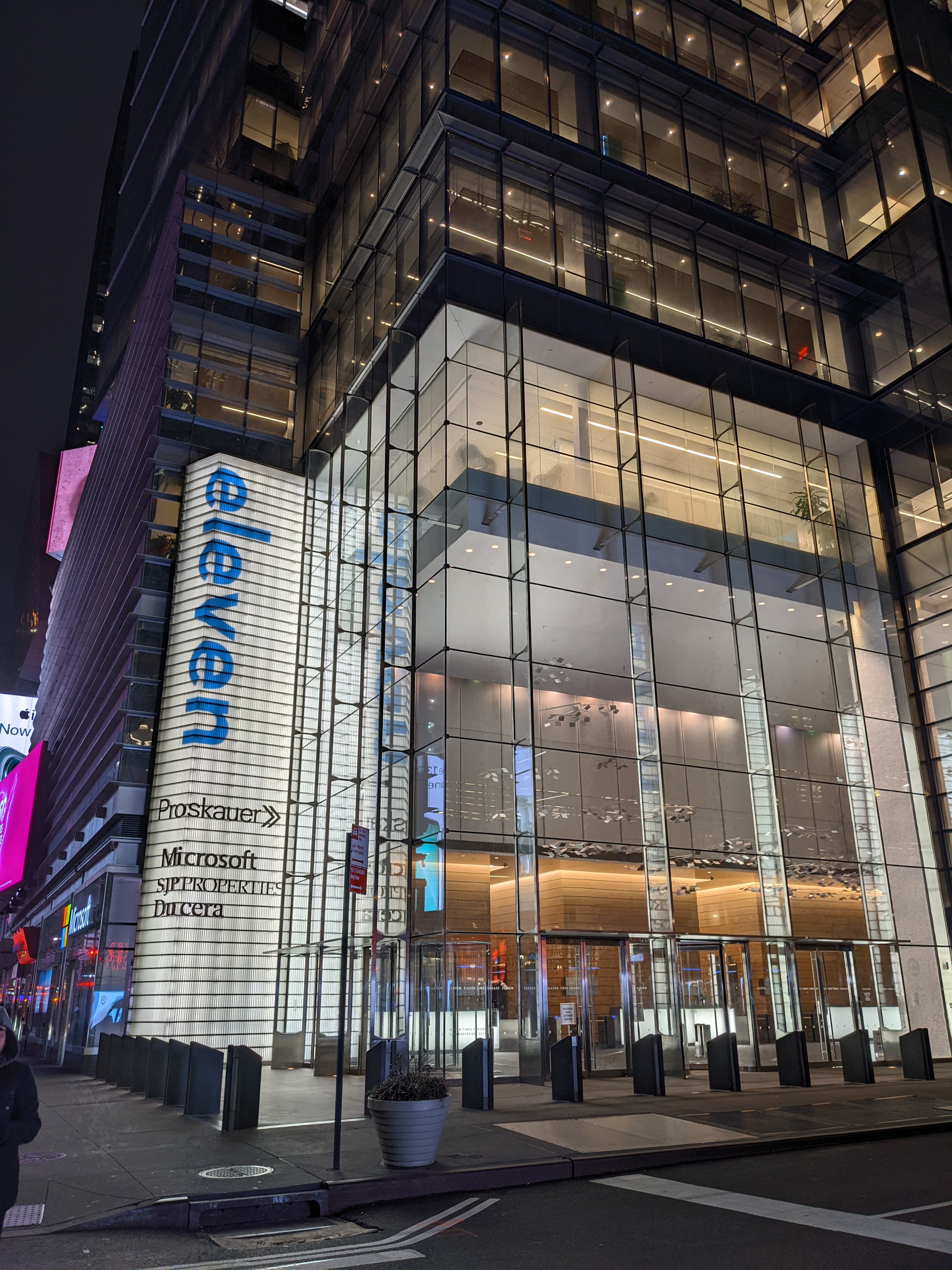
Entrance of the building

The project's developers began constructing the building in 2007 on spec without a single lease signed. Global law firm Proskauer Rose was the first to sign on at the project, taking roughly a third of the building's space in 2010. By the time the building opened in 2011, it was still only 40% leased.

In February 2015, Norges Bank Investment Management purchased a 45-percent stake in Eleven Times Square. SJP Properties and Prudential Real Estate Investors continue to own and control the building, and SJP Properties continues to manage, lease and operate the building.

== Tenants ==
Tenants include Microsoft Corp., law firm Proskauer Rose, hedge fund Moore Capital Management, British Telecom, E*TRADE, Kepos Capital and eMarketer. Before opening, the National Basketball Association, law firm Morrison & Foerster, and Buffalo Wild Wings had considered leasing space in the building but ultimately declined.

The tower has 55,000 square feet (5,110 m^{2}) of retail space. In 2017, the retail space was leased to Spanish company Parques Reunidos, which planned to open a Lionsgate Entertainment Palace before withdrawing in June 2019. Monopoly Lifesized rented the retail space in 2024.
