= Dan Kaplan (architect) =

American architect

Daniel J. Kaplan (born January 30, 1961) popularly known as Dan Kaplan is an American architect based in New York City, working at FXCollaborative.

He is a Fellow of the American Institute of Architects (FAIA), Cornell University alumnus, and was design partner on One Willoughby Square, The New York Times Building, Eleven Times Square, 3 Times Square, 4 Times Square, Allianz (Rönesans) Tower, and other office and residential buildings, most notably in New York City.
