= 12th & Midtown =

Commercial real estate development in Atlanta, Georgia

Coordinates: 33.784498°N 84.383188°W

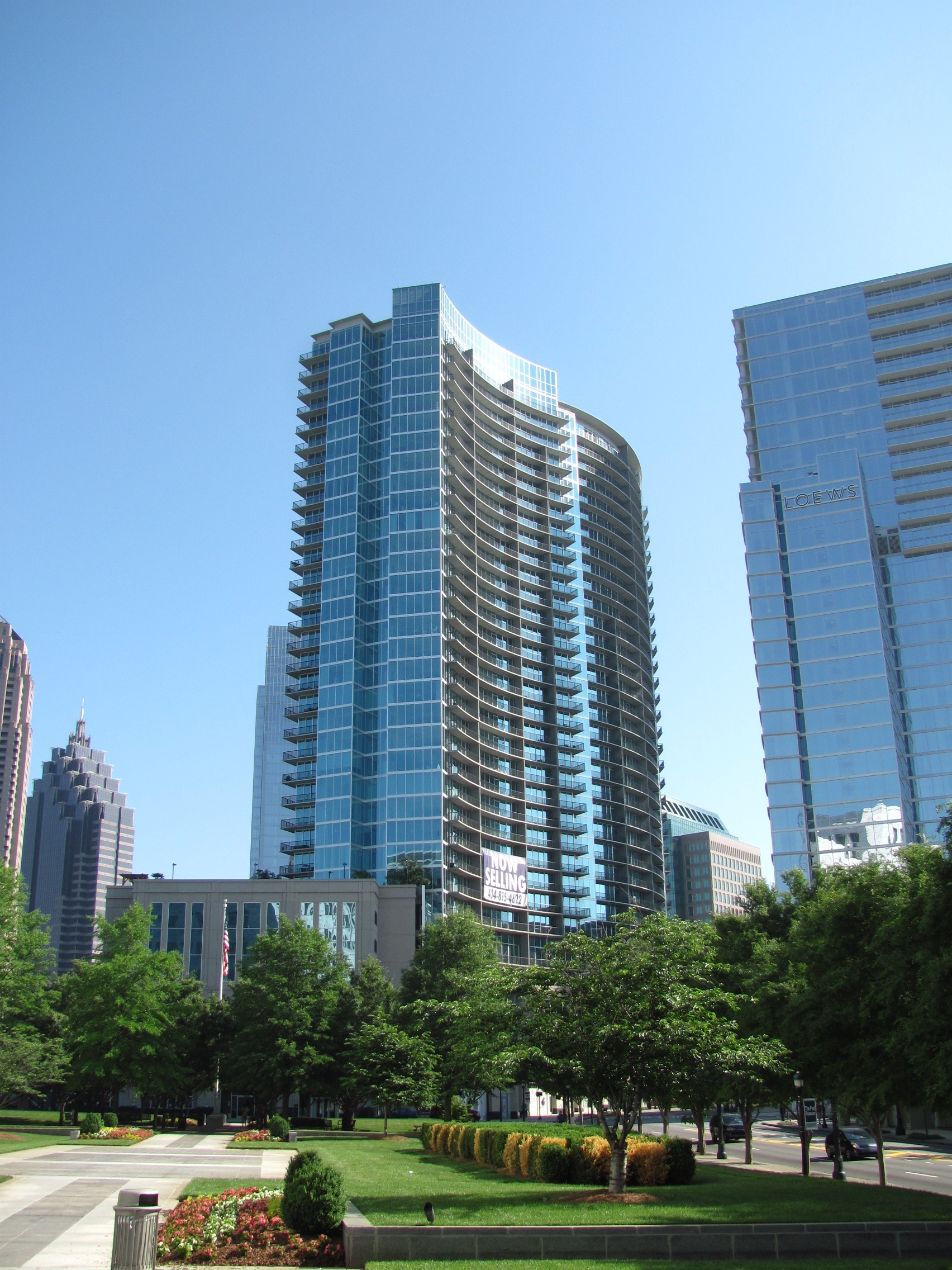
1010 Midtown

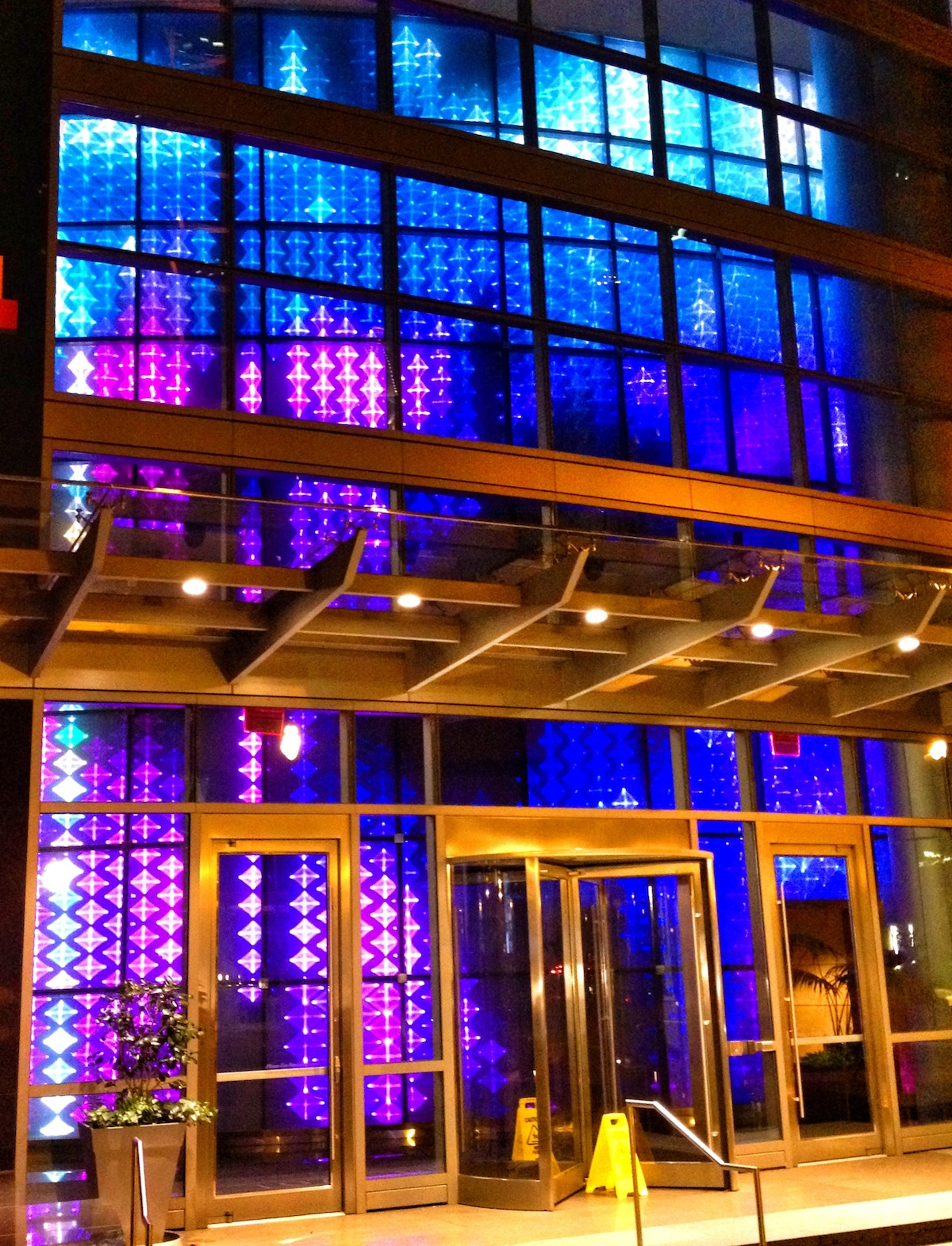
Lobby light show at 1075 Peachtree

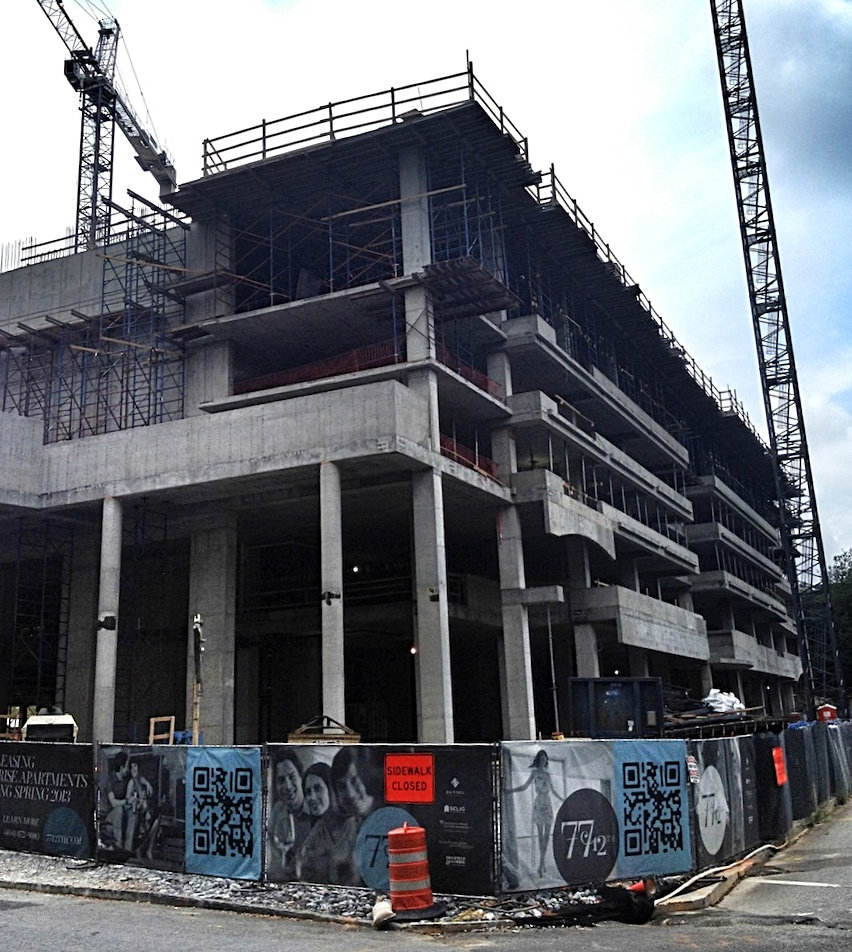
77 12th Street under construction, August 2012

12th and Midtown is a four-block commercial real estate development project in Midtown Atlanta along Peachtree Street and Crescent Avenue between 11th and 13th Streets. The development currently contains three of the tallest buildings in Midtown, with more buildings planned in the coming years.

Ground was broken in 2006. The developer, Selig, had an original plan for nine towers and 3,000,000 square feet (280,000 m^{2}) of residential and commercial space. The project was to be an anchor in the "Midtown Mile", a 2007 ambitious plan for upscale development along Peachtree Street in Midtown. The plan was scaled back significantly in 2011.

As of January 2013 the project includes the following buildings:

- 1010 Midtown, 35 stories, at 1080 Peachtree Street NE, completed 2008 - residential with retail and dining on ground floor
- 10 Sixty Five Midtown, 1065 Peachtree Street, 35 stories, residences and a Loews hotel
- 1075 Peachtree, 38 stories, offices anchored by PwC - restaurants on ground floor
- 77 12th Street, at Crescent Avenue, 22 stories, residential. The 330-unit tower will have 20,000 square feet (1,900 m^{2}) of ground-level retail space, and will curve along 12th Street and Crescent Avenue.

In late 2012, developers Daniel and Selig acquired an additional 4 acres (approx.)within a five-block radius of 12th & Midtown, including tracts along Peachtree Street, West Peachtree Street and Crescent Avenue. In January 2013, Selig announced that it expects the amount of retail space in the development to increase from the existing 130,000 square feet (12,000 m^{2}) to 200,000 square feet (19,000 m^{2})

In August 2014, C AND J ATLANTA LLC, an entity controlled by Florida real estate investor John Joyce, acquired 77 12th Street, the apartment tower at 12th & Midtown. The purchase price was $121 million, or $367,000 a unit.
