= Weil, Gotshal & Manges =

American law firm

Weil, Gotshal & Manges LLP
- Headquarters: General Motors Building; New York City, New York, United States
- No. of offices: 15
- No. of attorneys: 1,196 (2026)
- Major practice areas: General practice
- Key people: Ramona Nee, Executive partner Jonathon G. Soler, Managing partner
- Revenue: ▲$2.1 billion (2025)
- Date founded: 1931 (New York City)
- Founder: Frank Weil; Sylvan Gotshal; Horace Manges
- Company type: Limited-liability partnership
- Website: weil.com

Weil, Gotshal & Manges LLP (Note: Currently abbreviated as "Weil", previously as "Weil Gotshal" and "WGM".) (/ˈwaɪl ˈɡɒtʃ.əl ˈmæn.dʒiːz/ WILE GOT-chul and MAN-jeez) is an American multinational law firm headquartered in New York City. Founded in 1931, the firm has 1,217 attorneys and operates across North America, Europe, and Asia.

Weil is known for its work in corporate law, private equity, complex litigation, and bankruptcy and restructuring—fields in which the firm has maintained a leading practice for decades, especially well-known for representing debtors. The firm represented the debtors in six of the 10 largest U.S. bankruptcy filings in history, including Enron, GM, and Lehman Brothers. As The Wall Street Journal put it, "For half a century, when America’s largest corporations faced financial duress, their first call often went to one firm: Weil Gotshal & Manges."

For calendar year 2025, Weil reported annual revenues of over $2.02 billion, placing it among the top 30 firms in The American Lawyer's Am Law 100. Specifically, Weil was #29 in the main ranking of the Am Law 100 (based on revenue), as well as #20 in the closely followed ranking of profits per equity partner. In addition, Weil was ranked #38 in the 2026 NLJ 500, the 500 largest firms by lawyer headcount; #15 in The American Lawyer’s 2026 A-List, a holistic ranking that looks at a combination of both financial and cultural factors; and #15 in the 2026-2027 Vault 100, an annual ranking of the nation’s most prestigious law firms.

Despite its 2025 revenues placing it in roughly the top quarter of American law firms, Weil's leadership announced internally October 28, 2026 that they recommended dissolving the firm, partly due to an exodus by rainmaker partners to rival firms and subsequent failed merger talks.

== History ==
The firm was founded in New York City in 1931 by Frank Weil, Sylvan Gotshal, and Horace Manges. Since 1968, Weil has been headquartered in the General Motors building, overlooking Central Park, in New York City's Manhattan borough.

After its founding in 1931, the firm expanded its client base to include companies such as General Electric and General Motors, and becoming one of the largest law firms in the country. In 1975, the firm opened an office in Washington, D.C., its first outside New York City, followed in the 1980s by locations in Miami, Houston and Dallas. In 1991 Weil was the first global, non-California law firm to open a Silicon Valley office, in Redwood Shores, California. Later, the firm expanded its finance and private equity practice.

It established offices in Budapest, Prague, and Warsaw in the early 1990s, followed by the establishment of offices in Frankfurt, London, Munich and Paris.

In the 21st century, the firm opened offices in Beijing, Dubai, Hong Kong, and Shanghai; it later closed Dubai (2017) and ended its mainland China presence—shutting Beijing on December 31, 2023, and Shanghai in August 2024—while consolidating Asia operations in Hong Kong.

In November 2023, amid a wave of antisemitic incidents at elite U.S. law schools, Weil, Gotshal & Manges was among a group of major law firms who sent a letter to top law school deans warning them that an escalation in incidents targeting Jewish students would have corporate hiring consequences. The letter said "We look to you to ensure your students who hope to join our firms after graduation are prepared to be an active part of workplace communities that have zero tolerance policies for any form of discrimination or harassment, much less the kind that has been taking place on some law school campuses."

In July 2024, Weil opened new offices in Los Angeles and San Francisco, bringing on private equity partners Tana Ryan and Navneeta Rekhi from Latham & Watkins to lead the expansion.

Firm revenues exceeded $2 billion for 2025.

Former Weil attorney Gabriel Gershowitz was indicted for insider trading, in January 2026, as part of a scheme orchestrated over decades by a lawyer network of former Yale classmates and indicted co-conspirators. That May, it was reported that Gershowitz had pleaded guilty, and that prosecutors in the case had described affected law firms as victimized by those charged.

In April 2026, the firm expanded its German practice with the addition of partners Ingo Brinker and Niklas Brueggemann.

Weil partners have been rapidly leaving the firm since September 2026, when its mergers & acquisitions chief, Michael Aiello, and several partners in the same practice left for Cravath, Swaine & Moore.

Executive partner Barry Wolf is scheduled to retire in 2027; Weil, Gotshal & Manges exercises a mandatory retirement age of 68. 25-year firm veteran, co-managing partner Ramona Nee was to succeed Wolf, until she stepped down in October 2026.

=== Firm dissolution ===
On October 19, 2026, the Weil leadership team informed partners it was pursuing a merger with another firm. The merger discussions, between Weil and Willkie Farr & Gallagher, collapsed by October 23. It was initially reported by the Financial Times on October 28 that Weil was considering liquidation, and the firm announced plans internally to do so on the same day. Partners of the firm voted to wind it down in November 2026. Weil hired restructuring support from AlixPartners and Davis Polk.

== Notable cases ==
=== Acquisitions ===
- 2007: General Electric's $11.6 billion sale of GE Plastics to Saudi Basic Industries
- 2008: Olympus Corporation's Olympus scandal deal for British medical-equipment maker Gyrus earned Weil an undisclosed portion of the $687 million fee; the $2 billion acquisition was the largest in Olympus's history; the fee was shared with the deal's financial advisor and its broker. The auditor KPMG refused to issue an unqualified audit report due to issues with the Gyrus deal, for which a 21-attorney Weil team was legal advisor
- 2009: DirecTV's $25 billion stock-for-stock merger with Liberty Entertainment
- 2011: Sanofi Aventis's $18 billion acquisition of Genzyme
- 2012: General Electric's $35 billion joint venture with Comcast for ownership of NBC Universal
- 2014: DirecTV's $49 billion sale to AT&T
- 2014: Facebook's $19 billion acquisition of WhatsApp
- 2014: Lenovo's $2.9 billion acquisition of Motorola from Google
- 2015: Verizon's $4.4 billion acquisition of AOL
- 2015: Intel's $16 billion acquisition of Altera
- 2016: Oracle's $9 billion acquisition of NetSuite

=== Bankruptcies ===
- 2001: Enron bankruptcy
- 2002: WorldCom bankruptcy
- 2008: Washington Mutual bankruptcy
- 2008: Lehman Brothers bankruptcy
- 2009: General Motors chapter 11 bankruptcy
- 2018: Sears Holding's restructuring plan

=== Lawsuits ===
- 2003: ExxonMobil's successful breach of contract suit against Saudi Basic Industries resulting in a $400 million jury award, one of the largest in history
- 2007–2010: CBS Corporation's successful defense against a lawsuit filed by former reporter and news anchorman Dan Rather
- 2010: eBay's successful defense in trademark litigation with Tiffany & Co.

== Notable alumni ==
- Richard Ben-Veniste, member of the 9/11 Commission
- Adam Bodnar, former Polish Ombudsman for Citizen Rights and former Minister of Justice
- Jason Boyarski, music industry lawyer
- Vernon S. Broderick, judge of the United States District Court for the Southern District of New York
- Robert B. Charles, Assistant Secretary of State for International Narcotics and Law Enforcement Affairs
- Greg Coleman, first Solicitor General of Texas
- Gregg Costa, judge on the United States Court of Appeals for the Fifth Circuit
- Christopher Nixon Cox, grandson of Richard Nixon
- Mekka Don, rapper
- Barry Eisler, novelist, creator of John Rain novels
- Jill M. Friedman, who represented Guantanamo Bay detention camp prisoners, author of The Saudi Repatriates Report
- Charles Goldstein, real estate lawyer
- Martin D. Ginsburg, lawyer, husband of Ruth Bader Ginsburg
- Sylvan Gotshal, founding partner
- Lawrence Otis Graham, best-selling author
- Caitlin Halligan, Associate Judge, New York Court of Appeals, former Solicitor General of New York
- George J. Hazel, judge of the United States District Court for the District of Maryland
- Melinda Katz, Queens County District Attorney
- Jeffrey L. Kessler, sports industry lawyer
- Horace Manges, founding partner
- Bruce Meyer, executive director of the Major League Baseball Players Association
- Harvey R. Miller, Vice Chairman of Greenhill & Co.
- Ira Millstein, longest-practicing partner in big law.
- Tamika Montgomery-Reeves, associate justice of the Delaware Supreme Court
- Raymond Nimmer, former dean of the University of Houston Law Center
- Robert Odle, Assistant Secretary in the United States Department of Energy under Ronald Reagan
- Harriet Pilpel, women's rights activist
- John A. E. Pottow, professor at the University of Michigan Law School
- Rob Simmelkjaer, television journalist and executive
- Stanley Sporkin, senior judge on the United States District Court for the District of Columbia
- Robert R. Summerhays, judge of the United States District Court for the Western District of Louisiana
- Theodore Tannenwald Jr., judge of the United States Tax Court
- Heath Tarbert, former chairman of the Commodity Futures Trading Commission
- Suzanne Israel Tufts, Assistant Secretary in the United States Department of Housing and Urban Development
- Frank Weil, founding partner

== See also ==
- List of largest United States-based law firms by profits per partner
- List of companies based in New York City
