= Horace Manges =

American lawyer

Horace S. Manges
- Born: 1898; New York City, US
- Died: February 11, 1986 (aged 87); New York City, US
- Education: Columbia University (BA, LLB)
- Occupation: Lawyer
- Spouse: Nathalie Bloch (d. 1983)

Horace S. Manges (1898 – February 11, 1986) was an American lawyer, specializing in copyright law. He was a founding partner of Weil, Gotshal & Manges in 1931.

A native of New York City, Manges graduated from Columbia College and Columbia Law School. He became an authority on copyright law and served as a counsel to the American Book Publishers Council from 1953 to 1970. He advised publishers like Charles Scribner IV, and also represented many authors, including William Faulkner, John O'Hara, Truman Capote, Whittaker Chambers, and James Jones.

Together with Frank Weil and Sylvan Gotshal he founded Weil, Gotshal & Manges in 1931, which as of 2016 is one of the largest law firms in the world.

Manges was married to former Nathalie Bloch (d. 1983). The couple had two sons, Gerard H. Manges (d. 1983), and James H. Manges.
