= Sutherland Asbill & Brennan =

Defunct American law firm

Sutherland Asbill & Brennan LLP
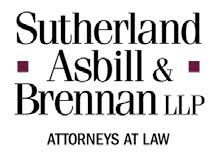
- Headquarters: Atlanta, GA
- No. of offices: 8
- No. of attorneys: 422
- Major practice areas: Investment funds Corporate, Tax; Energy & environmental Financial services Intellectual property Litigation, Real estate
- Key people: Mark D. Wasserman (Managing Partner)
- Date founded: 1924
- Company type: Limited liability partnership
- Website: www.sutherland.com

Sutherland Asbill & Brennan LLP, rebranded to the abbreviated name of Sutherland, was an AmLaw 100 American law firm. Founded in 1924 by William Sutherland and Elbert Tuttle as Sutherland & Tuttle, the firm originally achieved national prominence on tax issues. Sutherland's practice extended throughout the United States and worldwide, and was focused on seven major practice areas: corporate, energy and environmental, financial services, intellectual property, litigation, real estate, and tax. As of January 2011, the firm had approximately 422 attorneys.

== History ==
Founded in 1924 by William Sutherland and Elbert Tuttle, the firm of Sutherland & Tuttle first established a practice in the tax field. In the ensuing years, the firm developed practices in corporate, energy, financial services, intellectual property, litigation and real estate. In 1933, Joseph Brennan became partner and the firm became known as Sutherland, Tuttle & Brennan. The firm opened an office in Washington, DC in 1937. In 1949, Mac Asbill, Sr. joined the Washington office. In 1954, firm co-founder Elbert Tuttle accepted an appointment to the United States Court of Appeals for the 5th Circuit. Upon his departure, the firm was renamed Sutherland Asbill & Brennan LLP, the name it was known by for more than 50 years.

In the 1970s and 80s, Sutherland expanded in the fields of energy, financial services, technology and intellectual property law. The 1980s saw the firm's litigation practice expand and in the 1990s the firm reached the 300-lawyer mark and opened an office in Austin. In the early 2000s, Sutherland launched its intellectual property group and opened offices in New York and Houston.

== Merger ==
In 2014, Sutherland combined with Arbis LLP in London and Geneva to create a global energy practice. In December 2016, Eversheds and Sutherland partners voted to merge as Eversheds Sutherland. On February 1, 2017, the firms became equal members in a new entity and currently do business around the world as Eversheds Sutherland. At the time of the combination with Eversheds, Sutherland had 400 lawyers operating in eight offices in the US and Europe.

== Notable partners ==
- David I. Adelman – former partner, United States Ambassador to Singapore
- Alfred C. Aman, Jr. - former associate attorney, renowned professor of administrative law, author, and professor at Indiana University Maurer School of Law
- Carolyn Chiechi - former partner, judge on the United States Tax Court
- Charles Goldstein - former partner
- David A. Gross - former partner, United States Ambassador
- Carla Wong McMillian - former partner, Vice Chief Judge, Georgia Court of Appeals
- Jack Reed - former associate attorney, current United States Senator for Rhode Island
- Michael B. Thornton - former associate attorney, judge on the United States Tax Court
- Margaret Richardson - partner, former Commissioner of Internal Revenue Service (deceased)
- Stacey Abrams - former attorney, former House Minority Leader for the Georgia General Assembly
- Randolph W. Thrower - partner, former commissioner of the Internal Revenue Service
- Elbert Tuttle - founder, and later the chief judge of the United States Court of Appeals for the Fifth Circuit
- W. Scott Sorrels, former partner, National Commissioner of the BSA
