= Robert Odle =

American lawyer (1944–2019)

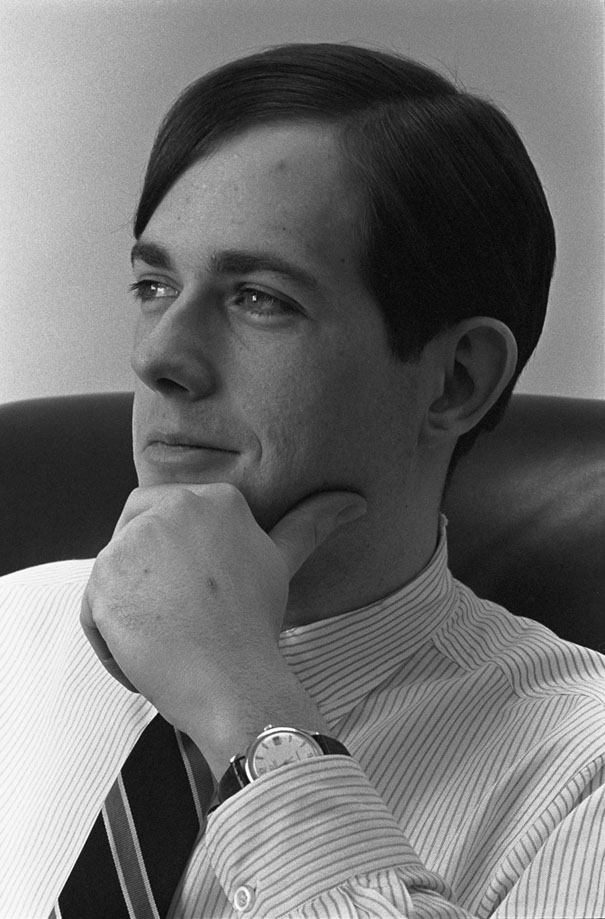
- Odle during the Nixon administration in March 1969
- Born: Robert C. Odle Jr. February 15, 1944; Port Huron, Michigan, U.S.
- Died: October 2, 2019 (aged 75); Alexandria, Virginia, U.S.
- Education: Wayne State University; Detroit College of Law (JD)
- Occupation: Lawyer
- Spouse: Lydia Ann Karpinol (m. 1969)
- Children: 1 (adopted)

Robert C. Odle, Jr. (February 15, 1944 – October 2, 2019) was a public official in the Nixon Administration and Reagan Administration and an American lawyer, based in Washington, D.C.

== Early life ==
Odle was born in Port Huron, Michigan (February 15, 1944) and earned a bachelor's degree from Wayne State University in 1966. He then enrolled at the Detroit College of Law (now Michigan State University College of Law), earning his J.D. in 1969.

== Politics and government service ==
Odle worked on the Nixon campaign in 1968, while still in law school, and after graduation in 1969 he joined the staff of White House communications director Herb Klein. He left the White House for the 1972 presidential campaign, serving as Director of Administration of the Committee to Re-Elect the President. In President Nixon's second term, Odle was appointed deputy assistant secretary for the U.S. Department of Housing and Urban Development.

Because of his role in the 1972 re-election campaign, Odle became a witness before the Watergate Committee, testifying as the first witness on the first day of televised hearings on May 17, 1973. In his testimony, he praised President Nixon and the "million volunteers across the country” and most of the 400 in the re-election committee headquarters who had nothing to do with Watergate, including himself. He also testified about contact he had with James McCord, Jeb Stuart Magruder, and G. Gordon Liddy, and particularly H. R. Haldeman and Attorney General John N. Mitchell.

In 1981, Odle was nominated by Ronald Reagan to be the Assistant Secretary for Congressional, Intergovernmental and Public Affairs at the U.S. Department of Energy. He was confirmed by the Senate and served in this role until 1985.

== Private practice ==
Between 1976 and 1981, Odle worked for the International Paper Company as Washington corporate affairs representative.

In 1985, Odle joined the Washington, D.C. office of the law firm Weil, Gotshal & Manges, LLP, where he became a partner and represented clients before Congress and federal agencies. He retired in 2015, after 30 years with the firm.

Odle served as pro-bono general counsel for the Richard Nixon Foundation. He was also active in the Roman Catholic Diocese of Arlington, The Heritage Foundation, and the Federalist Society.

== Family ==
Odle married his wife, Lydia Ann (Karpinol) Odle, in 1969. They moved to Alexandria, Virginia in 1972 and adopted their son, John Paul, from Russia in 1994.

Odle died from cancer on October 2, 2019, at his home in Alexandria.
