= Home Park (disambiguation) =

Home Park may refer to:

== Places ==
- Home Park (Atlanta), a neighborhood of Atlanta
- Home Park, Windsor, an area of parkland associated with Windsor Castle
- Hampton Court Park, London, also known as Home Park

== Sports ==
- Home Park, an association football stadium located in Plymouth, England, home to Plymouth Argyle F.C.

== See also ==
- Horn Park, Royal Borough of Greenwich, also historically known as Home Park
- Home (sports)
