= Museum of Design Atlanta =

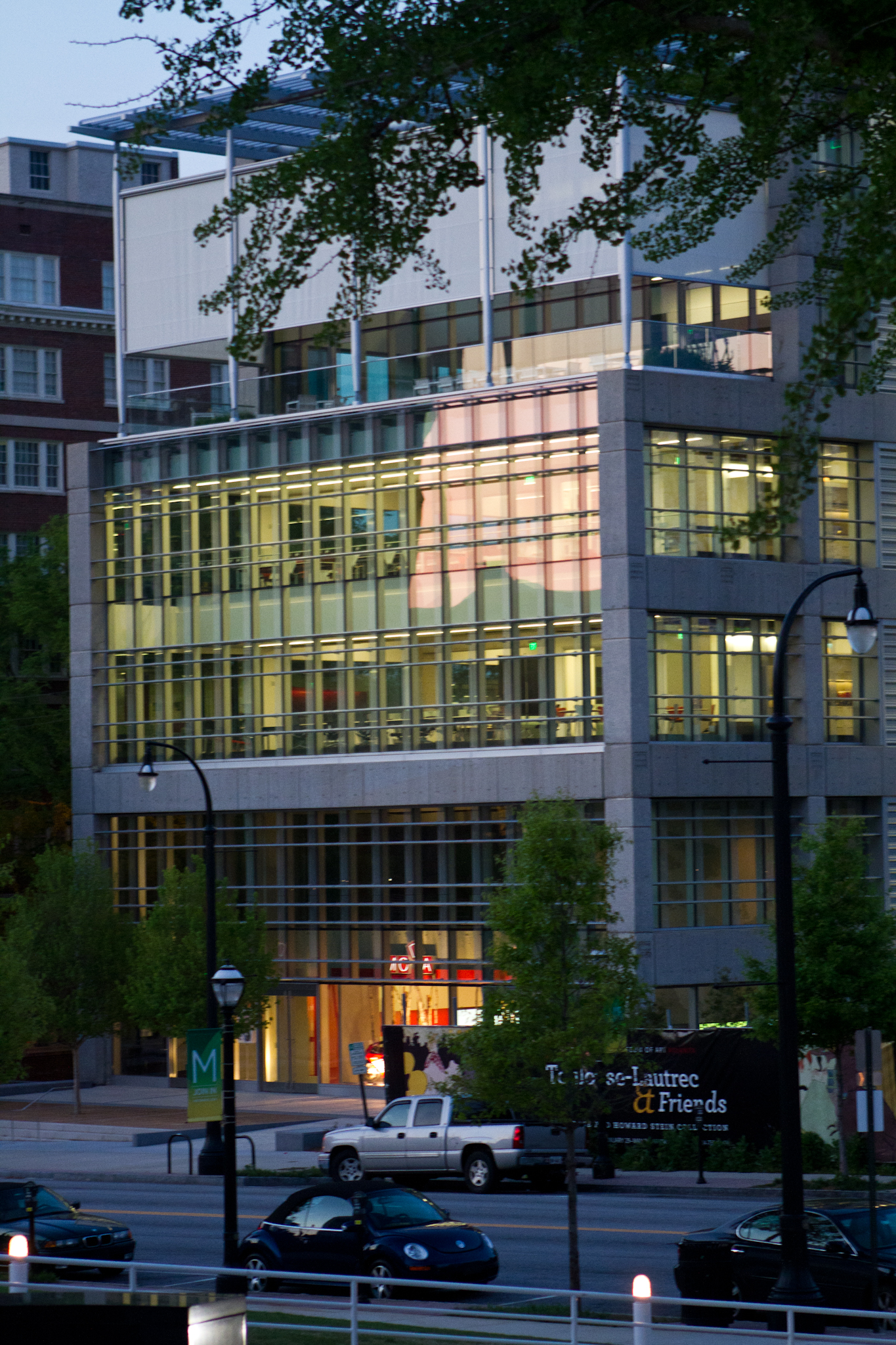

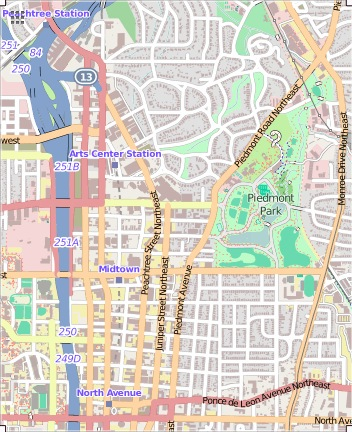
- location in Midtown Atlanta
- Established: 1993
- Location: 1315 Peachtree Street; Atlanta
- Coordinates: 33.790648°N 84.384634°W
- Type: Design museum
- Directors: Dr. Laura Flusche, Ph.D.
- Website: www.museumofdesign.org

The Museum of Design Atlanta (MODA) is a design museum located in Atlanta, Georgia, United States. It is billed as “the only museum in the Southeast devoted exclusively to the study and celebration of all things design."

== Overview ==
The museum examines how design affects people's daily lives through exhibitions, K-12 educational outreach, and adult programming. MODA regularly features exhibitions on architecture, industrial and product design, interiors and furniture, graphics, fashion and more.

The museum is located on Peachtree Street, across from the High Museum of Art, in Midtown.

== History ==
MODA first opened in 1989 as the Atlanta International Museum of Art & Design, and was located in the Peachtree Center district of Downtown Atlanta. In 2003, after receiving a series of local grants, the group rebranded and refocused itself as a design museum, launching a critically lauded run of exhibits on subjects such as Bauhaus virtuoso Marcel Breuer, Japanese architecture, and ladies handbag design.

In 2011, MODA opened at its present location in Midtown Atlanta at the corner of 16th Street and Peachtree Street on the ground floor (and former parking garage) of a building restored by the architectural firm Perkins+Will. While the upper floors house Perkins+Will and the Peachtree Branch of the Atlanta Public Library, the museum occupies 9,000 square feet (840 m^{2}) of street-level space in the LEED Platinum-certified building.

On December 31, 2012, Brenda Galina left as executive director. In early January 2013, the Board of Directors appointed Laura Flusche as the new executive director.

== Exhibitions ==
The first exhibit at the museum's new Midtown location was Passione Italiana: Design of the Italian Motorcycle. Curated by Joe Remling of ai3, Inc., the exhibition presented a dozen Italian motorcycle designs spanning the last five decades with designs by MV Agusta, Ducati, Bimota, and Moto-Morini.

Other 2011 exhibitions included WaterDream, a survey of the history of bathroom design, followed by a retrospective of a quarter-century of international AIDS posters.

2012 exhibitions included Emerging Voices 11, an exhibition dedicated to celebrating the work and talent of Atlanta's young architecture community. This was done in partnership with AIA Atlanta and the Young Architects Forum Atlanta. Following that exhibit was Stories in Form: Chair Design by the Portfolio Center. The works featured in Stories in Form were created as part of the Portfolio Center's course "Modernism: History, Criticism and Theory", which explores design history as a catalyst for new design ideas. While learning about Modernism, the history of design and the development of critical thinking skills, students in the course create chairs by means of a design process that combines inspiration from a historical period with personal experience. In addition to demonstrating the step-by-step design process that brings these chairs into being, the exhibition highlighted the ways in which design objects tell stories of design history and personal experience.

Another exhibit was Skate It or Hang It!? The Evolution of Skateboard Art. The exhibition, curated by W. Todd Vaught, examined the visual aspects skateboarding, a sport important to contemporary youth culture since the 1970s, by presenting a broad range of styles, imagery, and visual expression in skateboard art. With a broad focus on skateboard graphics—in particular the styles and methods used to embellish skateboard decks—the exhibition appealed to a broad range of skateboarders, designers, artists and to Atlanta's youth in general.

Beginning 2013 was The South's Next Wave: Design Challenge. This was presented as part exhibition, part competition; pairing designers of interior spaces with object designers to create imaginative vignettes throughout the museum. The exhibit was curated by David Goodrowe and Tim Hobby, co-founders of the failed design firm Goodrowe/Hobby which later declared bankruptcy.

Other exhibits at the museum have focused on alternative voices in game design, the work of architect Eero Saarinen, the work of designer Paul Rand, the design of everyday things, designing for social impact and other topics.

== Exhibition space ==
The exhibition space at MODA is 6,500 square feet (600 m^{2}) in two main galleries with clean, industrial lines and concrete floors. The front desk area can double as a reception space and the back gallery has a vaulted ceiling with windows stretching up two stories. The museum has a built-in A/V system with ceiling-mounted digital projectors, track lighting that can switch on via motion detector, and banks of security cameras.

== See also ==
- High Museum of Art
- SCAD-Atlanta
