= First Presbyterian Church of Atlanta =

Coordinates: 33.7907°N 84.3857°W

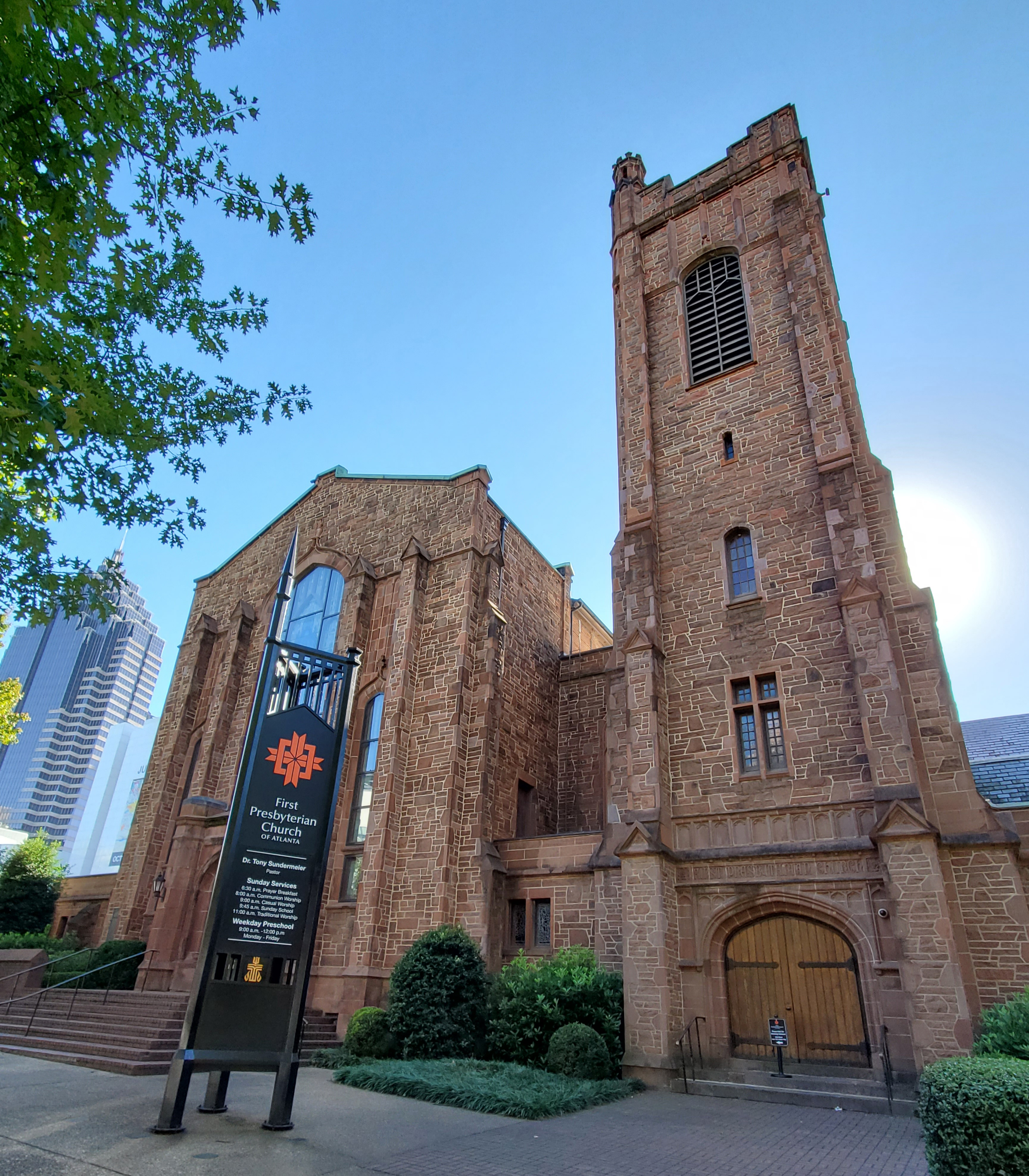
- First Presbyterian Church of Atlanta (2020)
- First Presbyterian Church of Atlanta
- Location: Atlanta, Georgia, United States
- Denomination: Presbyterian Church (U.S.A.)

First Presbyterian Church of Atlanta is a congregation of the Presbyterian Church (U.S.A.) located in the Midtown section of Atlanta, Georgia. First Presbyterian Church was founded in 1848, and it was Atlanta's first Presbyterian house of worship. The original church building on Marietta Street was vacated in April 1916 and the property was sold to the U.S. government for the construction of the headquarters of the Federal Reserve Bank of Atlanta. The current church building on Peachtree Street was listed on the National Register of Historic Places in 2020.

The church, which hosts a congregation of 2,000 members, is located across 16th Street from the High Museum of Art.

== First Presbyterian Church of Atlanta's History ==
When the church was founded on January 8, 1848 there were only nineteen Presbyterians worshiping at the log building known as the male academy. "This church was incorporated in February, 1854." "The name under which it was first incorporated was the 'First Presbyterian Church of Atlanta,' and it was the only Presbyterian church in the city." The founding pastor of First Presbyterian Church was Dr. John S. Wilson. In 1915 the church completed a Sunday School building at the new location where the first service was held on December 5, 1915. The new sanctuary, which was designed by Walter T. Downing (1865–1918), was completed in 1919. The first stained glass windows, some by Tiffany, were installed then and over the next few years.

First Presbyterian Sunday morning worship service was broadcast on local WSB (AM) radio. The only time the service on the radio was suspended was September 3, 1939, when the United Kingdom declared war on Germany and brought the world to the brink of World War II. In 1973, the church received its first black member since the days of slavery. Now the church is led by Dr. Tony Sundermeier who became pastor in 2014.

== Mission and Values ==
IS TO HUMBLY FOLLOW JESUS CHRIST

FPC Values

COMMUNITY

Spiritual home → a place to belong for a lifetime of faith;

Enduring commitment → ordering our lives around worship, education and service to God;

Authentic diversity → building relationships that honor one another as children of God;

LOVE

Radical hospitality → sharing with all the welcome we receive in Jesus Christ;

Mutual care → giving and receiving shelter, nurture and spiritual fellowship;

Restorative relationships → seeking reconciliation with God and one another

TRANSFORMATION

Continual conversion → being shaped as disciples through God’s grace and the power of the Holy Spirit;

Joyful Worship → gathering to give thanks and praise to our Creator, Redeemer, and Sustainer;

Theological Formation → pursuing deeper relationship with God through study, discernment, and spiritual discipline

SERVANT LEADERSHIP

Bold humility → acknowledging our dependence on God by following the example of Jesus Christ in an increasingly secular world;

Just generosity → using all that we have received to promote justice, righteousness, and human dignity;

Missional living → proclaiming God’s Good News in everything we say and do

== Organ ==
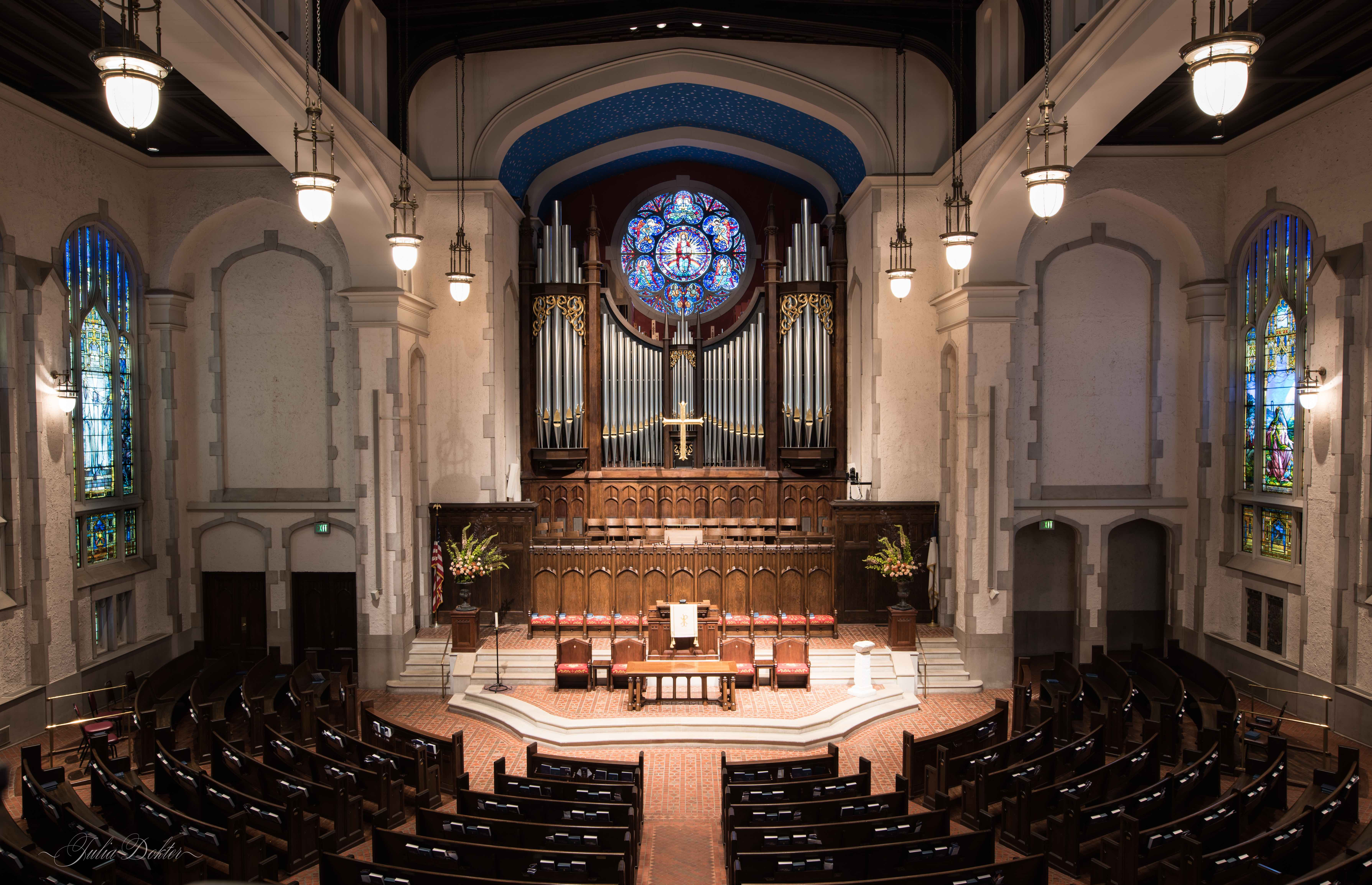
Sanctuary Organ at FPC Atlanta

After finishing the church in 1919 the first organ was constructed by Henry Pilcher's Sons in 1919 with 4 manuals. In 1920 the Echo- and Solo-sections were added, and the organ had 48 stops. In 1969 organ builder M. P. Möller (Hagerstown/MD) built a completely new organ, using some stops from the Pilcher's organ from 1919. In 1992 the instrument was restored and enlarged. In 2018 the instrument again was cleaned and restored and newly enlarged by German organ builder Klais (Bonn) and US organ builder A. E. Schlueter. The Instrument has 112 ranks (6.397 pipes) on 10 divisions, with a control system by Syndyne.

=== Main Organ (Chancel) ===
I Manual C–c^{4}
	Choir Organ
1.	Principal	8'
2.	Hohlflöte	8'
3.	Flauto Dolce	8'
4.	Flûte céleste	8'
5.	Cello	8'
6.	Octave	4'
7.	Koppelflöte	4'
8.	Flachflöte	2'
9.	Mixture III
10.	Posaune	16'
11.	Posaune	8'
12.	Schalmei	8'
13.	Trompette (en chamade)	8'
	Tremolo
	Crown Positive
14.	Principal	8'
15.	Prestant	4'
16.	Spillflöte	4'
17.	Nasat	2^{2}/_{3}'
18.	Hohlpfeife	2'
19.	Septime	1^{1}/_{7}'
20.	Sesquialtera II	2^{2}/_{3}'
21.	Scharf III
22.	Dulzian	16'
23.	Clarinette	8'
	Tremolo

II Great Organ C–c^{4}
24.	Contra Bourdon	32'
25.	Principal	16'
26.	Quinte	10^{2}/_{3}'
27.	Principal	8'
28.	Flûte harmonique	8'
29.	Gambe	8'
30.	Holzbourdon	8'
31.	Quinte	5^{1}/_{3}'
32.	Octave	4'
33.	Spitzflöte	4'
34.	Cornet II-III
35.	Superoctave	2'
36.	Mixture IV
37.	Trompete	8'

III Swell Organ C–c^{4}
38.	Rohrgedackt	16'
39.	Geigenprincipal	8'
40.	Rohrgedackt	8'
41.	Salicional	8'
42.	Vox céleste	8'
43.	Principal	4'
44.	Nachthorn	4'
45.	Nazard	2^{2}/_{3}'
46.	Piccolo	2'
47.	Tierce	1^{3}/_{5}'
48.	Larigot	1^{1}/_{3}'
49.	Progressio II-III
50.	Trompette	16'
51.	Trompette	8'
52.	Hautbois	8'
53.	Vox Humana	8'
54.	Clairon	4'

IV Solo Organ C–c^{4}
55.	Doppelflöte	8'
56.	Viola pomposa	8'
57.	Viola pomposa céleste	8'
58.	Flûte octaviante	4'
59.	Grand Cornet V	8'
60.	Posaune	16'
61.	English Tuba	8'
62.	Tuba Clairon	4'
63.	Trompette (en chamade)	8'

Orchestral C–c^{4}
64.	Principal	16'
65.	Rohrgedackt	16'
66.	Gemshorn	16'
67.	Rohrgedackt	8'
68.	Flûte harmonique	8'
69.	Cello	8'
70.	Streicherschwebung	8'
71.	Quinte	5^{1}/_{3}'
72.	Flûte octaviante	4'
73.	Posaune	16'
74.	Trompette	16'
75.	Posaune	8'
76.	Trompette	8'
77.	Clarinette	8'
78.	Vox Humana	8'
79.	Trompette (en chamade)	8'
	Chimes

Pedal Organ C–g^{1}
80.	Contra Bourdon	32'
81.	Principal	16'
82.	Violon	16'
83.	Rohrgedackt	16'
84.	Bourdon	16'
85.	Quinte	10^{2}/_{3}'
86.	Octave	8'
87.	Spitzflöte	8'
88.	Cello	8'
89.	Bourdon	8'
90.	Rohrgedackt	8'
91.	Terz	6^{2}/_{5}'
92.	Quinte	5^{1}/_{3}'
93.	Bourdon	4'
94.	Septime	4^{4}/_{7}'
95.	Choralbass	4'
96.	Spitzflöte	4'
97.	None	3^{5}/_{9}'
98.	Spitzflöte	2'
99.	Bombarde	32'
100.	Holzposaune	16'
101.	Posaune	16'
102.	Trompette	16'
103.	Trompette	8'
104.	Clairon	4'
105.	Trompette (en chamade)	8'
106.	Trompette (en chamade)	4'

=== Gallery Organ ===
I Great C–c^{4}
1.	Principal	8'
2.	Gedackt	8'
3.	Octave	4'
4.	Fifteenth	2'
5.	Sifflet	1'
6.	Mixture II-IV

II Swell C–c^{4}
7.	Gemshorn céleste	8'
8.	Gemshorn	8'
9.	Hohlflöte	4'
10.	Rohrnasat	2^{2}/_{3}'
11.	Principal	2'
12.	Blockflöte	2'
13.	Scharf III
14.	Trompette	8'
	Tremolo

III Echo C–c^{4}
15.	Gemshorn	16'
16.	Gedackt	8'
17.	Aeoline	8'
18.	Gamba	8'
19.	Gamba céleste	8'
20.	Fugara	4'
21.	Krummhorn	16'
22.	Orchestral Oboe	8'
23.	Musette	4'
	Tremolo

Pedal C–g^{1}
24.	Subbass	16'
25.	Bourdon	16'
26.	Bourdon	8'
27.	Gedackt	8'
28.	Rohrflöte	4'
29.	Fagott	16'
30.	Trompette	8'

- Couplers
  - 8'-Couplers: CH/GT, POS/GT, CH/SW, POS/SW, CH/SOLO, POS/SOLO, GT/CH, GT/POS, SW/CH, SW/POS, SW/GT, SOLO/CH, SOLO/POS, SOLO/GT, SOLO/SW; GT(Gal)/CH, GT(Gal)/POS, GT(Gal)/GT, GT(Gal)/SW, GT(Gal)/SOLO, SW(Gal)/CH, SW(Gal)/POS, SW(Gal)/GT, SW(Gal)/SW, SW(Gal)/SOLO, ECHO(Gal)/GT, ECHO(Gal)/CH, ECHO(Gal)/POS, ECHO(Gal)/SW, ECHO(Gal)/SOLO; CH/Ped, POS/Ped, GT/Ped, SW/Ped, SOLO/Ped; GT(Gal)/Ped, SW(Gal)/Ped, ECHO(Gal)/Ped
  - 16'-Couplers: CH/GT, POS/GT, SW/CH, SW/POS, SW/GT, SOLO/CH, SOLO/POS, SOLO/GT; GT(Gal)/GT, SW(Gal)/GT, ECHO(Gal)/GT; GT(Gal)/GT(Gal), SW(Gal)/SW(Gal), ECHO(Gal)/ECHO(Gal)
  - 4'-Couplers: CH/GT, POS/GT, SW/CH, SW/POS, SW/GT, SOLO/CH, SOLO/POS, SOLO/GT; GT(Gal)/GT, SW(Gal)/GT, ECHO(Gal)/GT; GT(Gal)/GT(Gal), SW(Gal)/SW(Gal), ECHO(Gal)/ECHO(Gal); CH/Ped, POS/Ped, GT/Ped, SW/Ped, SOLO/Ped; GT(Gal)/Ped, SW(Gal)/Ped, ECHO(Gal)/Ped
  - ORCHESTRAL-Couplers: ORCH/I, ORCH/II, ORCH/III, ORCH/IV, ORCH/PED
- Effect stops: Zimbelstern, Tower Bells
- Special Features
  - Full record playback on Touch Screen
  - Programmable Crescendo, 4 different per user
  - Up to 50 users with 100 levels of memory each
  - 2 blank pistons that allow programming non standard coupling at any pitch
  - Sostenuto
  - All Swells to Swell
  - Registerfessel
  - Pedal Divide (Settable Divide, default C13)
  - French Manual Transfer
