= Tenth Street (Atlanta) =

Coordinates: 33°46′53.5″N 84°23′37″W

Tenth Street is a street in Midtown Atlanta, Georgia.

== Route and Points of Interest ==
Neighborhood	Intersection	Points of Interest
Home Park, West Midtown		Tenth Street starts
Home Park, West Midtown	Brady St.	Miller Union restaurant
Home Park, West Midtown	Howell Mill Road	
border of Home Park, West Midtown and Georgia Tech	Northside Drive	Georgia Tech
Midtown Core, Midtown	Downtown Connector	
Midtown Core, Midtown	Spring St. West Peachtree St.	Midtown MARTA station
Midtown Core, Midtown	Peachtree Street	Federal Reserve Bank of Atlanta, Margaret Mitchell House & Museum, 999 Peachtree
Historic Midtown	Piedmont Ave.	Peachtree Road Race finish line, Piedmont Park, historic bungalow district
Historic Midtown	Charles Allen Drive	Henry W. Grady High School
Historic Midtown	Monroe Drive	BeltLine trail, border of Virginia-Highland neighborhood

== History ==
=== Tight Squeeze ===
The area around what is now Tenth and Peachtree Streets began as Tight Squeeze, a lawless shantytown during the period following the American Civil War. It consisted of shanties, together with a blacksmith shop and several small wooden stores, beside a 30-foot-deep ravine, still visible to the east of Peachtree north of 10th Street.

During the desperate times after the Civil War, the hungry, homeless, wounded, and hopeless filled Atlanta's streets. The ravine became a rest stop to both freedmen and displaced Confederate veterans, some who had been left morphine addicts.

Just north of the ravine where Peachtree crossed a country road (now 14th Street), was a wagon yard, where freight was unloaded, destined for the merchants in the city, which lay further south. Merchants on their way to the wagon yard and carrying the cash that the freight companies demanded, or merchants returning with wagons loaded with goods, slowed to circumvent the ravine. Tight Squeeze's residents, as well as professional highwaymen, attacked merchants and robbed them of their merchandise and cash. It was said that it "took a mighty tight squeeze to get through with one's life," the origin of the settlement's name. Desperation inspired rowdyism and "lewd vagrancy". John Plaster was a member of a pioneer farm family for whom Plaster's Bridge Road was named (now Piedmont Road). In 1866 at the age of 35, he was murdered in Tight Squeeze after delivering a load of firewood to customers in Atlanta.

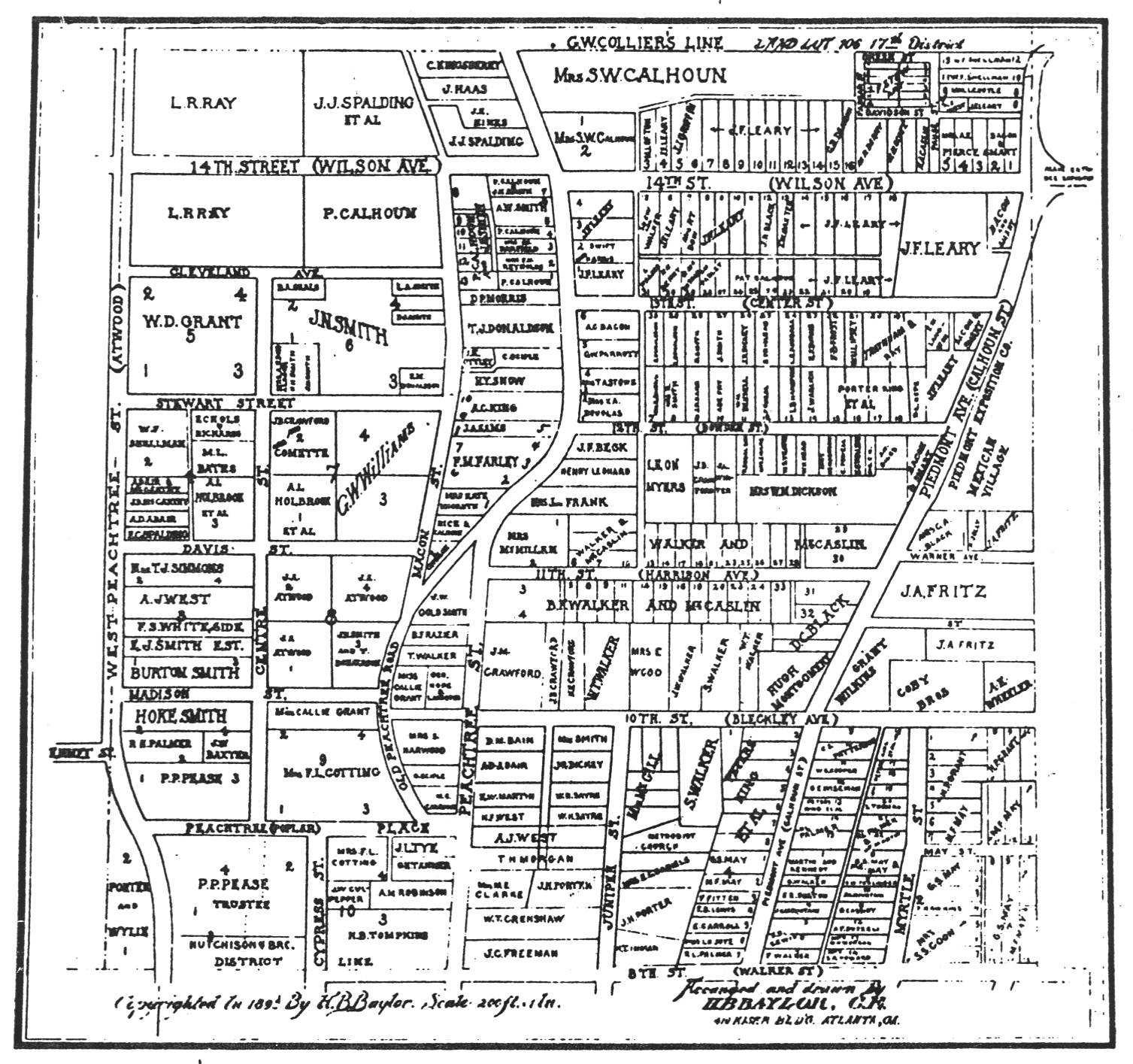
Map of the 10th and Peachtree area in 1895

=== Blooming Hill ===
In the late 1800s the area was rechristened Blooming Hill and consisted of elegant single-family houses. By 1872 the Atlanta Constitution called it "a considerable little town outside the corporate limits of Atlanta" which had two grocery stores. Blooming Hill is commemorated by a sculpture at the Hyatt Midtown hotel. During this period 10th Street was also known as Bleckley Avenue. By 1883 the area was rechristened "North Atlanta".

=== Tenth Street Shopping District ===
From the 1920s to the early 1960s the area was an upscale shopping area, the first major one outside the Central District (Downtown Atlanta), attracting customers from affluent neighborhoods throughout the city.

== The Strip ==
The 1959 opening of Lenox Square and 1964 opening of Ansley Mall lowered sales in the Shopping District. The area became a famous hippy hangout and acquired the name of The Strip. By 1967 the hippy movement had been seriously repressed and the area stagnated. Many businesses were set on fire (arson) and many buildings were torn down to make way for parking lots.

== Today ==
Today Tenth Street west of Piedmont Avenue is an integral part of the Midtown Core high-rise business and residential district.
