= Midtown Atlanta =

- Neighborhood
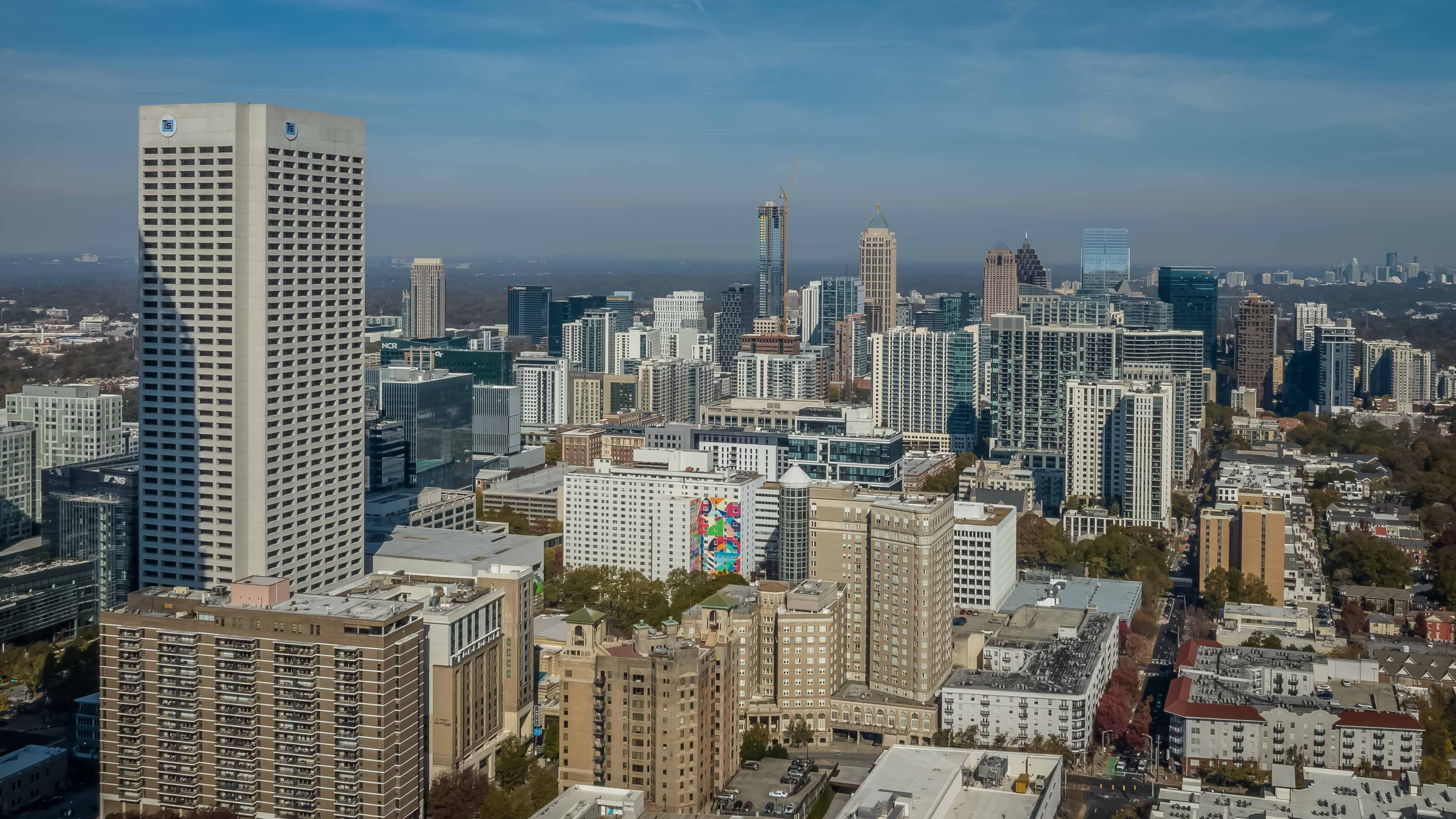
- Midtown skyline in 2025

- Midtown location in Central Atlanta
- Coordinates: 33.7868014°N 84.3795169°W
- Country: United States
- State: Georgia
- County: Fulton County
- City: Atlanta
- Council District: 2 (most)
- NPU: E
- Neighborhoods: Midtown Core; Historic Midtown (Midtown Neighborhood); Ansley Park; Sherwood Forest; Atlantic Station; Home Park; Loring Heights.; Morningside

Area
  - Total: 3.8 sq mi (9.8 km^{2})
  - Midtown Core: 1.1 sq mi (2.9 km^{2})
  - Midtown Core and Historic Midtown: 1.9 sq mi (4.9 km^{2})
- Source: Midtown Alliance

Population (2011 est.)(Greater Midtown)
  - Total: 41,681
  - Density: 11,000/sq mi (4,200/km^{2})
  - Midtown Core: 12,916
- Source: Midtown Alliance

Daytime workforce
  - Midtown Core: 43,347
  - Greater Midtown: 81,418

Student population (college/university)
  - Midtown Core: 43,347
  - Greater Midtown: 81,418
- ZIP Codes: 30308–30309
- Website: Midtown Alliance

Midtown Atlanta, or Midtown for short, is a high-density commercial and residential neighborhood of Atlanta, Georgia. The exact geographical extent of the area is ill-defined due to differing definitions used by the city, residents, and local business groups. However, the commercial core of the area is anchored by a series of high-rise office buildings, condominiums, hotels, and high-end retail along Peachtree Street between North Avenue and 17th Street. Midtown, situated between Downtown to the south and Buckhead to the north, is the second-largest business district in Metro Atlanta. In 2011, Midtown had a resident population of 41,681 and a business population of 81,418.

Midtown has the highest density of art and cultural institutions in the Southeast, notably including the Fox Theatre, Woodruff Arts Center, the High Museum of Art, the Center for Puppetry Arts, the Atlanta Symphony Orchestra, and the Museum of Design Atlanta. Midtown attracts more than six million visitors annually, mostly in connection with large annual events such as the Atlanta Dogwood Festival, Music Midtown, and Georgia Tech athletic games. Since the 1990s, Midtown has also been a primary area for high-density development due to the area's mass transit options, urban street grid, and desirability.

== Geography and nomenclature ==
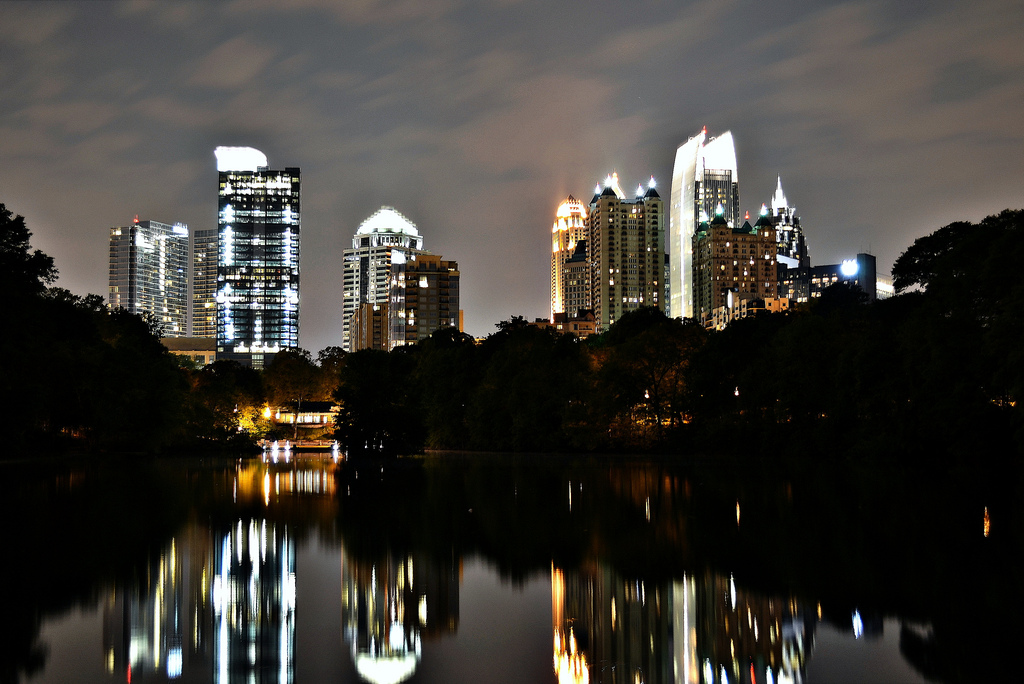
The Midtown skyline at night, viewed from Piedmont Park

The definition and meaning of "Midtown" have varied over time, expanding from an original concept of a small neighborhood midway between Downtown and Buckhead. Boundary definitions vary by source. In many cases, Midtown is a quasi-legal entity for zoning, law enforcement, and tax purposes. It is defined by the City of Atlanta to include the business district along Peachtree Street as well as Historic Midtown, the residential area east of Piedmont Avenue and to the south of Piedmont Park.

The Midtown Alliance defines a larger, "Greater Midtown" area of approximately four square miles. This includes the area within the city's definition, but splitting it into the sub-areas Midtown Core and Midtown Garden District, i.e. Historic Midtown. It also includes the neighborhoods of Ansley Park, Sherwood Forest, Atlantic Station, Home Park, and Loring Heights.

The area has gone by other names in the past. An 1897 source refers to the area as North Atlanta, which would later be the name of today's city of Brookhaven. The 1897 "North Atlanta" encompassed (roughly) most of today's Midtown, Georgia Tech, and English Avenue. Sources from the 1950s and early 1960s refer to the area as "Uptown Atlanta," a moniker which would later be applied instead to Buckhead following its annexation.

== History ==
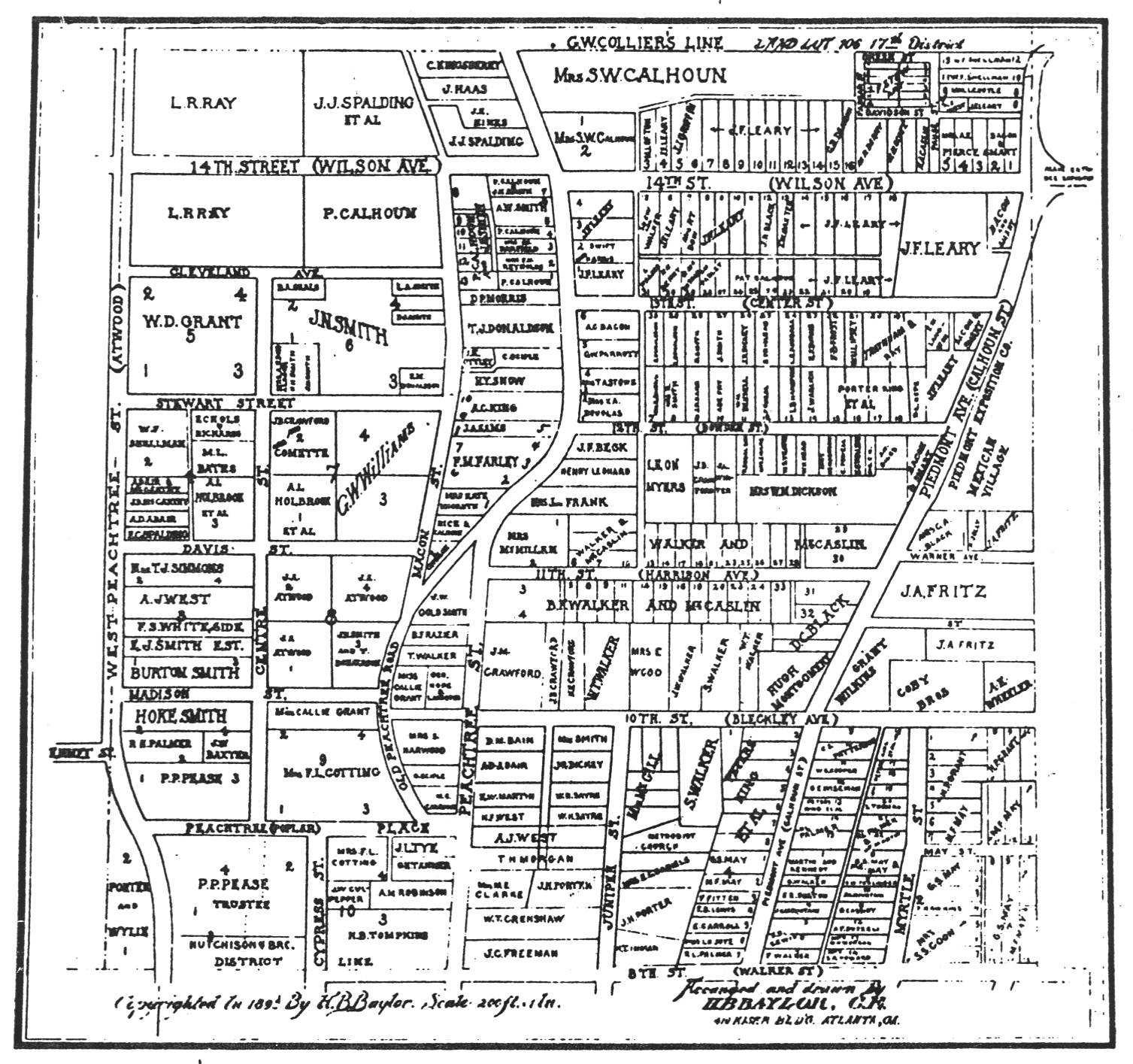
A map of part of Midtown Atlanta, 1895

The southern half of Midtown between 8th Street and North Ave was originally purchased by Richard Peters in 1848 to use the pine forest there for fuel for his downtown flour mill. Over the next 40 years, Peters slowly subdivided sections of these land lots off for a gridded residential area and built his own home there on Peachtree at 4th Street. His son, Edward, built his home on the block bounded by North Avenue, Piedmont Avenue, Ponce de Leon Avenue, and Myrtle Street. The home, now called Ivy Hall, was restored by the Savannah College of Art & Design in 2008 and is listed on the National Register of Historic Places.

After the Civil War, Peachtree between what is now 8th and 12th streets was still about a mile beyond the city limits, which ended at Pine Street. After the American Civil War a shantytown named Tight Squeeze developed at Peachtree at what is now 10th Street. It was infamous for vagrancy, desperation, and robberies of merchants transiting the settlement. As Atlanta grew ever further outwards from its historic center, mansions were constructed along Peachtree Street and the area around 10th was known as Blooming Hill.

Cross streets were built and residential development began around 1880. Piedmont Park was established with the Piedmont Exposition of 1887, followed by the Cotton States and International Exposition of 1895, lending the area new prominence. Electric streetcar lines extended along Piedmont Avenue by 1895 and along Peachtree Street (to Brookwood) by 1900.

In 1904, the development of Ansley Park began. By the 1920s, Tenth and Peachtree had become the nexus of a significant shopping district for the surrounding neighborhood. The 1910 Encyclopædia Britannica listed Peachtree Street in Midtown as one of the finest residential areas of the city, along with Ponce de Leon Circle (now Ponce de Leon Avenue), Washington Street, and Inman Park.

The Downtown Connector freeway opened in the 1950s, and the blocks between Williams Street and Techwood Drive were demolished to make way for it. In 1959 Lenox Square and in 1964, Ansley Mall opened, and the Tenth Street shopping district went into decline. By the late 1960s, Peachtree Street between Eighth and Fourteenth Streets had become a center of hippie culture known as The Strip

Large-scale commercial development began with Colony Square, the first mixed-use development in the Southeast, which was built between 1969 and 1973. The MARTA subway line opened in 1981. In the 1980s, many older properties were demolished, some remaining vacant for decades. High-density commercial and residential development took root in the north–south corridor along Peachtree and West Peachtree. The BellSouth Center (1982), now the AT&T Midtown Center, was long the landmark skyscraper in the area. However, commercial development escalated after 1987, when One Atlantic Center was completed.

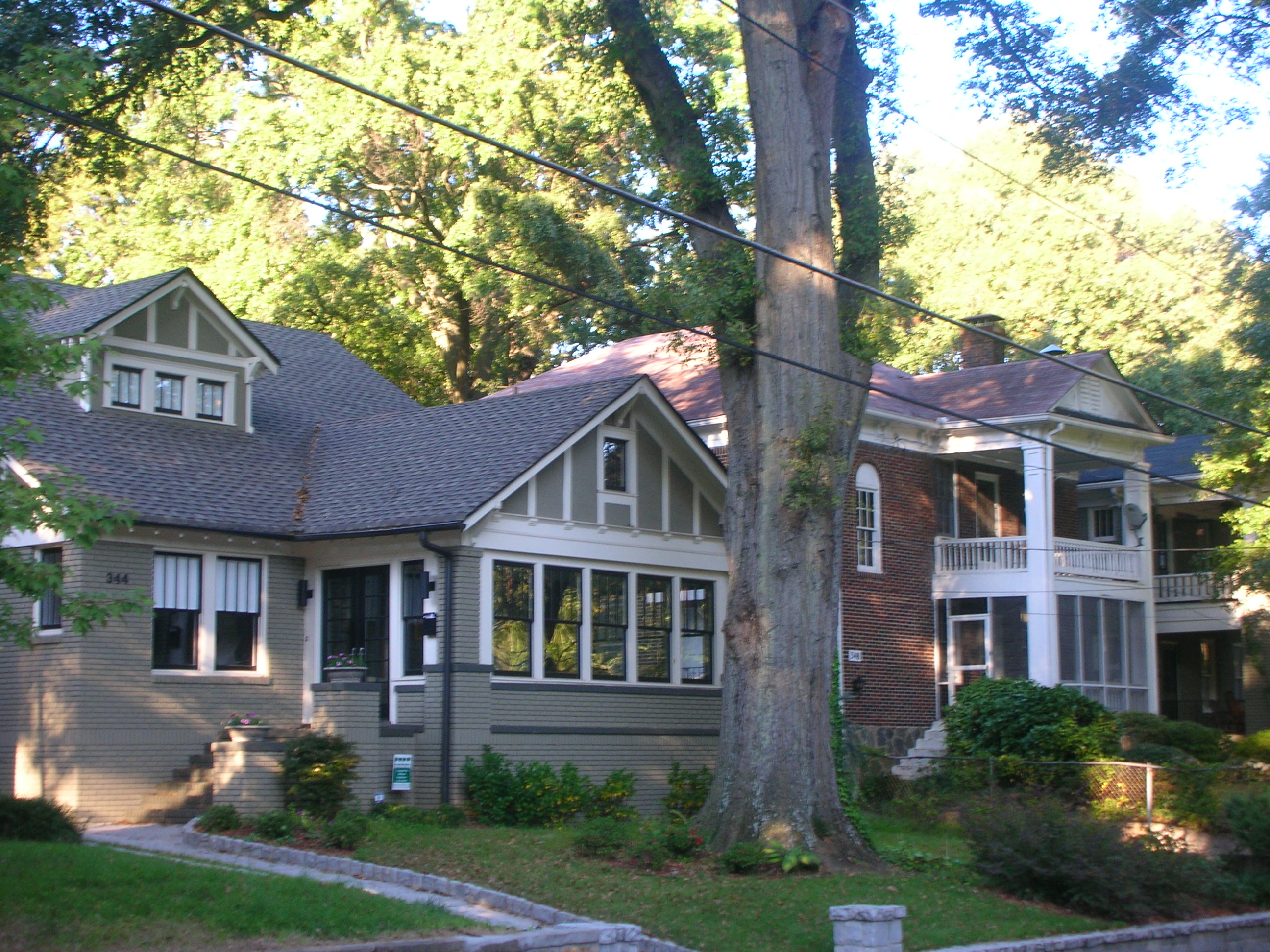
Bungalows in the Midtown Historic District

The 2000s decade saw the construction of numerous high-rise condo buildings in Midtown, such as the Spire, Viewpoint, and 1010 Midtown. In 2006, then-Mayor Shirley Franklin set in motion a plan to make the 14-block stretch of Peachtree Street a street-level shopping destination. The 2004 opening of the Seventeenth Street Bridge over the Downtown Connector reconnected Midtown with the west side of the city and to the Atlantic Station mixed-use development, which was built on the former site of the Atlantic Steel company.

The Midtown Alliance, a group of volunteers, employees, and business and community members, was formed in 1978 in order to work towards improving the overall quality of life in Midtown and transform it into an ideal place for people to actively live, work, and play. Activities of the Alliance include improving neighborhood safety, developing area arts and education programs, and building community leaders. The master plan from the Alliance, called Blueprint Midtown, is credited with fueling the economic resurgence that has helped the once downtrodden Midtown area transform over the past number of years into a popular neighborhood.

A 2011 Creative Loafing article claimed that:

No part of the city has evolved more dramatically over the past two decades ... Impersonal office buildings, imposing parking decks and cold asphalt arteries have given way to high-rise living and an explosion of street life ... Where once there was a wasteland, now there are great restaurants, groceries, specialty shops, townhouses, lofts, and ... people.

== Architecture and historic districts ==
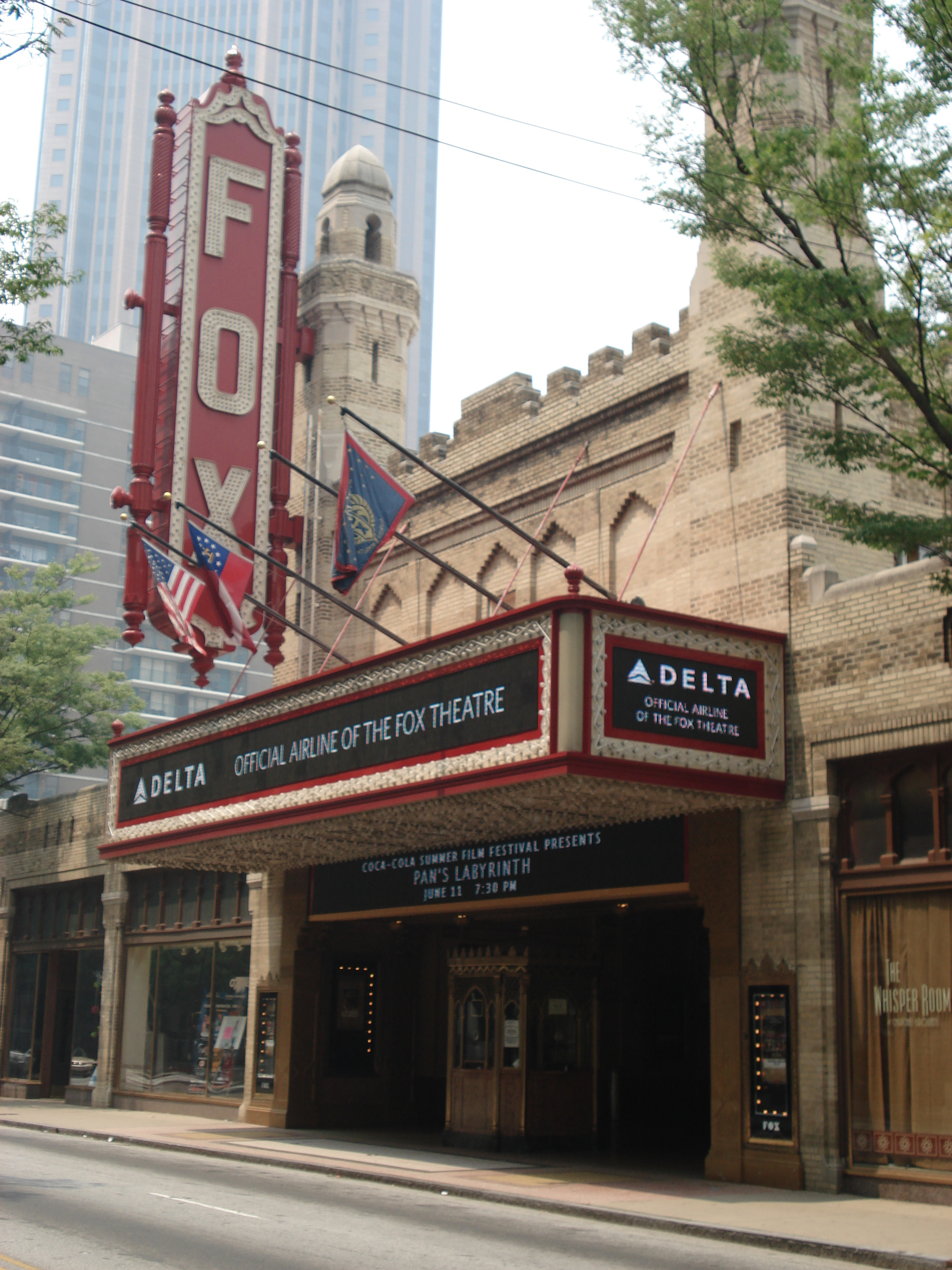
The Fox Theatre, a cultural icon of Atlanta

In the early 1980s, Midtown Atlanta was a blighted area mainly consisting of parking lots. By 1987, One Atlantic Center was built on the corner of West Peachtree Street and 14th Street, which kick-started the redevelopment of the area. Some contemporary buildings of note are:

- High Museum of Art by Richard Meier and Renzo Piano
- One Atlantic Center by Philip Johnson
- 1100 Peachtree
- 1180 Peachtree
- AT&T Midtown Center
- Four Seasons Hotel
- Promenade II
- Spire
- ViewPoint
- 1010 Midtown

In the area surrounding Peachtree Street, very little of the original architecture was preserved. Some of the notable exceptions listed on the National Register of Historic Places include the Margaret Mitchell House, Rhodes Hall, Edward C. Peters House, and the Academy of Medicine.

Historic districts include the Fox Theatre Historic District and Historic Midtown; both are listed on the National Register of Historic Places. The Fox Theatre Historic District comprises the Fox Theatre (Oliver Vinour et al., 1929), William Lee Stoddart's Georgian Terrace Hotel (1911), Stoddart's Italianate Ponce de Leon Apartments (1913), and the Cox-Carlton Hotel (1925). Historic Midtown, which includes most of Midtown east of Piedmont Avenue, is noted for its bungalows and Queen Anne style houses.

== Parks and recreation ==
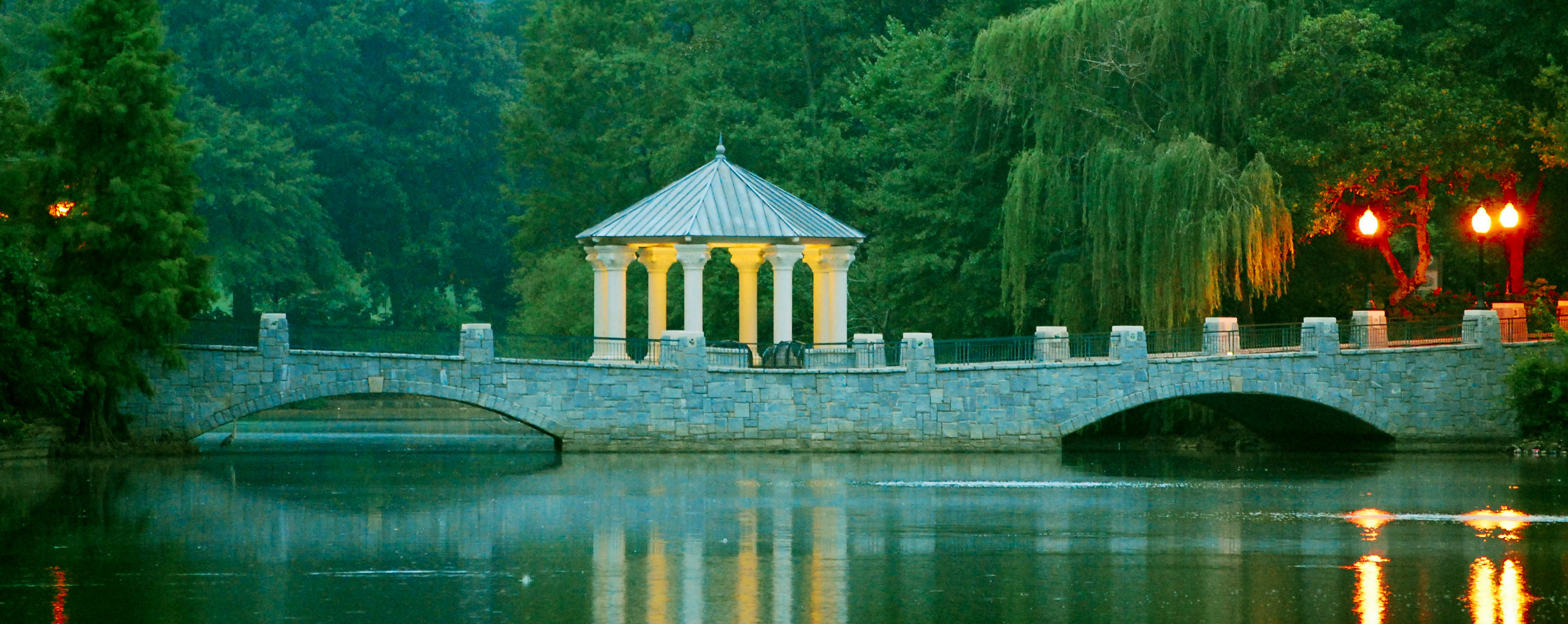
Bridge over Lake Clara Meer in Midtown's Piedmont Park

Midtown's focal point is the expansive greenspace of Piedmont Park, which underwent a major expansion in 2011. The park is surrounded by the Midtown business district to its west, Ansley Park to its northwest, the Beltline, Morningside, and Virginia Highland to its east, and the Midtown Historic District to its south. The Atlanta Botanical Garden adjoins the Park.

The Beltline is a 22-mile-long (35 km) trail circling the older neighborhoods of central Atlanta which will be developed in stages. The Beltline Eastside Trail connects Piedmont Park (at the intersection of 10th and Monroe) to the Inman Park MARTA station at DeKalb Avenue. The "Art on the Beltline" project has resulted in the installation of several contemporary art pieces on the trail.

== Economy ==
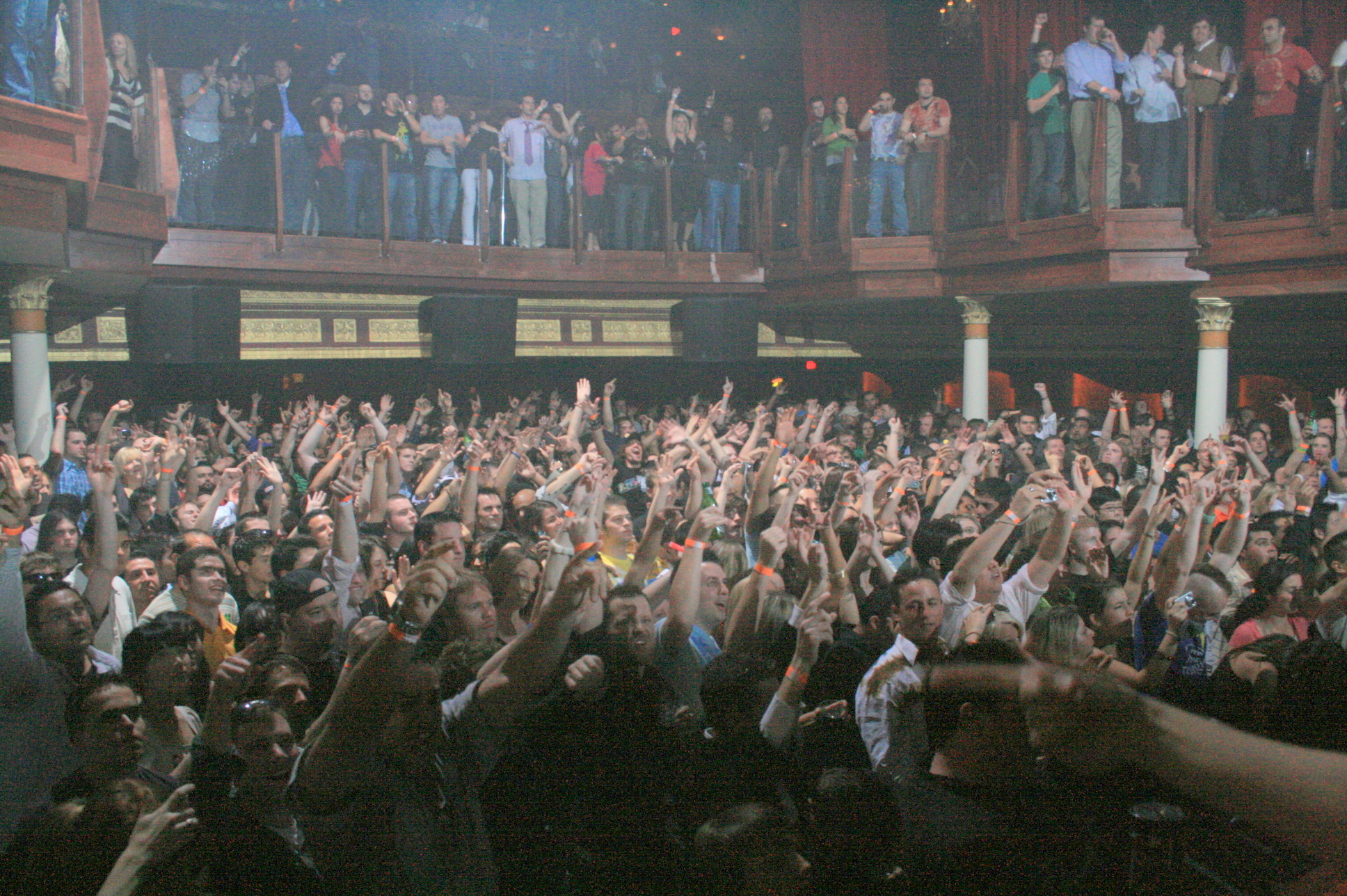
People dancing to Paul van Dyk in one of Midtown's clubs

Midtown Atlanta is a commercial district in its own right, containing 22 million square feet (2,000,000 m^{2}) of office space, with 8.2 million square feet (760,000 m^{2}) of office space added to the area since 1997, with up to 3.8 million square feet (350,000 m^{2}) more planned. Furthermore, Midtown is home to many corporate headquarters, such as Equifax, EarthLink, Invesco,The Coca-Cola Company, NCR, and CNN/Warner Bros. Discovery, as well as other corporations with a sizeable presence, such as Norfolk Southern, Wells Fargo, PriceWaterhouseCoopers, and AT&T Inc.

Carter's, Inc. had its headquarters in Midtown but moved to Buckhead in 2013. Regional offices for companies such as Google, Arcapita, and Jason's Deli are located in Midtown. Major law firms such as King & Spalding and Kilpatrick & Stockton are also located in Midtown. In April 2019, the largest Whole Foods Market in the southeastern United States opened in Midtown.

Midtown is also home to a share of Atlanta's diplomatic missions. The Consulate-General of Canada is located at 100 Colony Square Building, as is the Netherlands Foreign Investment Agency. The Consulate-General of Switzerland in Atlanta is located in the Two Midtown Plaza building. The Taipei Economic and Cultural Office, representing the Republic of China, is located in the Atlantic Center Plaza. The Consulate-General of Israel to the Southeast is also located in Midtown. From 1995 to 2002, the Consulate-General of Japan in Atlanta was in Colony Square before moving to Buckhead.

=== Retail ===
Immediately adjacent to Midtown on the southeast side along the Beltline are the large Ponce City Market lifestyle center in the former Sears building, Midtown Promenade power center with Home Depot and other big box stores, and Midtown Place community shopping center with a Trader Joe's and a cinema multiplex. Atlantic Station a large regional mall and lifestyle center, and the community-size Ansley Mall are adjacent to Midtown's north end. Some retail shops are located along Peachtree Street but the area has not been a major shopping destination since the 1960s and a boulevard of upscale shops envisioned in 2006 never came to establish itself. burgeoning restaurant scene buoyed by lunch crowds from employees of the surrounding businesses.

== Arts and culture ==
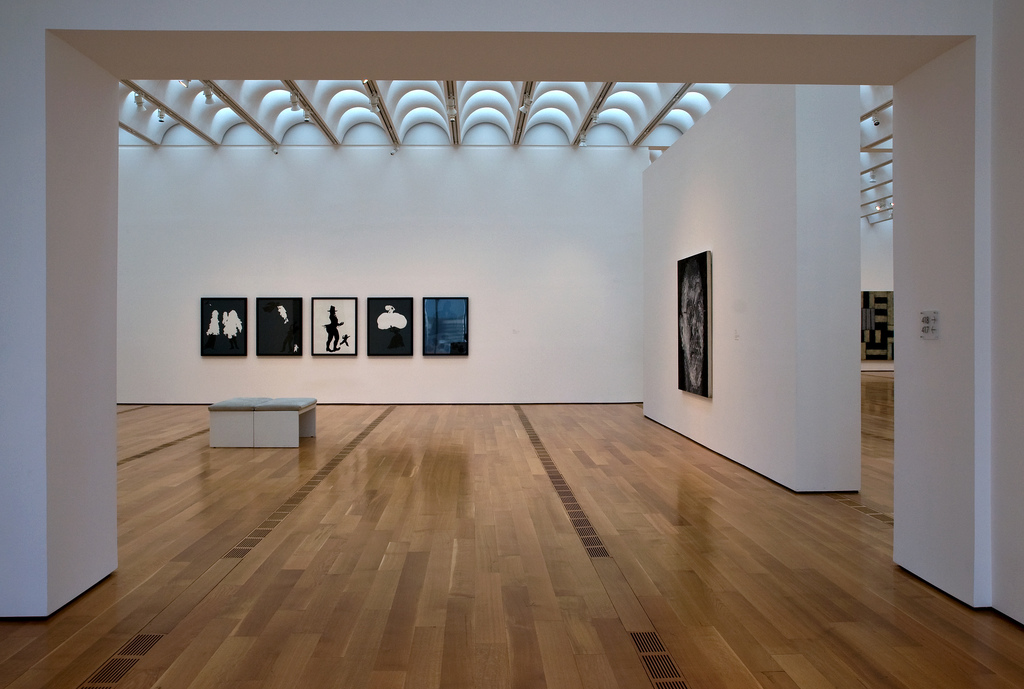
The interior of the High Museum of Art

Midtown is known by many residents as Atlanta's "Heart of the Arts". It is the home of the Ferst Center for Arts, Fox Theatre, the Woodruff Arts Center, the Atlanta Botanical Garden, the Richard Meier- and Renzo Piano-designed High Museum of Art, as well as the Atlanta Ballet, Atlanta Symphony Orchestra, Center for Puppetry Arts, and other arts and entertainment venues. Recently, the Woodruff Arts Center and its campus were expanded. Future additions will include a new Atlanta Symphony Center.

The High Museum of Art has collaborated with major art museums to house temporary collections of masterpieces, most notably the Louvre and the Metropolitan Museum of Art. Across the street from the High is the Museum of Design Atlanta (MODA), the only museum in the Southeast devoted exclusively to the study and celebration of all things design. Midtown is the home of the Atlanta campus of Savannah College of Art and Design, which is located in historic buildings throughout the district.

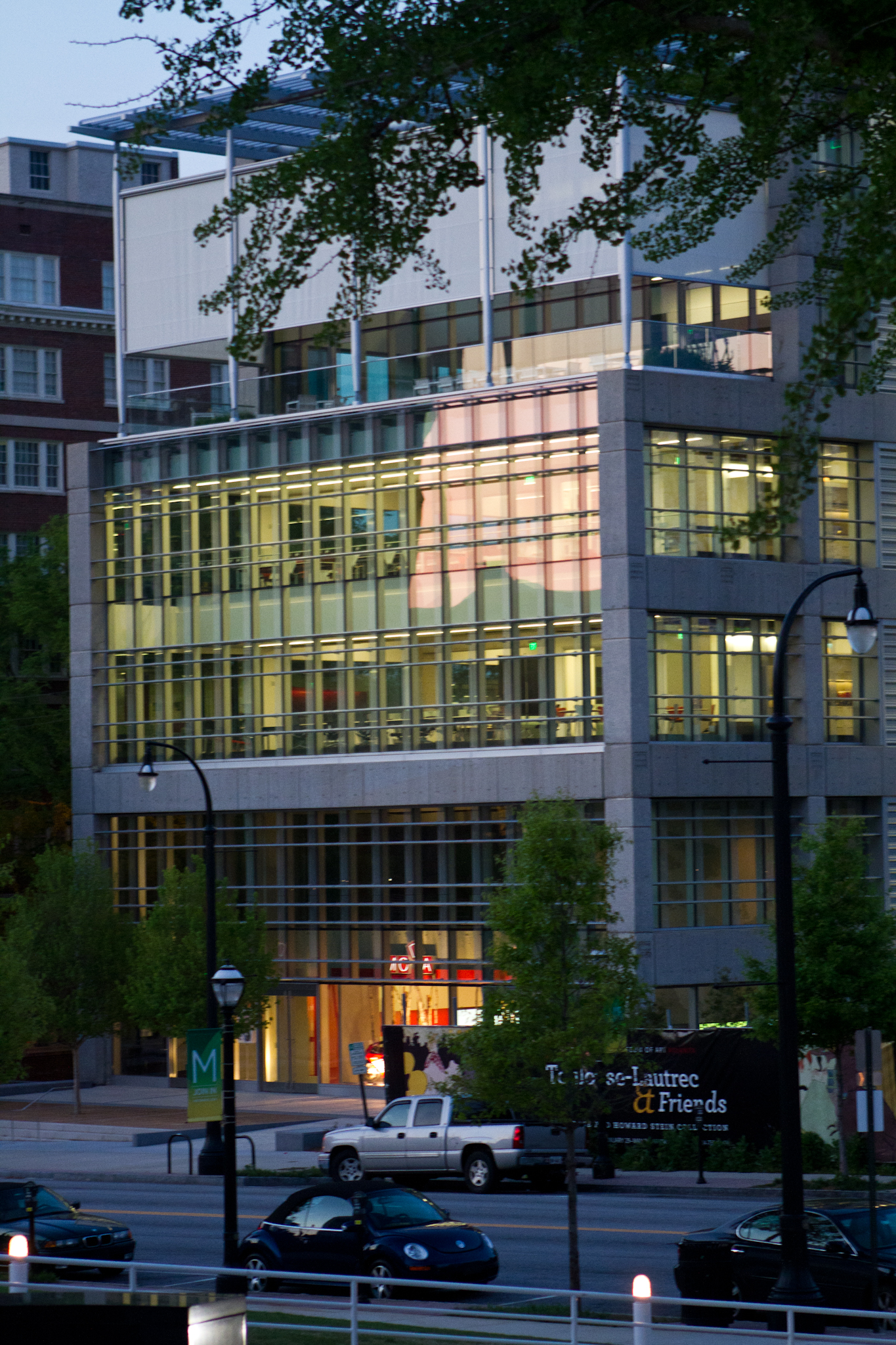
The Museum of Design Atlanta (MODA) is located on Peachtree Street.

Midtown's Piedmont Park is a popular venue for cultural festivals in Atlanta. Every spring, when the native dogwoods are in bloom in Piedmont Park, is the Atlanta Dogwood Festival, an arts and crafts fair. Piedmont Park is the finish line of the Peachtree Road Race, held annually on Independence Day. As ground zero for the Atlanta arts community, Midtown is home to the annual Atlanta Arts Festival, which brings artists from across the country to Piedmont Park. Piedmont Park is the home of the Southeast's largest multicultural festival, Festival Peachtree Latino, which celebrates Hispanic-American culture with arts and crafts, family activities, sporting events, a parade, dance demonstrations, ethnic foods, and a live music stage featuring international performers from Mexico, Puerto Rico, Colombia, Venezuela, and the Dominican Republic.

Midtown is the home of Atlanta's major music festival, Music Midtown, which was revived in 2011 after a five-year hiatus. At the corner of 8th Street and Spring Street, near the Midtown MARTA station, Midtown hosts the Peachtree Music Festival, a one-day, two-stage music festival blending indie rock bands with electronic DJs. In the fall, the Atlanta Pride festival attracts the LGBT local and regional community while the week-long Out on Film gay film festival highlights films by, for, and about the LGBT community.

== Education ==
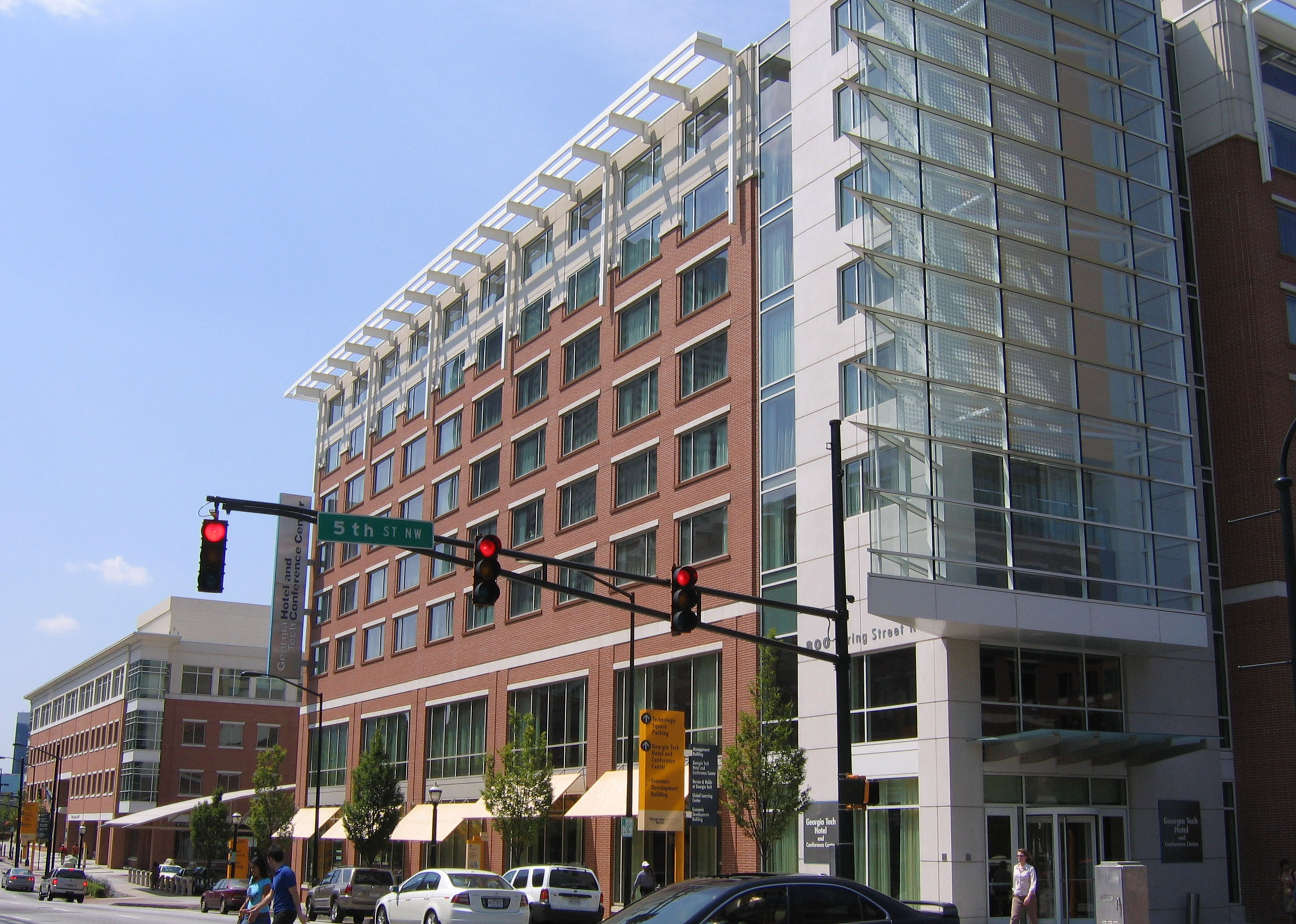
Midtown's Technology Square

Residents are zoned to schools in the Atlanta Public Schools.

- Virginia-Highland Elementary School (VHE)
- David T. Howard Middle School
- Midtown High School

In addition, the campuses of Georgia Institute of Technology, John Marshall Law School, and the Atlanta division of the Savannah College of Art and Design are located in Midtown.

== Transportation ==
Midtown Atlanta is served by Atlanta's rail rapid transit system, MARTA, at the North Avenue, Midtown, and Arts Center MARTA Stations. MARTA operates a significant bus service in the district. There is a free shuttle between the Arts Center MARTA Station and Atlantic Station, and a free-to-the-public daytime shuttle between the Midtown MARTA station and Georgia Tech.

== Midtown Ecodistrict ==
Ecodistricts are being implemented in leading cities around the world and Midtown has just completed a process to create Atlanta's first ecodistrict.

The Midtown Ecodistrict was created in 2012 as a platform for the community to collaborate on initiatives that results in improved environmental and economic performance. The program focuses on measurement on sustainability methods throughout the company. Green operational practices in the areas of energy, water, transportation and waste were implemented in an effort to make Midtown one of the most livable, vibrant and sustainable districts in the country.

In 2014, Midtown Alliance (who created the ecodistrict) decided to highlight business and buildings in Midtown that have made a significant commitment to green practices. This district is heavily urbanized (buildings, shops, skyscraper and hotels). Midtown also serves cyclists and pedestrians with 5 miles of bike lanes. The restaurants established in Midtown are recycling and composting at least 95% . 50 recycling cans have been installed.

== See also ==
- Midtown Mile
- 1010 Midtown
- The Varsity
- Junior's Grill
- First Presbyterian Church Of Atlanta
- Out on Film
- Atlanta Black Pride
- Opera Nightclub
- Margaret Mitchell House & Museum
- West Midtown
- Gentrification of Atlanta
