= Opera Nightclub =

Coordinates: 33.78593°N 84.38414°W

Opera Nightclub was a nightclub located in Midtown Atlanta, Georgia, United States. It was Atlanta's most popular and successful nightclub in terms of revenue and attendance and has also been featured in Nightclub & Bar's Top 50 Clubs in the United States for 2015.

The venue has been host to internationally renowned DJs including Armin van Buuren, Paul van Dyk, and Tiesto. Opera Nightclub had multiple environments and regularly hosted corporate and private events. The club contained a large dance floor, a VIP balcony area, a gallery, a large lounge, and an outside patio area. Opera Nightclub was located close to the Loews Atlanta Hotel and The W Midtown.

The club was a place for celebrity sightings such as Clint Eastwood. The nightclub also featured various celebrities, such as Pauly D from the reality television show Jersey Shore and rapper and actor Ice Cube.

Opera Nightclub was awarded the Best Nightclub Award for 2013 in Jezebel magazine. Along with Webster Hall in New York City, Opera Nightclub was nominated as one of the top three nightclubs in the United States by Nightclub and Bar Magazine in 2011.

== Building and club history ==
Formerly an actual opera house in the 1920s, Opera Nightclub was located at 1150 Crescent Avenue. It was an extension of the Atlanta Women's Club. After hosting the "Peachtree Playhouse" and then renovated and restored by Peter Gatien into the "infamous nightclub Petrus" in the 1990s, the building was host to another dance club, Axys, before the club was renovated in the early 2000s, to give the interior a look and feel of an opera house, and known as Eleven 50. It was again renovated in 2008 as Opera.

It was widely described as one of Atlanta's most popular nightclub in the 2010s.

Opera was closed in 2019 and a new music venue, called Domaine, opened.

== Controversy ==
In March 2011, Opera Nightclub filed a lawsuit against NBA superstar LeBron James. James was accused of failing to appear at the club, despite supposedly previously committing to visit the club for one hour for a fee of $25,000. James committed to visit the Gold Room, another club in Atlanta, instead. Opera Nightclub argued that "reputation is crucial to conducting … business at Opera and the public has an expectation that defendant James will appear at Opera." Despite tensions, however, two days later, Opera Nightclub dropped the suit against James. While the nightclub did not disclose the full details, they stated that the deal had been introduced by an agent who did not actually represent James.

== Notable musical performances ==
The place regularly hosted DJs and other musical performances. Notable appearances include:

- Prince (then Eleven 50)
- Dawn Richard (singer)
- Amol Mehta (DJ)
- Travis Barker
- Chuckie (DJ)
- Ferry Corsten
- The Crystal Method
- David Guetta
- Lil Jon
- LMFAO
- Jauz
- Pegboard Nerds
- Morgan Page
- Alison Wonderland
- Borgore
- Miike Snow
- Paul Okenfold
- Kanye West
