= 1100 Peachtree =

Building in Georgia, United States

Coordinates: 33.7848°N 84.3834°W

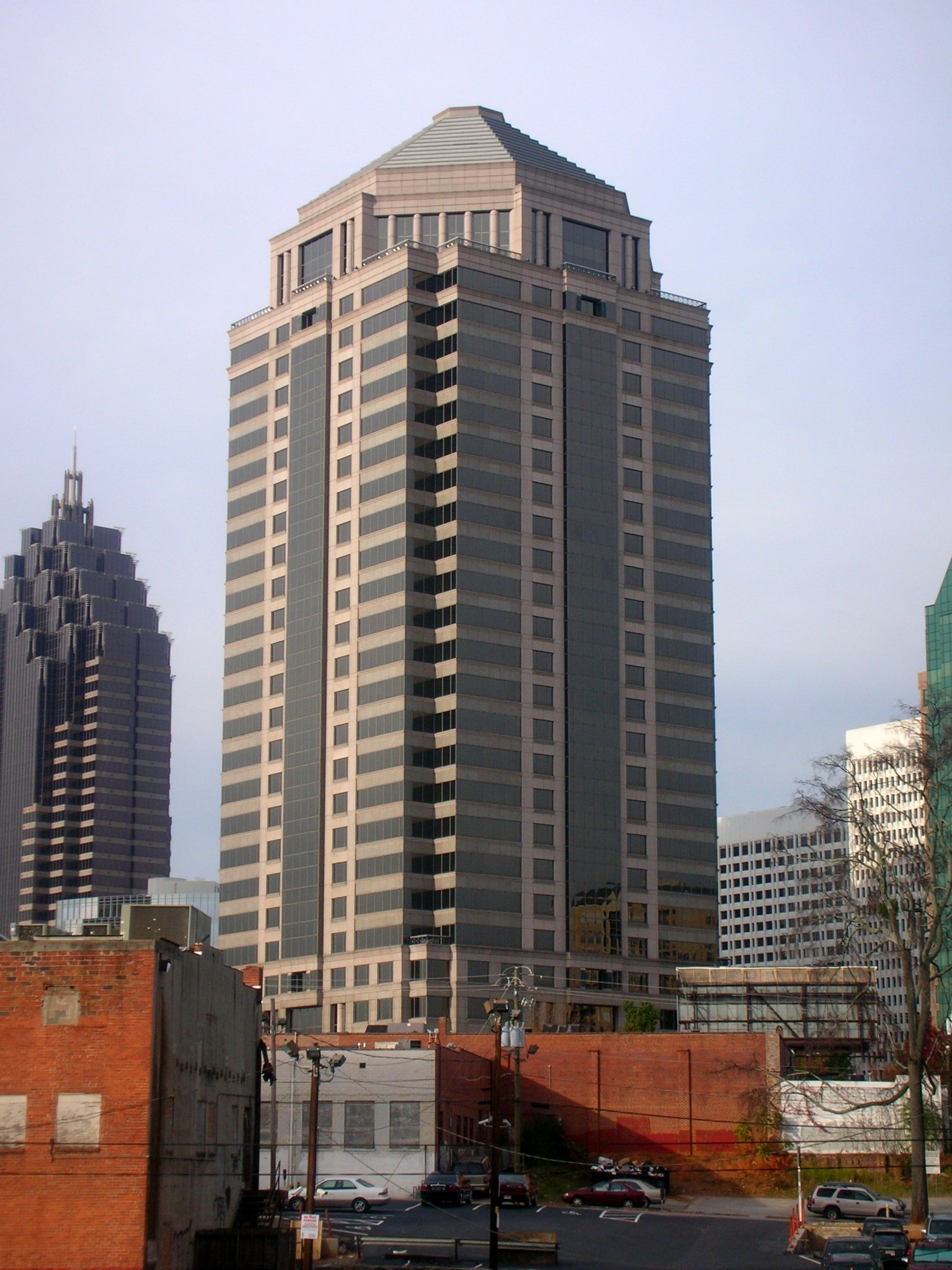
- 1100 Peachtree

General information
- Location: 1100 Peachtree St NE; Atlanta, Georgia, United States
- Completed: 1991

Height
- Roof: 428 ft (130 m)

Technical details
- Floor count: 28

Design and construction
- Architect: Smallwood, Reynolds, Stewart, Stewart & Associates, Inc.

1100 Peachtree Street is one of the prominent buildings of Midtown Atlanta, Georgia.

== Ownership and usage ==
The 28-story, 618,000 sq ft (57,414 m^{2}) building is currently owned by Manulife Financial. It was previously partly owned and largely occupied by telecommunications company AT&T Corporation providing offices for its top executives. In November 2006, law firm Schreeder, Wheeler and Flint, LLP became the building's tenants. Law firm Kilpatrick Townsend & Stockton LLP is the largest single tenant in the building, where it has operated for 30 years.

== Design ==
The octagonal building has a ziggurat-like, stair-stepped top with lighting which accentuates the building at night. Completed in 1991, the building is 428 ft (130 m) tall. It is one of several buildings built in a period in Atlanta in which architects apparently attempted to one-up each other with their ornate and dramatically lit "wedding-cake" skyscraper tops. 1100 Peachtree received the EPA "Energy Star" designation in 2000, the first high-rise in Atlanta to be so named. Building architects were Smallwood, Reynolds, Stewart, Stewart & Associates, Inc.

== See also ==
- List of tallest buildings in Atlanta
