= Peachtree Street =

Street in Georgia, US

- Peachtree Road, Peachtree Boulevard, Peachtree Industrial Boulevard
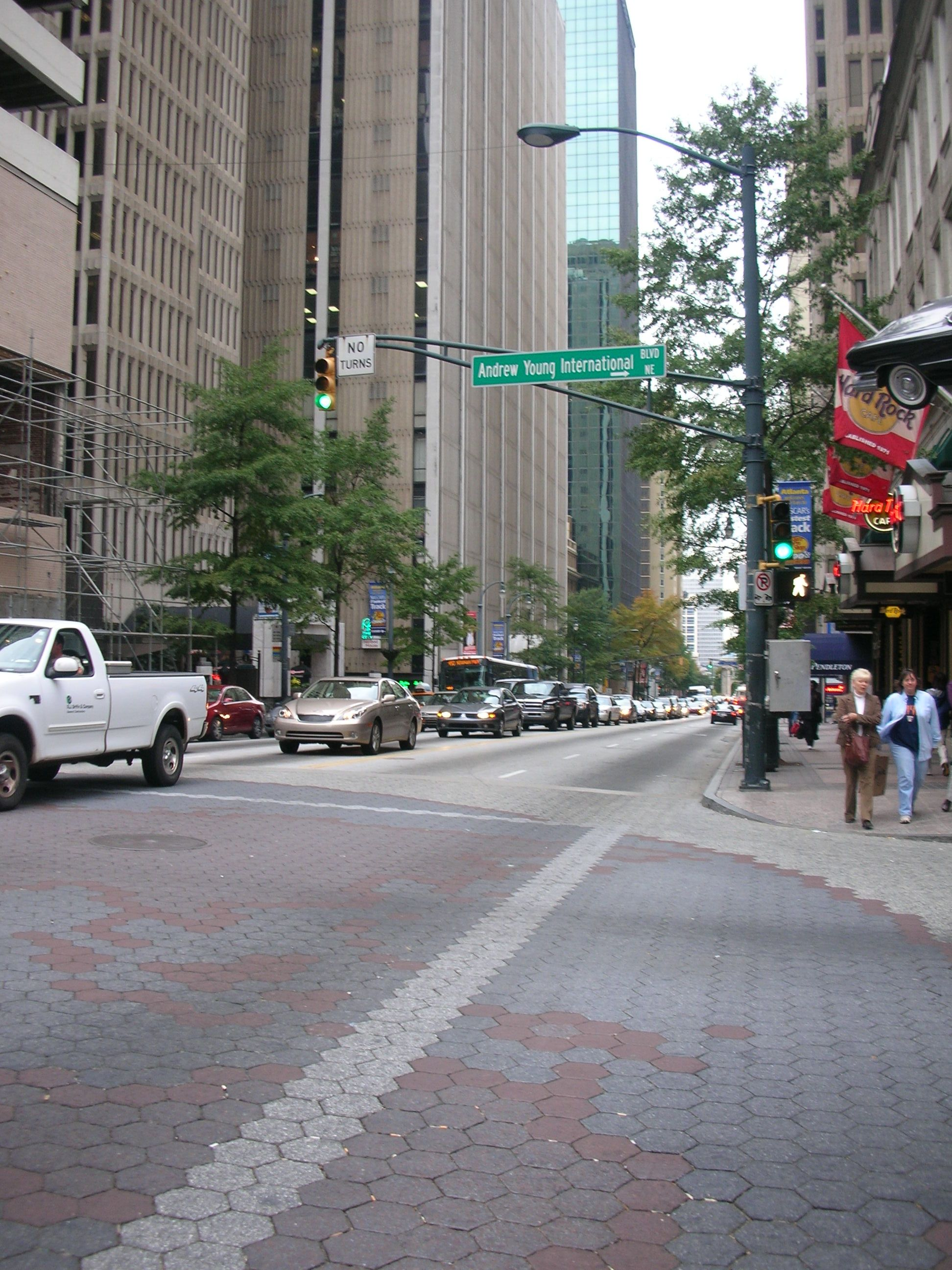
- Peachtree Street in downtown Atlanta
- Namesake: Standing Peachtree, named in turn for a peach tree or pine ("pitch") tree
- Length: 18.02 mi (29.00 km)
- Component highways: US 19 between Midtown and Buckhead; SR 9 between Midtown and Buckhead; SR 141 between Buckhead and Doraville
- South end: Memorial Drive SW / Cooper Street SW / Whitehall Street SW / Forsyth Street SW in South Downtown, Atlanta
- Major junctions: SR 154 in South Downtown, Atlanta; US 29 / US 78 / US 278 / SR 8 on the Downtown–Midtown Atlanta neighborhood line; US 19 / SR 9 in Midtown Atlanta; US 19 / SR 9 / SR 141 in Buckhead, Atlanta; SR 237 in Buckhead, Atlanta; SR 141 in Chamblee
- North end: SR 141 in Doraville

Peachtree Street is one of several major streets running through the city of Atlanta, Georgia, United States. Beginning at Five Points in downtown Atlanta, it runs North through Midtown; a few blocks after entering into Buckhead, the name changes to Peachtree Road at Palisades Road. Much of the city's historic and noteworthy architecture is located along the street, and it is often used for annual parades, (such as the Atlanta St. Patrick's Day Parade and Atlanta Christmas Parade), as well as one-time parades celebrating events such as the 100th anniversary of Coca-Cola in 1986 and the Atlanta Braves' 1995 and 2021 World Series victories.

== History ==
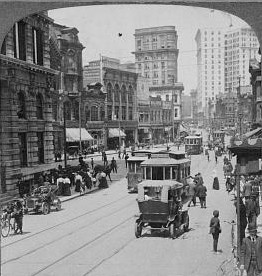
Peachtree Street in 1907, carrying streetcar, horse, and automobile traffic.

Atlanta grew on a site occupied by the Creek people, which included a major village called Standing Peachtree. There is some dispute over whether the Creek settlement was called Standing Peachtree or Standing Pitch Tree, corrupted later to peach.

A trail known as the Peachtree Trail stretched from northeast Georgia to Standing Pitch Tree along the Chattahoochee River. The original Peachtree Road began in 1812 at Fort Daniel located at Hog Mountain in present-day Gwinnett County and ran along the course of the trail to the Chattahoochee. Some portions of the present road trace this route.

After the American Civil War a shantytown named Tight Squeeze developed at Peachtree at what is now 10th Street in Midtown Atlanta. It was infamous for vagrancy, desperation, and robberies of merchants transiting the settlement.

In 1867, the name of Whitehall Street, the original road to White Hall Tavern in today's West End neighborhood, was changed to Peachtree Street from Marietta Street south to the railroad crossing (now "gulch") just north of Alabama Street. Later in the 1980s, the portion of Whitehall Street from Five Points south to Forsyth Street and Memorial Drive, a major shopping district from the Civil War through mid-20th century, was renamed Peachtree Street SE.

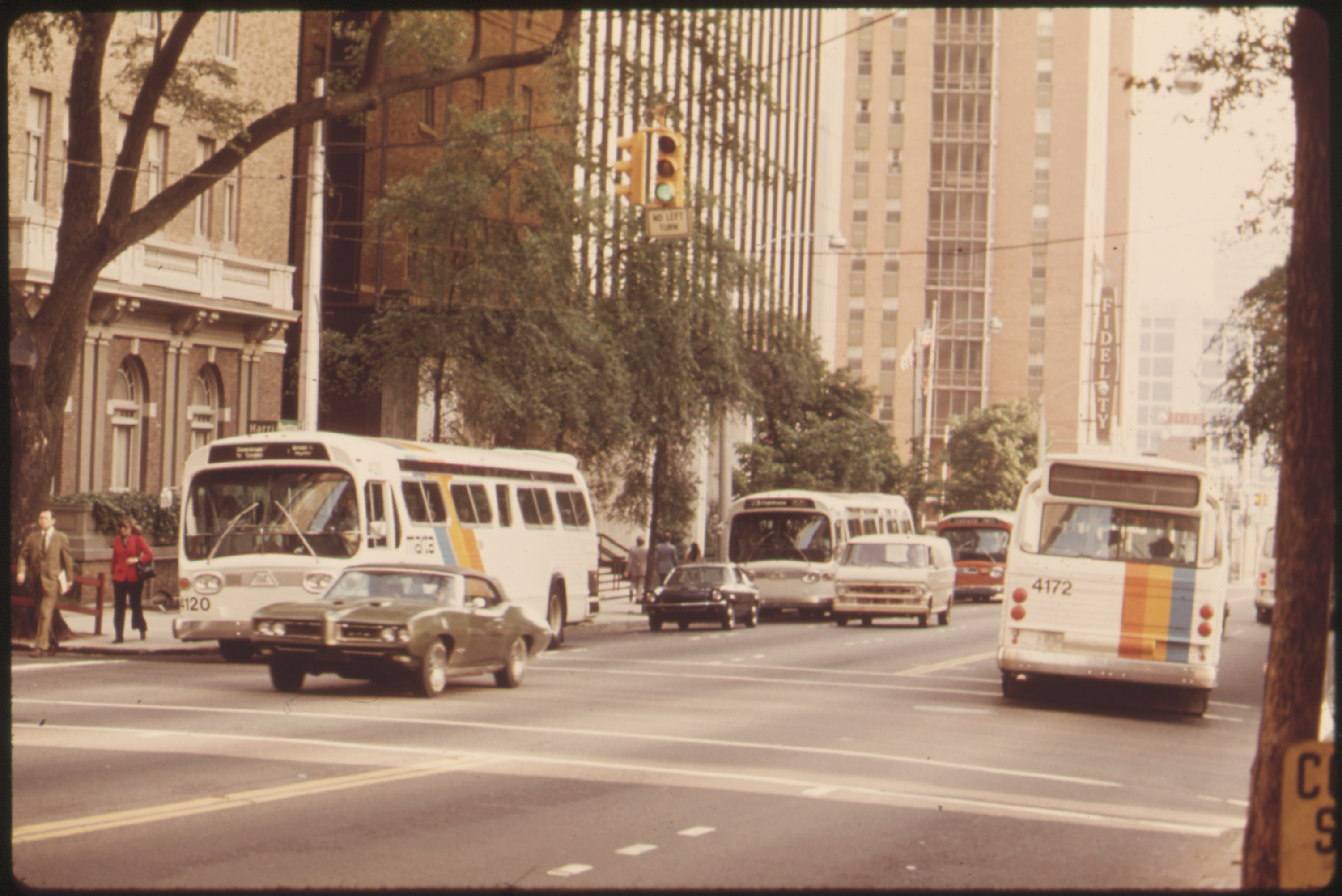
Peachtree Street, downtown Atlanta, 1974

In 2007, Atlanta mayor Shirley Franklin unveiled a $1 billion, 20-year plan to transform Peachtree Street with streetscape upgrades, public parks, buried utilities, and the addition of a streetcar, based on a sixteen-month study by the Peachtree Corridor Partnership task force.

== Nomenclature ==
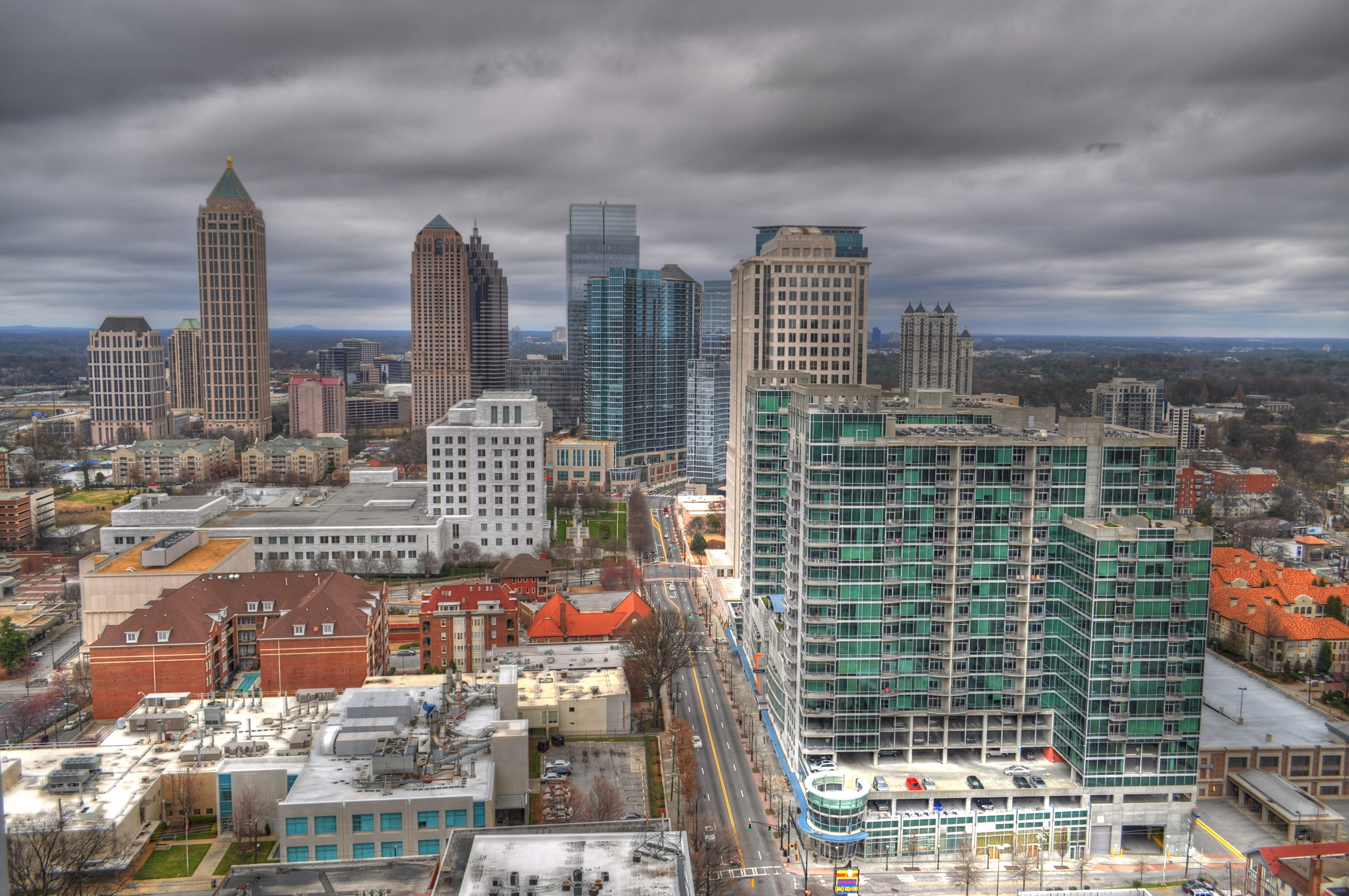
Peachtree Street as it travels through Midtown

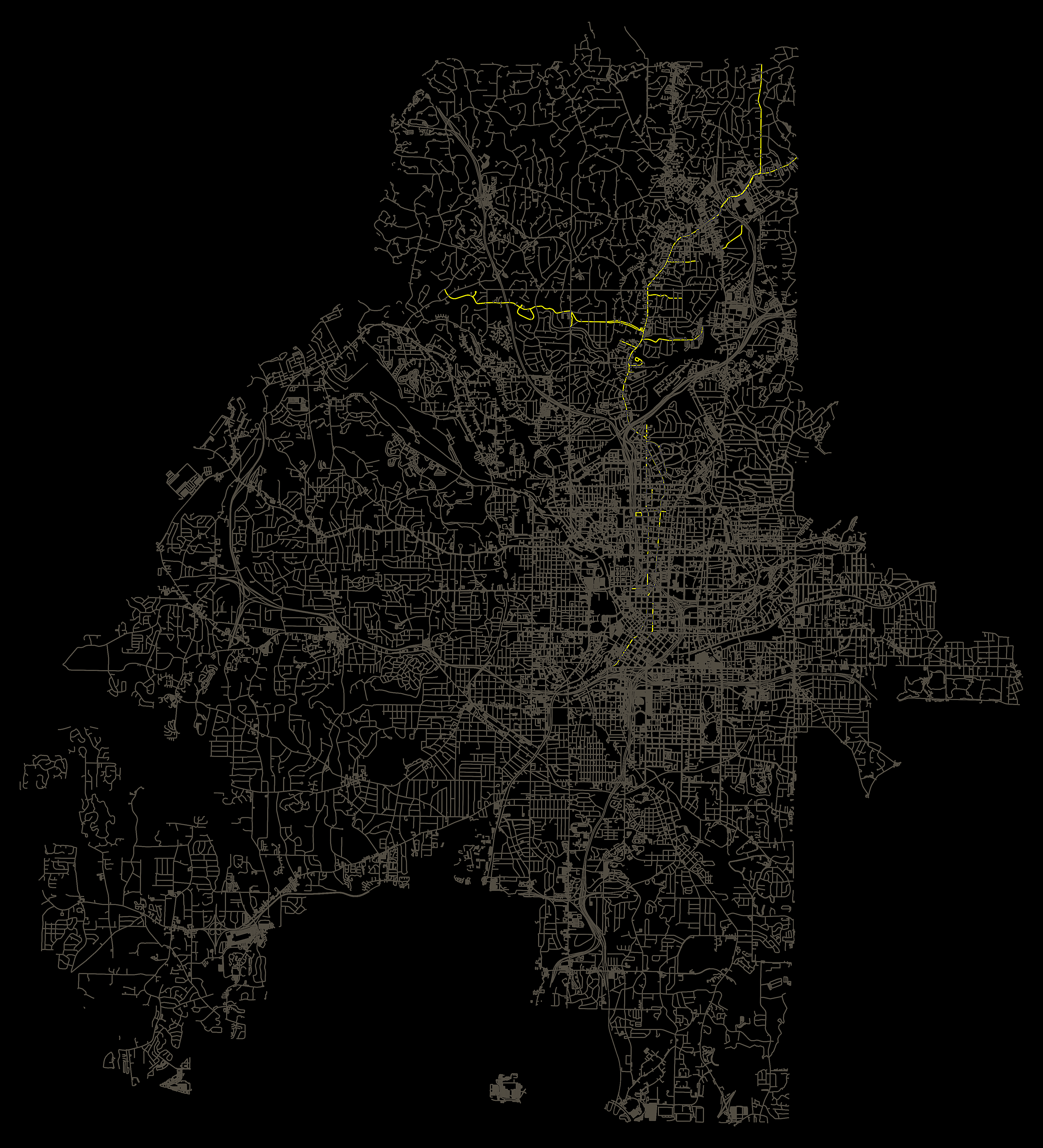
Atlanta streets with some variant of "Peachtree" highlighted

The Peachtree name is common throughout the Atlanta area. In fact, it is often joked by natives that half of the streets in Atlanta are named Peachtree, and the other half have five names to make up for it. While “Peachtree” alone almost always refers to this street or its continuations, there are 71 streets in Atlanta with a variant of “Peachtree” in their name. Some include:

- Peachtree Creek Road
- Peachtree Lane
- Peachtree Avenue
- Peachtree Circle
- Peachtree Place
- Peachtree Drive
- Peachtree Plaza
- Peachtree Way
- Peachtree Memorial Drive
- New Peachtree Road
- Peachtree Walk
- Peachtree Park Drive
- Peachtree Parkway
- Peachtree Valley Road
- Peachtree Battle Avenue (commemorating the Battle of Peachtree Creek)
- Peachtree Dunwoody Road (running between Peachtree Street and Dunwoody, Georgia)
- Old Peachtree Road (traces part of the route of the original Peachtree Trail for which the road is named; in Gwinnett County.)

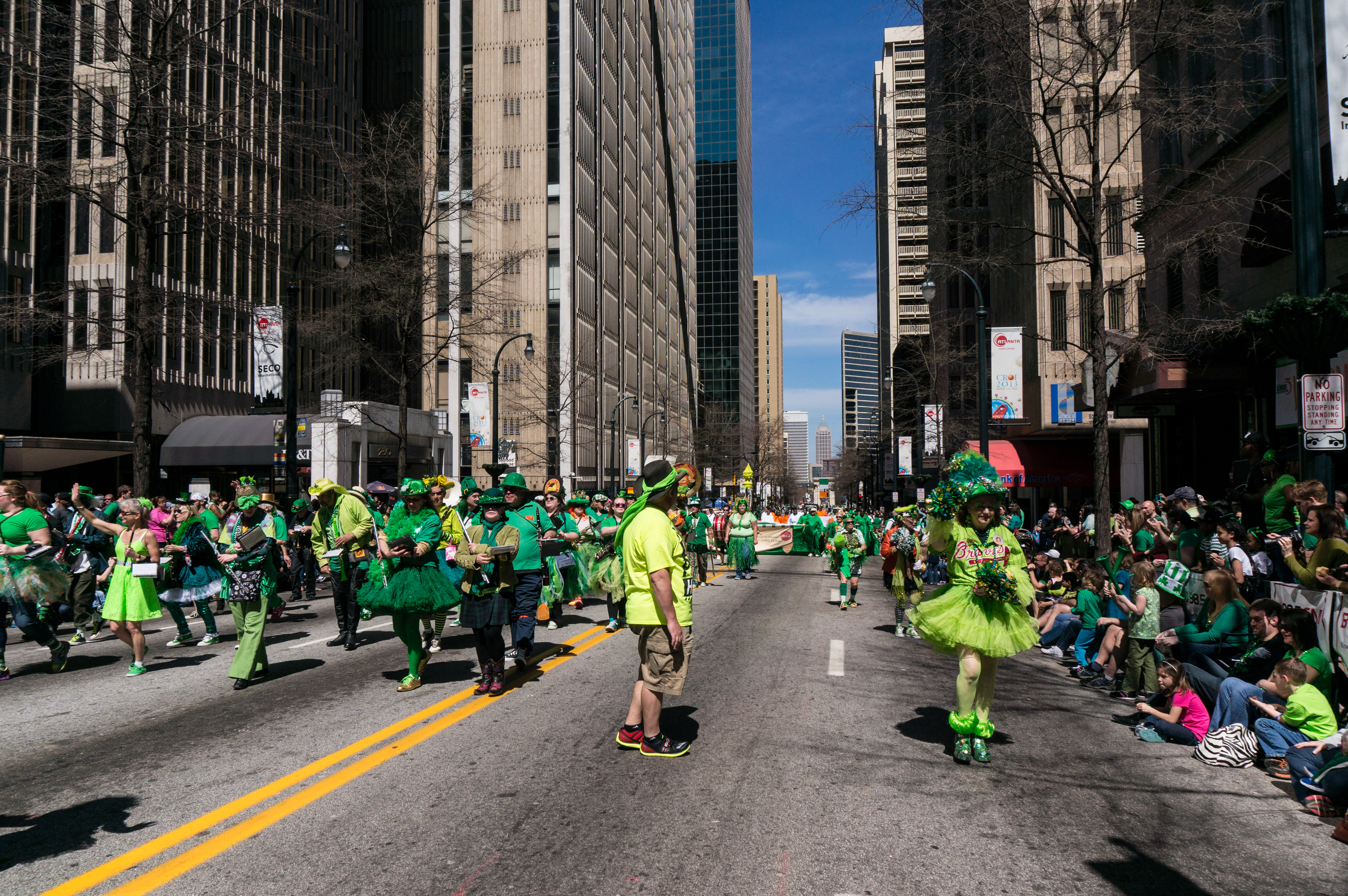
Atlanta St. Patrick's Day Parade on Peachtree Street, 2013

Peachtree is also seen in place names:

- Peachtree Center is a major development of skyscrapers and other high-rises in downtown, with Peachtree Center Avenue running a block east of Peachtree Street.
- Peachtree City is a planned-suburb golf community located south of the city, in Fayette County.
- Peachtree Corners is also a planned suburb located north of the city, in Gwinnett County.

=== West Peachtree Street ===
West Peachtree Street is not a western branch of Peachtree Street, but a major parallel (and unlike Peachtree, almost perfectly straight) due north–south street running one block west of Peachtree Street through downtown, and mostly two or three blocks west (due to the curves in Peachtree Street) through Midtown. West Peachtree divides the northeast and northwest quadrants of the city and county for street addressing purposes.

In 2026, West Peachtree was changed from NW to NE.

Where the current Peachtree Street turns to Peachtree Road and briefly heads northwest, it actually crosses West Peachtree, leaving it on the "east" side. It is at this point that the Buford-Spring Connector (Georgia 13) begins, taking the route of old I-85. The studios of WSB-TV are located on this section of “West” Peachtree Street, which terminates at I-85. The MARTA Red/Gold lines run directly under West Peachtree Street. The Civic Center MARTA Station is located under West Peachtree street where the road crosses the Downtown Connector (I-75/85) The station is notable as it is among a very small number of subway stations in the world that are simultaneously above a highway and below street level.

The intersection of the two Peachtree streets in downtown form Hardy Ivy Park, while in midtown, the intersection forms Pershing Point Park.

== Route numbers ==
From the Buford–Spring Connector north to Roswell Road, Peachtree Street and Peachtree Road carry U.S. Route 19 (US 19) and State Route 9 (SR 9). At a five-way intersection with East/West Paces Ferry Road at the center of the original Buckhead Village, US 19 and SR 9 split off onto Roswell Road, while SR 141 begins on Peachtree instead. South of the connector, US 19 and SR 9 continue on two one-way streets: West Peachtree Street northbound and Spring Street southbound.

Peachtree meets Piedmont Road (SR 237) between Buckhead Village and Lenox Square. Besides the southwestern terminus of SR 13 (mentioned above) the only other major intersection in Atlanta is at North Avenue, which carries US 29, US 78, US 278, and SR 8.

There are no direct highway interchanges from Peachtree to the Downtown Connector (I-75/I-85), I-85 itself, or SR 400 freeways, all of which it crosses.

== Landmarks ==
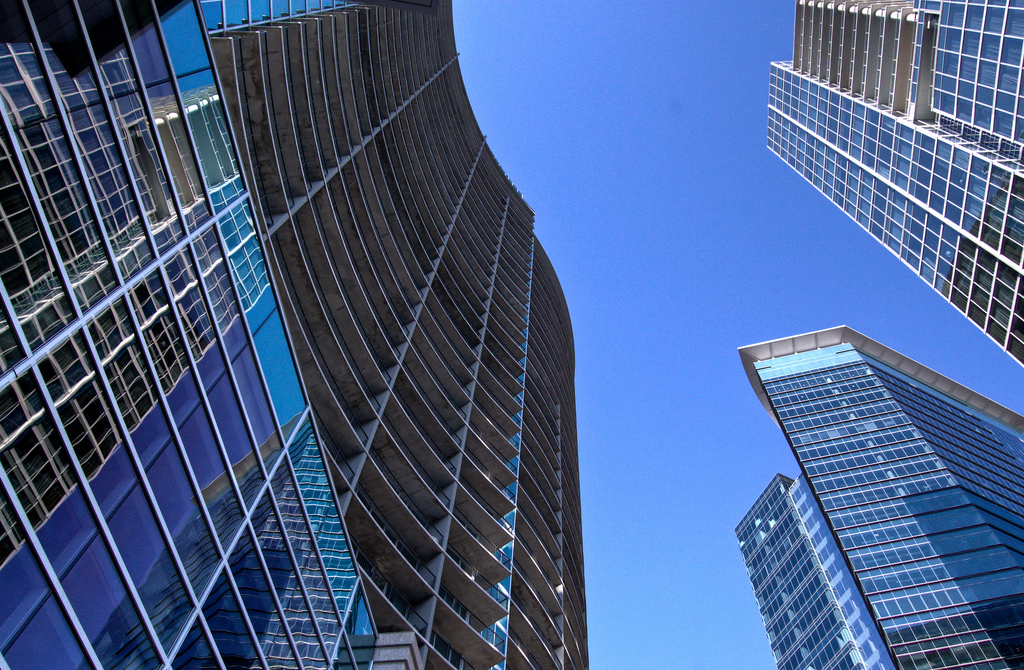
Modern glass structures on Peachtree Street in Midtown

Many of Atlanta's most prominent buildings and landmarks are located along Peachtree Street. In downtown, 191 Peachtree Tower, Georgia-Pacific Tower, Westin Peachtree Plaza and SunTrust Plaza all line Peachtree. In Midtown, Bank of America Plaza, Atlanta's tallest building, is a block south of the "Fabulous" Fox Theatre, a grand movie palace completed in 1929.

Author Margaret Mitchell was killed by a speeding car in 1949 while crossing Peachtree Street as a pedestrian at the intersection with 13th Street. Mitchell wrote her classic Gone With the Wind in the basement apartment of a boarding house at the corner of 10th Street and Peachtree Street. That house is now a museum and is located across 10th Street from the Federal Reserve Bank of Atlanta which serves the southeastern United States. The film debuted at the Loew's Grand Theatre, at the corner of Peachtree and Forsyth Street, where the Georgia-Pacific Building now stands.

Office buildings 1100 Peachtree (formerly owned and occupied by BellSouth) and 1180 Peachtree, home to major law firms, are prominent business addresses. The heart of Atlanta's arts scene is found just north on Peachtree where the Woodruff Arts Center, including the High Museum of Art, Atlanta Symphony, Alliance Theatre Company, and the Atlanta campus of the Savannah College of Art & Design are located.

Although most have been demolished, there are still several historic buildings left along Peachtree in Buckhead. Several of these are stores, in single-story brick buildings constructed well before the annexation of Buckhead in 1952.

Northeast of the city limit, the road goes through Brookhaven and passes Oglethorpe University. Upon entering Chamblee, the road splits into Peachtree Industrial Boulevard and Peachtree Road. Peachtree Road becomes a two-lane road that travels farther east towards Doraville, while Peachtree Industrial Boulevard continues more on a more northerly trajectory (as Georgia 141) towards Dunwoody and Peachtree Corners.

== Retail ==
The Buckhead shopping district features many high-end retailers, concentrated in the Phipps Plaza and Lenox Square malls. Buckhead Atlanta (formerly "Streets of Buckhead") is a mixed-use development that opened in 2014. The "Midtown Mile" was a concept to make part of Peachtree in Midtown like the Magnificent Mile in Chicago.

== Geography ==
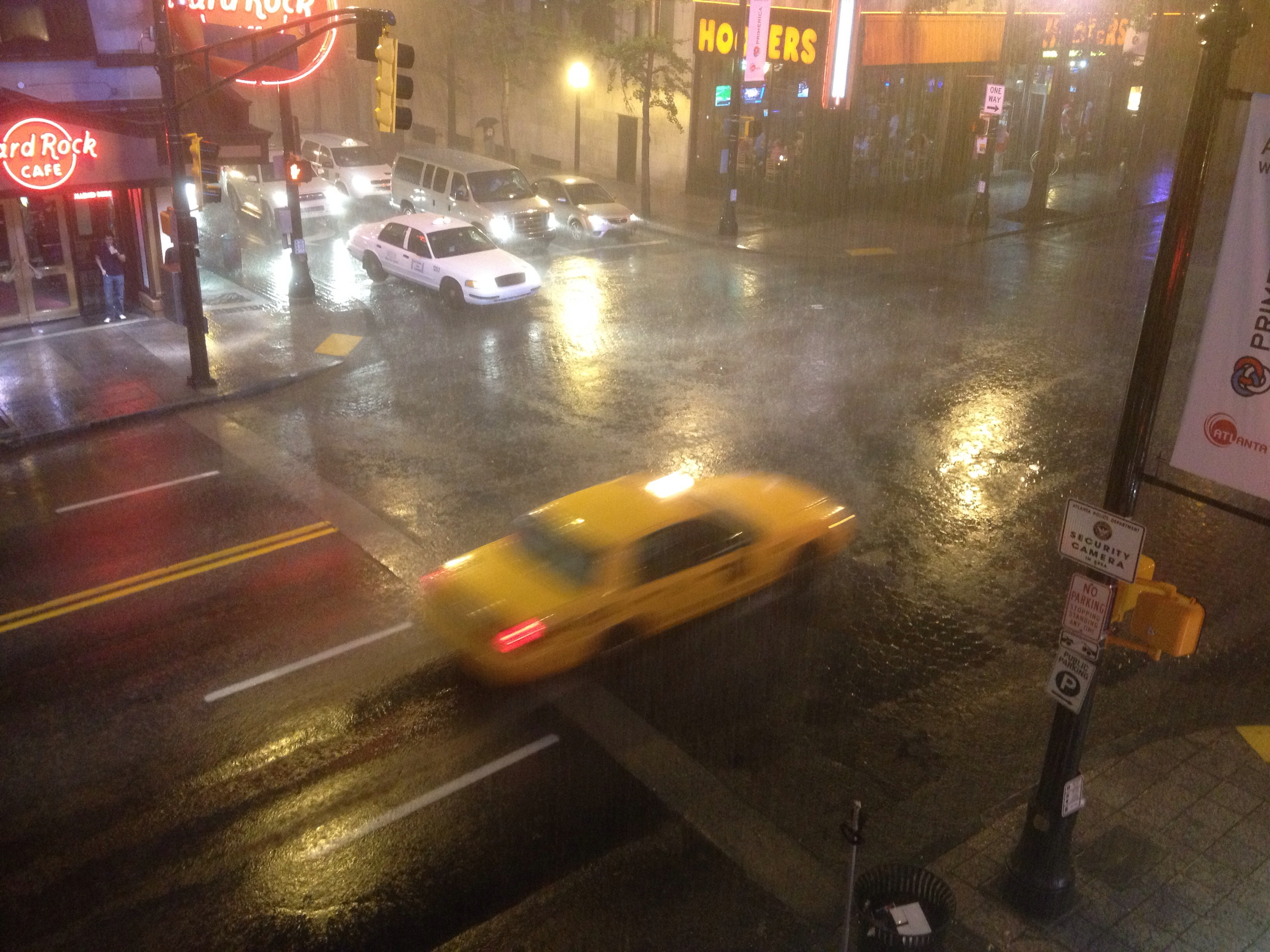
Peachtree Street in downtown Atlanta during a rainstorm

Atlantans are often convinced that the ridge followed by Peachtree Street is part of the Eastern Continental Divide. While Peachtree Street is atop a ridge, railroad tracks were built on the actual Eastern Continental Divide, which follows DeKalb Avenue from Decatur to Five Points, then turns southwest toward the Atlanta airport, with the northwest side draining into the Chattahoochee or Flint Rivers and therefore into the Gulf of Mexico, and the southeast side eventually into the Atlantic Ocean. In 1959, Whitehall Street SW, which meets Peachtree Street NE at Five Points, was renamed "Peachtree Street SW", and the Eastern Continental Divide follows this street, so a small portion of the story may be technically correct. Atlanta's primary water source is the Chattahoochee and much of the water is pumped over the watershed. To balance the river flows, treated sewage is pumped back to the Chattahoochee.

== In popular culture ==
- In Margaret Mitchell's epic Civil War romance Gone With the Wind, Scarlett O'Hara lives on various points of Peachtree Street along the novel. Coincidentally, it is also where the author herself was struck by a speeding automobile in Midtown, causing her death.
- Frank Sinatra co-wrote a song with Jimmy Saunders and Leni Mason called "Peachtree Street" in 1950. He recorded it as a duet with Rosemary Clooney.
- Sir Elton John kept a home on Peachtree Road in Buckhead, for which his 2004 album Peachtree Road was named, from 1991 to 2023.
- John Mayer references Peachtree Street in his song "Neon."

== Gallery ==
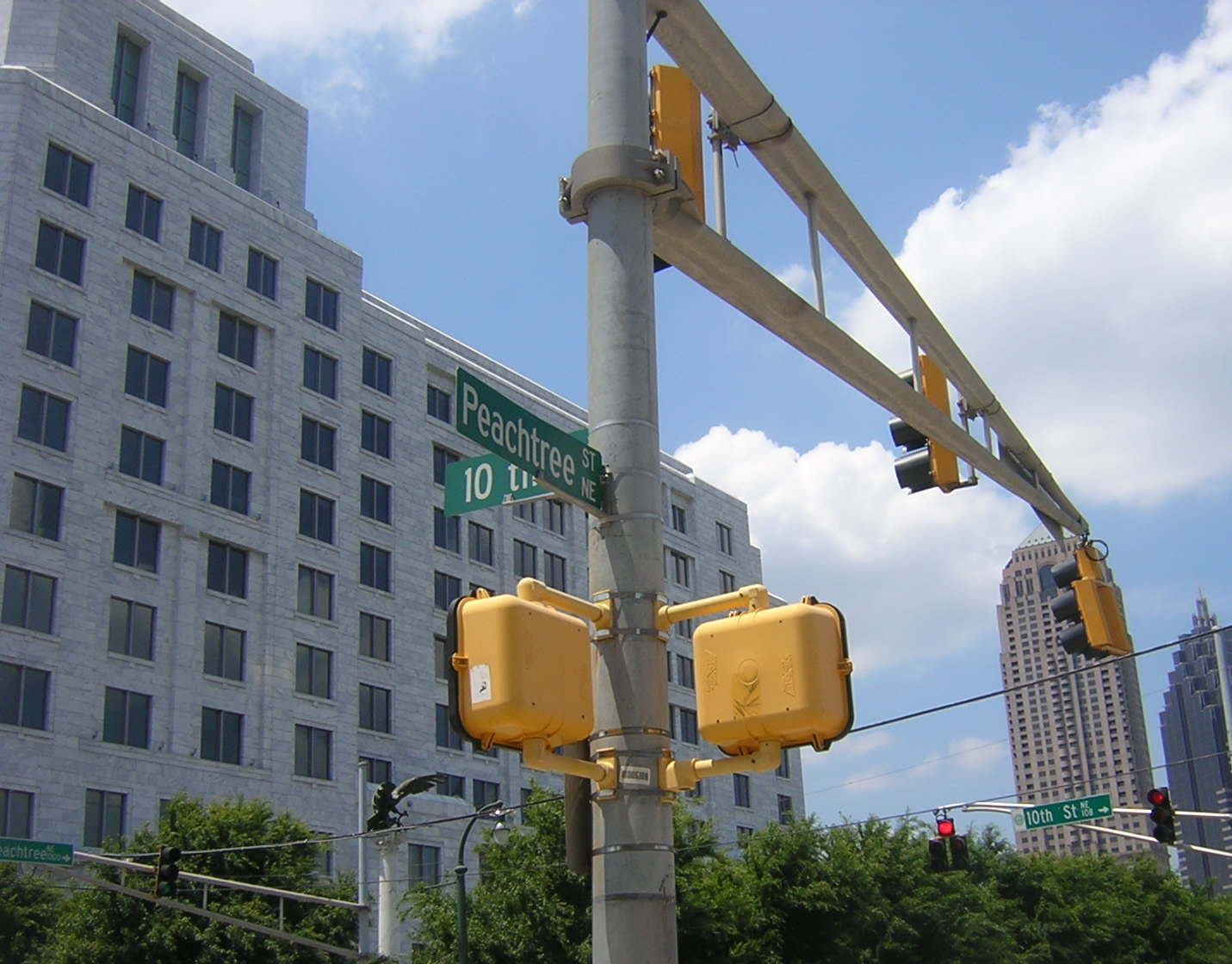
Peachtree and 10th at the Federal Reserve Bank of Atlanta

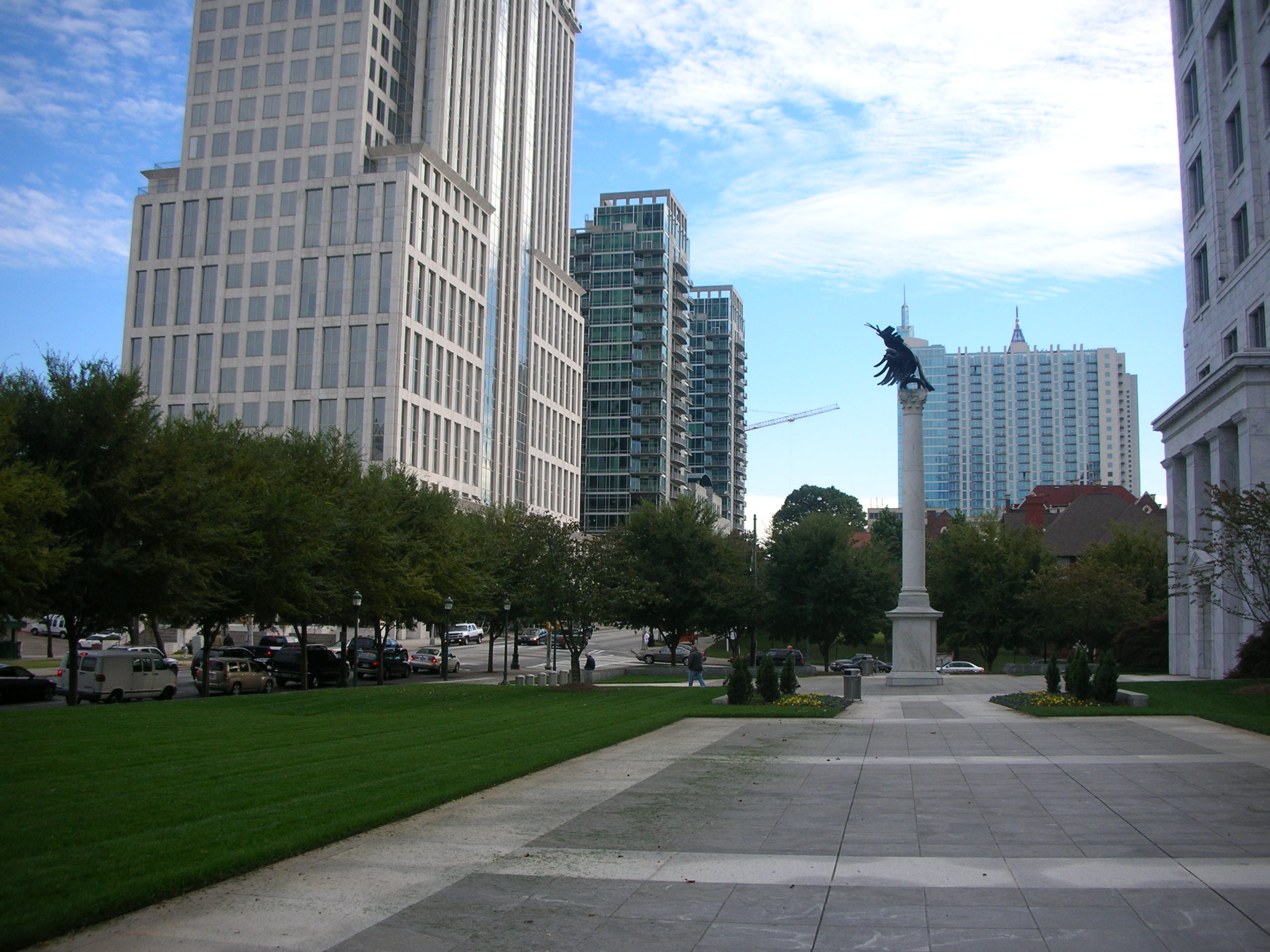
View of Peachtree from Federal Reserve

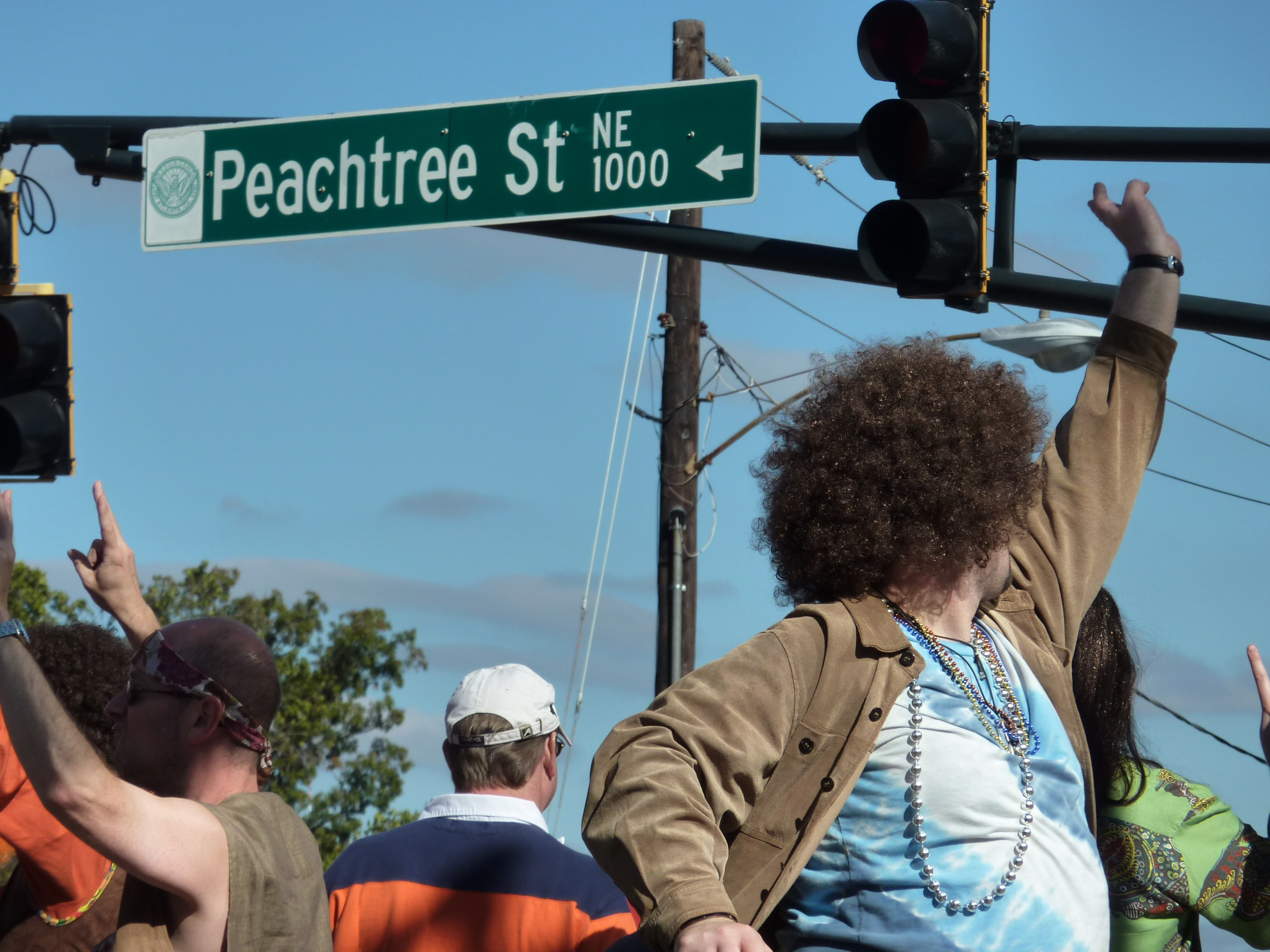
People celebrating on Peachtree Street

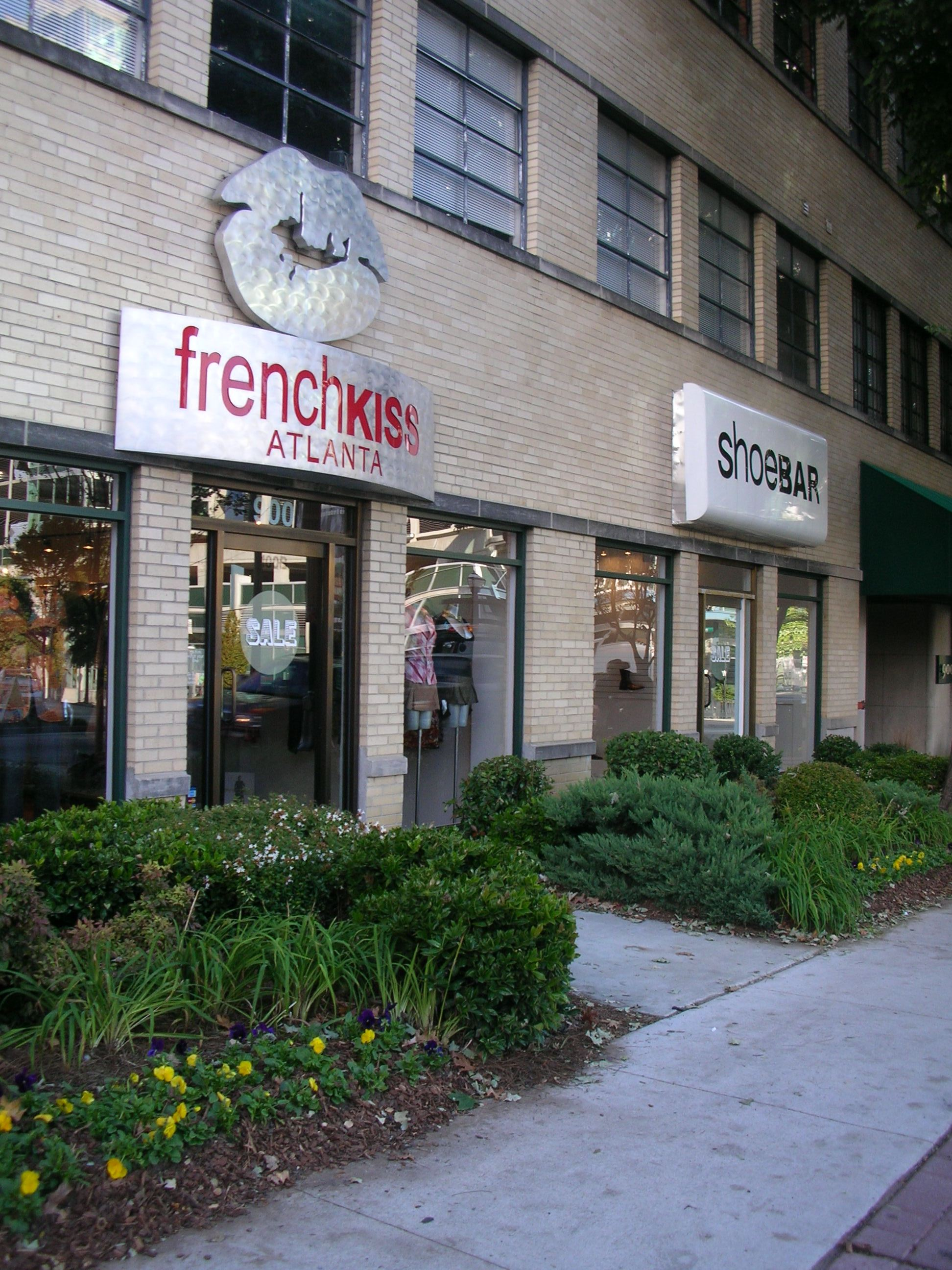
An example of shopping on Peachtree Street

== See also ==
- Downtown Atlanta
- Midtown Atlanta
- Brookwood Hills
- Atlanta Streetcar
