= Home Park, Atlanta =

Neighborhood of Atlanta, Georgia, US

Coordinates: 33.784864°N 84.399441°W

Home Park
- Neighborhood
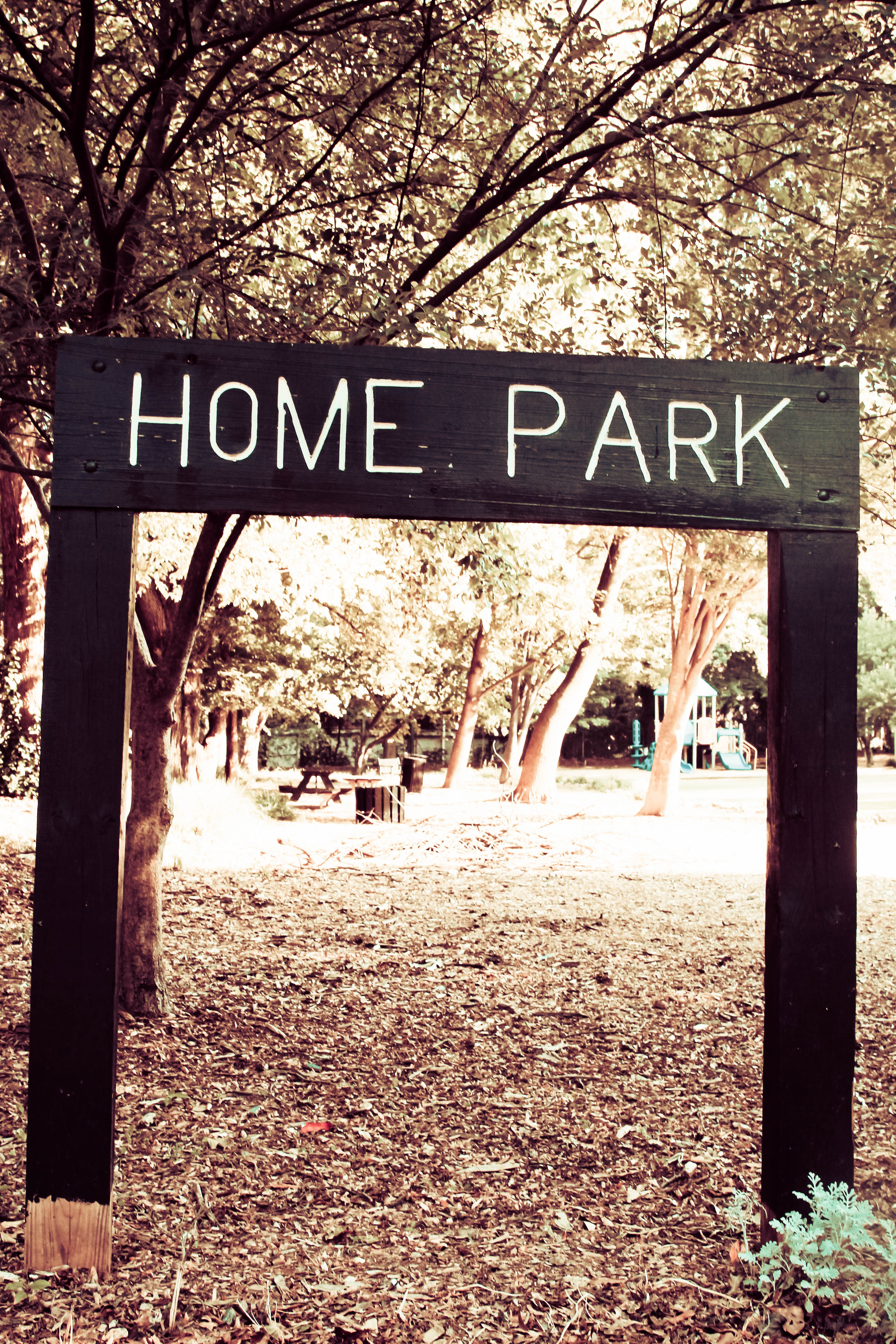
- Home Park
- Interactive map of Home Park
- Country: United States
- State: Georgia
- City: City of Atlanta
- NPU: E

Area
  - Total: 450 acres (180 ha)
- Source: Home Park Studio Report
- Website: homepark.org

Home Park is a neighborhood in Midtown Atlanta, Georgia, United States. It is bordered on the south by Georgia Tech, on the west by the railroad yards adjacent to Marietta Street and Brady Avenue, on the north by 16th Street at Atlantic Station, and on the east by Techwood Drive at I-75/85 (the Downtown Connector).

The neighborhood is known as West Midtown Atlanta since it lies on the west side of the Downtown Connector.

The residential district is bordered by Northside Drive, Techwood Drive, 10th Street, and 16th Street. This section is also home to the media organizations WANF, Georgia Public Broadcasting and Turner Broadcasting System.

The commercial district is west of Northside Drive over to Marietta Street and Brady Avenue. It has retail and services, design firms, art galleries, restaurants and an expanding residential section along Howell Mill Road.

== History ==
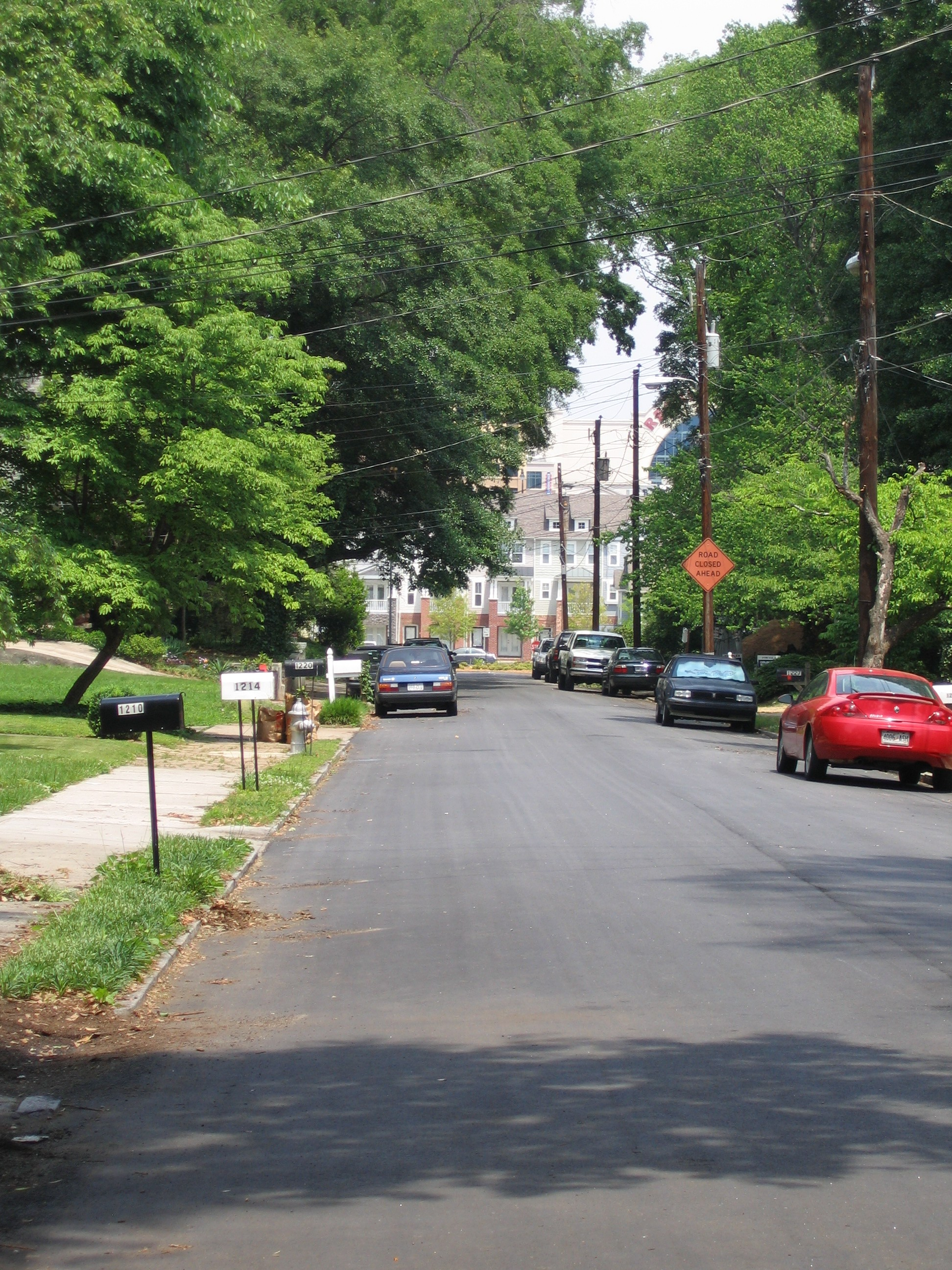
A street in north Home Park, with Atlantic Station in the background.

Home Park was developed in 1901 as housing for workers at the Atlantic Steel Mill located where Atlantic Station is today.

In 1970, Georgia Tech began expanding its campus north to Tenth Street and west to Northside Drive by purchasing and converting blocks of Home Park residential property for institutional use. During the 1970s and 1980s, the rapidly expanding student population exceeded campus dormitory capacity.

Over time and due to the schools' close proximity, it developed a large student population, being a popular alternative to on-campus housing at nearby institutions Georgia Tech and Georgia State University, resulting in a low owner-occupancy rate.

The neighborhood experienced an increase in property values and land development when Atlantic Station was built. The neighborhood's commercial district experienced a corresponding growth in restaurants, retail, art galleries, services and an expanding residential base.

== Parks and recreation ==
The Home Park neighborhood has two public parks, the eponymous Home Park and Holly Street Park. Home Park was constructed in 1958 and originally had a community center. It is 1.8 acres (0.73 ha) and has a playground and basketball court. Holly Street Park was purchased in 2017 but has not been developed into an official park yet.

== Businesses ==
The southeast corner of Fourteenth Street (Georgia 9 and U.S. 19) and Holly Street is the headquarters for Georgia Public Broadcasting. independent TV station WANF is located at 425 14th Street at Mecaslin. Turner Broadcasting System's Entertainment Group is located at 1050 Techwood Drive on the east side of Home Park.

== Education ==
There are no public schools in Home Park. However, it is served by Atlanta Public Schools, with students being zoned to Centennial Place Academy (grades K-8), and Midtown High School (grades 9-12).
