= Anne Focke =

Anne Focke may refer to:

- Anne Focke (arts organizer), founder of and/or alternative space, an exhibition, project, and performance space
- Anne Bosworth Focke (1868–1907), American mathematician
- Anne Daubenspeck-Focke (1922–2021), German sculptor and painter
