= The New York Times Building =

Office skyscraper in Manhattan, New York

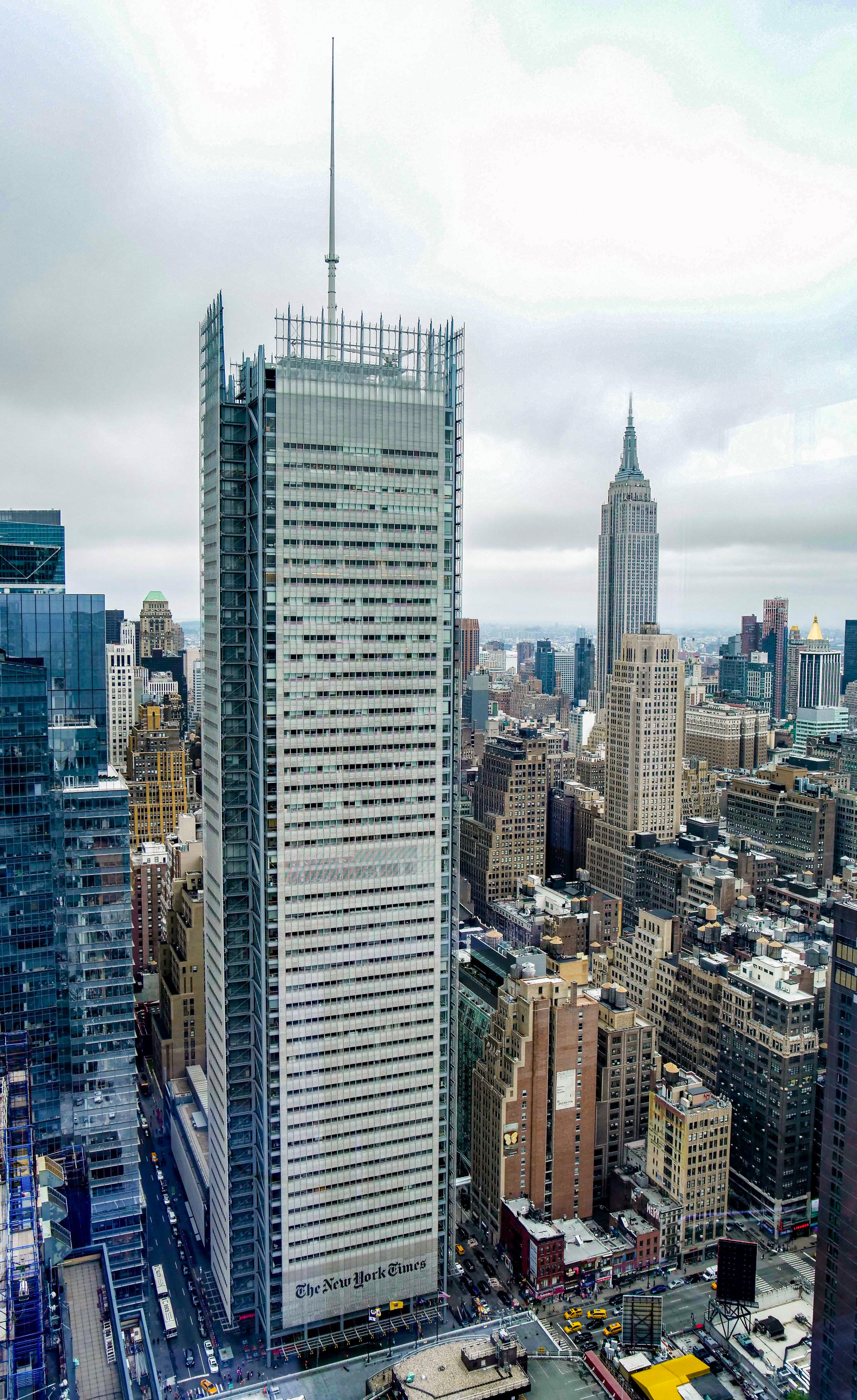
- The west façade of the building in 2019, with the Empire State Building standing beyond (both in Midtown Manhattan)

General information
- Type: Office, retail
- Location: 620 Eighth Avenue, Manhattan, New York, United States
- Coordinates: 40°45′22″N 73°59′24″W
- Construction started: August 23, 2004
- Completed: June 12, 2007
- Cost: US$1 billion
- Owner: New York City Economic Development Corporation
- Operator: The New York Times Company (58%); Brookfield Properties (42%)

Height
- Architectural: 1,046 ft (319 m)
- Roof: 748 ft (228 m)
- Top floor: 721 ft (220 m)

Technical details
- Floor count: 52
- Floor area: 1,545,708 sq ft (143,601.0 m^{2})
- Lifts/elevators: 32 (24 passenger, 8 service)

Design and construction
- Architects: Renzo Piano Building Workshop, FXFOWLE Architects
- Developer: The New York Times Company, Forest City Ratner, ING Real Estate
- Structural engineer: Thornton Tomasetti
- Main contractor: AMEC Construction Management

Website
- Official website

The New York Times Building is a 52-story skyscraper at 620 Eighth Avenue, between 40th and 41st Streets near Times Square, on the west side of Midtown Manhattan in New York City, New York, U.S. Its chief tenant is the New York Times Company, publisher of The New York Times. The building is 1,046 ft (318.8 m) tall to its pinnacle, with a roof height of 748 ft (228 m). Designed by Renzo Piano and Fox & Fowle, the building was developed by the New York Times Company, Forest City Ratner, and ING Real Estate. The interiors are divided into separate ownership units, with the New York Times Company operating the lower office floors and Brookfield Properties operating the upper floors. As of 2025, the New York Times Building is tied with the Chrysler Building as the thirteenth-tallest building in the city.

The building is cruciform in plan and has a steel-framed superstructure with a braced mechanical core. It consists of the office tower on the west side of the land lot as well as four-story podium on the east side. Its facade is largely composed of a glass curtain wall, in front of which are ceramic rods that deflect heat and glare. The steel framing and bracing is exposed at the four corner "notches" of the building. The New York Times Building is designed as a green building. The lower stories have a lobby, retail space, and the Times newsroom surrounding an enclosed garden. The other stories are used as office space.

During the 1980s and 1990s, the city and state governments of New York proposed a merchandise mart for the site as part of a wide-ranging redevelopment of Times Square. In 1999, the New York Times Company offered to develop its new headquarters on the mart's site. Piano and Fox & Fowle were selected following an architectural design competition, and the land was acquired in 2003 following disputes with existing landowners. The building was completed in 2007 for over $1 billion. The Times Company's space was operated by W. P. Carey from 2009 to 2019; meanwhile, Forest City bought out ING's interest and was then acquired by Brookfield Properties in 2018.

== Site ==
The New York Times Building is at 620 Eighth Avenue, occupying the eastern side of the avenue between 40th Street and 41st Street, one block west of Times Square in the Midtown Manhattan neighborhood of New York City, New York, U.S. The land lot is rectangular and covers 79,000 ft^{2} (7,300 m^{2}). It has a frontage of 197.5 ft (60.2 m) on Eighth Avenue to the west and 400 feet (120 m) on both 40th Street to the south and 41st Street to the north. The site takes up the western portion of its city block, which is bounded by Seventh Avenue to the east. The topography of the site generally slopes down from east to west.

The New York Times Building is near Eleven Times Square and the Empire Theatre to the north, the City University of New York's Craig Newmark Graduate School of Journalism to the east, and the Port Authority Bus Terminal to the west. The site is directly bounded on two sides by New York City Subway tunnels. An entrance to the New York City Subway's 42nd Street–Port Authority Bus Terminal station, served by the 1, 2, 3, 7, <7>, A, C, E, N, Q, R, W, and S trains, is next to the building's base.

Prior to the building's construction, the site was occupied by a mixture of buildings. The site had been proposed for redevelopment since 1981 as the southern half of an unbuilt merchandise mart (see The New York Times Building § Site redevelopment). At Eighth Avenue and 40th Street was a six-story building erected in 1963, which housed the Taylor Business Institute and the SAE Institute. The address 260 West 41st Street contained Sussex House, an eight-story, 140-room dormitory, as well as a mural advertising garment store Seely Shoulder Shapes. Behind it was a 16-story office building at 265 West 40th Street. Sex shops, prostitution, and loitering were prevalent on the 41st Street side of the site. Five sex shops had been relocated from the site before the building's development, out of 55 businesses total.

== Architecture ==
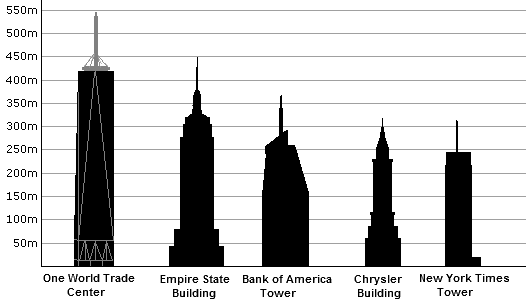
Height comparison of New York City buildings, with the New York Times Building on the right

The New York Times Building was designed by Renzo Piano and Fox & Fowle and was developed by the New York Times Company, Forest City Ratner, and ING Real Estate. It was Piano's first design in New York City. Gensler designed the interior under the supervision of Margo Grant Walsh. AMEC was the main contractor for the core and shell, while Turner Construction was the contractor for the Times space in the lower section of the building. Other companies involved with the project included structural engineer Thornton Tomasetti, wind consultant RWDI, sealant supplier Dow Corning Corporation, and steel supplier ArcelorMittal. The mechanical, electrical, and plumbing system was designed by Flack + Kurtz. Officially, the New York City Economic Development Corporation owns the site.

The Times Building is 52 stories tall with one basement, covering a gross floor area of 1,545,708 square feet (143,601.0 m^{2}). It has two major condominiums of office space: a lower section operated by the New York Times Company and an upper section operated by Brookfield Properties, which took over Forest City Ratner's stake in 2019. The Times space on the 2nd to 27th stories covers 800,000 square feet (74,000 m^{2}), about 58 percent of the office space, while the 29th to 52nd stories spans 600,000 square feet (56,000 m^{2}), covering the remaining 42 percent. The lobby and the mechanical spaces on the 28th and 51st stories are shared by the building's major operators. The top floor is 721 feet (220 m) high. The Times Building rises 748 feet (228 m) from the street to its roof, while the exterior curtain wall rises to 840 feet (256 m) and its mast rises to 1,046 feet (318.8 m). As of 2018, including its mast, the New York Times Building is the twelfth-tallest building in the city, tied with the Chrysler Building.

The Times Building was designed as a green building. During the building's construction, the architects created a 4,500-square-foot (420 m^{2}) mockup of a portion of the building to test out its environmental features. A yearlong study by the Lawrence Berkeley National Lab and Center for the Built Environment found the Times Building had significant reductions in annual electricity use, utilized less than half the heating energy, and decreased the peak electric demand compared to similarly sized office buildings. The developers did not wish to achieve Leadership in Energy and Environmental Design (LEED) certification, since that would have required extra expenditures, such as keeping track of construction debris.

=== Form and facade ===
The Times Building consists of two sections: the 52-story tower on the western portion of the site and a four-story podium occupying the eastern portion. The tower section covers about 24,500 square feet (2,280 m^{2}), with dimensions of 196 by 157 feet (60 by 48 m). The corners of the tower are notched, creating a cruciform layout. The outer columns on the west and east elevations are recessed several feet into the building. The center bays of the north and south elevations are cantilevered slightly past the outermost columns to the north and south. The podium measures 197 by 240 feet (60 by 73 m) with an area of about 55,000 square feet (5,100 m^{2}). The building contains a single basement level underneath the entire site, extending 15 feet (4.6 m) below grade.

There are three office entrances, one each on Eighth Avenue, 40th Street, and 41st Street. The facade consists of a glass curtain wall, with ceramic rods mounted on aluminum frames in front of the curtain wall. The facade was made by Benson Global, while the rods were subcontracted to a German sewer-pipe manufacturer. In designing the building, Piano said he was influenced by the massing of the Seagram Building, also in Midtown.

==== Ceramic rods ====
There are about 186,000 ceramic rods on the building's facade, which the architects referred to as "baguettes". The rods, measuring 1 5/8 inches (41 mm) in diameter, are mounted about 2 feet (0.61 m) in front of the curtain wall and are carried on aluminum "combs". The rods are made of aluminum silicate, a ceramic chosen for its durability and cost-effectiveness. The rods are intended to deflect heat and glare even if the glass panes were not tinted, and they can change color with the sun and weather. The rod spacing increases from the base to the top, adding transparency for the top 300 feet (91 m) of the usable space. At each story, the rods contain a slight gap at eye level. On the north and south elevations, the screens extend slightly past the notched corners. The rods extend about 73 feet (22 m) or 92 feet (28 m) above the primary roof; the screens on the west and east elevations are slightly shorter than those on the north and south elevations. The roof behind these rods contains mechanical equipment and was also supposed to include an unbuilt garden.

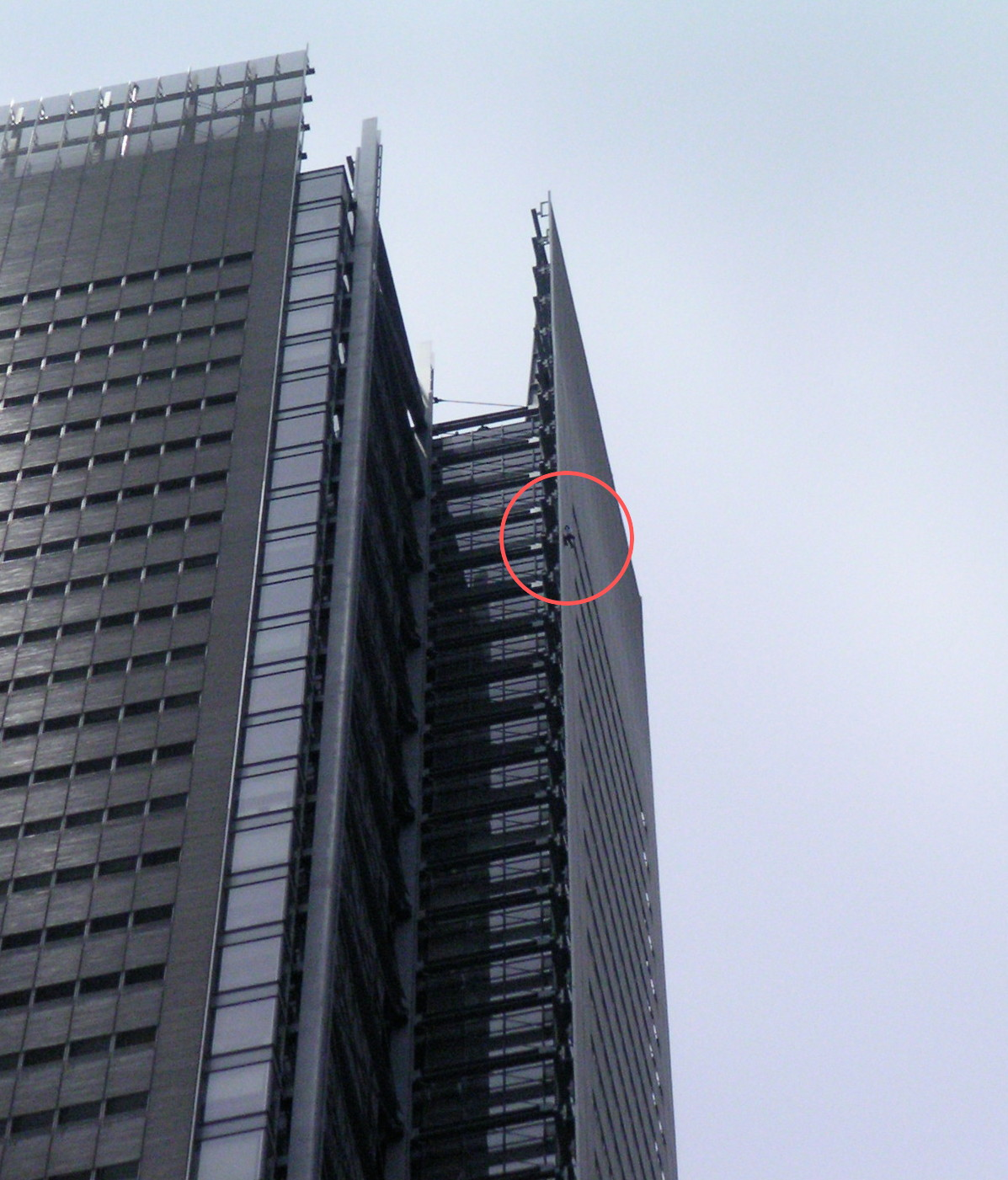
Alain Robert (circled, in red) climbing the New York Times Building on June 5, 2008

On the Eighth Avenue elevation is a sign with the logo of The New York Times, designed by Michael Bierut of Pentagram. Measuring 110 feet (34 m) long, the logo consists of the Times's name in the Fraktur font at a 10,116-point size. The logo itself is made of 959 custom aluminum sleeves measuring about 3 inches (76 mm) in diameter; these are wrapped around the ceramic rods. Metal halide lamps are also mounted on the facade in front of the rods. They are painted yellow to resemble the taxis of New York City.

The ceramic rods have attracted climbers, in part because the rods were originally spaced closely together. Shortly after completion, in mid-2008, three men illegally and independently climbed the ceramic rods on the facade. On June 5, 2008, professional climber Alain Robert climbed the north elevation to protest global warming; a second climber (Rey Clarke) scaled the west elevation later that day. The third climber, a Connecticut man, scaled the building on July 9 to protest the terrorist group Al-Qaeda. As a result of these incidents, some of the ceramic rods were removed, particularly on the north and south elevations, and glass panels were installed to deter climbing. People still climbed the building in later years, including in 2012 and in 2020.

==== Glass wall ====
The glass curtain wall is composed of double-glazed low emissivity panels that extend from the floor to the ceiling of each story. The panels generally measure 5 feet (1.5 m) wide and 13.5 feet (4.1 m) tall. The use of floor-to-ceiling glass was meant to signify the transparency of the media. It also maximizes natural light and the physical transparency of the facade. The window panes are generally protected by the ceramic rods. Since the rods contain a small gap at each story, the glass panels contain a small ceramic frit near these gaps. At ground level, there are glass storefronts, which allows pedestrians outside to see into the lobby. On Eighth Avenue, the storefronts are recessed 17 feet (5.2 m) from the lot line.

The notched corners contain exposed steel and lack screens, a design feature that represents the ideal of journalistic transparency. Instead, the corners contain one- and two-story-high rods, which serve as bracing and are designed in a pattern resembling the letter "X" (see The New York Times Building § Superstructure). The glass at the corners is also fritted.

=== Structural features ===
==== Substructure ====
Underneath the site is durable Hartland bedrock. Before the tower was constructed, the contractors made three sets of borings to extract samples of the composition of the ground. Directly underneath the tower portion of the site, the samples generally contained poor-quality weathered and decomposed rock at a depth of up to 70 feet (21 m). The borings on other parts of the site and underneath the surrounding sidewalk generally contained competent rock at a shallow depth, which increased in quality at greater depths. The northern lot line is adjacent to the IRT Flushing Line subway tunnel (used by the 7 and <7> trains) below 41st Street, as well as a pedestrian passageway at a shallower level. The western lot line is adjacent to the IND Eighth Avenue Line subway tunnel (used by the A, C, and E trains) under Eighth Avenue.

The foundation had to be capable of supporting 6,000 to 22,500 kilopascals (870 to 3,260 psi) of pressure. Most of the foundation is on intermediate- or high-quality rock and uses spread footings capable of 20 to 40 short tons per square foot (195 to 391 t/m^{2}). Caissons with rock sockets are installed under the southeast corner of the tower section, where the weakest rock exists. There are forty-two caissons with a diameter of 22 inches (560 mm), which extend between 31 and 89 feet (9.4 and 27.1 m) deep. They are reinforced with steel bars and could hold 850 to 1,250 short tons (760 to 1,120 long tons; 770 to 1,130 t) of vertical pressure. They are filled with concrete with a compressive strength of 6,000 pounds per square inch (41,000 kPa).

==== Superstructure ====
The building contains a superstructure with 23,500 short tons (21,000 long tons; 21,300 t) of steel. More than 95 percent of the beams are made of recycled steel. Steel was chosen over concrete because it allows flexible office spaces. The superstructure contains box columns measuring 30 by 30 inches (760 by 760 mm) in diameter. The flanges range from 4 inches (100 mm) thick at the base to 2 inches (51 mm) thick at the top stories, giving a lighter appearance. The beams are covered with intumescent coatings for fireproofing. The floor slabs are a composite consisting of 2.5 inches (64 mm) of concrete on a 3-inch (76 mm) metal deck. They are designed to carry live loads of 50 pounds per square foot (2.4 kPa), as well as partitions weighing up to 20 pounds per square foot (0.96 kPa). The Times's stories contain a raised floor structural system, with the finished office floors being above the floor slabs. Conversely, on the upper stories, the finished office floors are the slabs themselves.

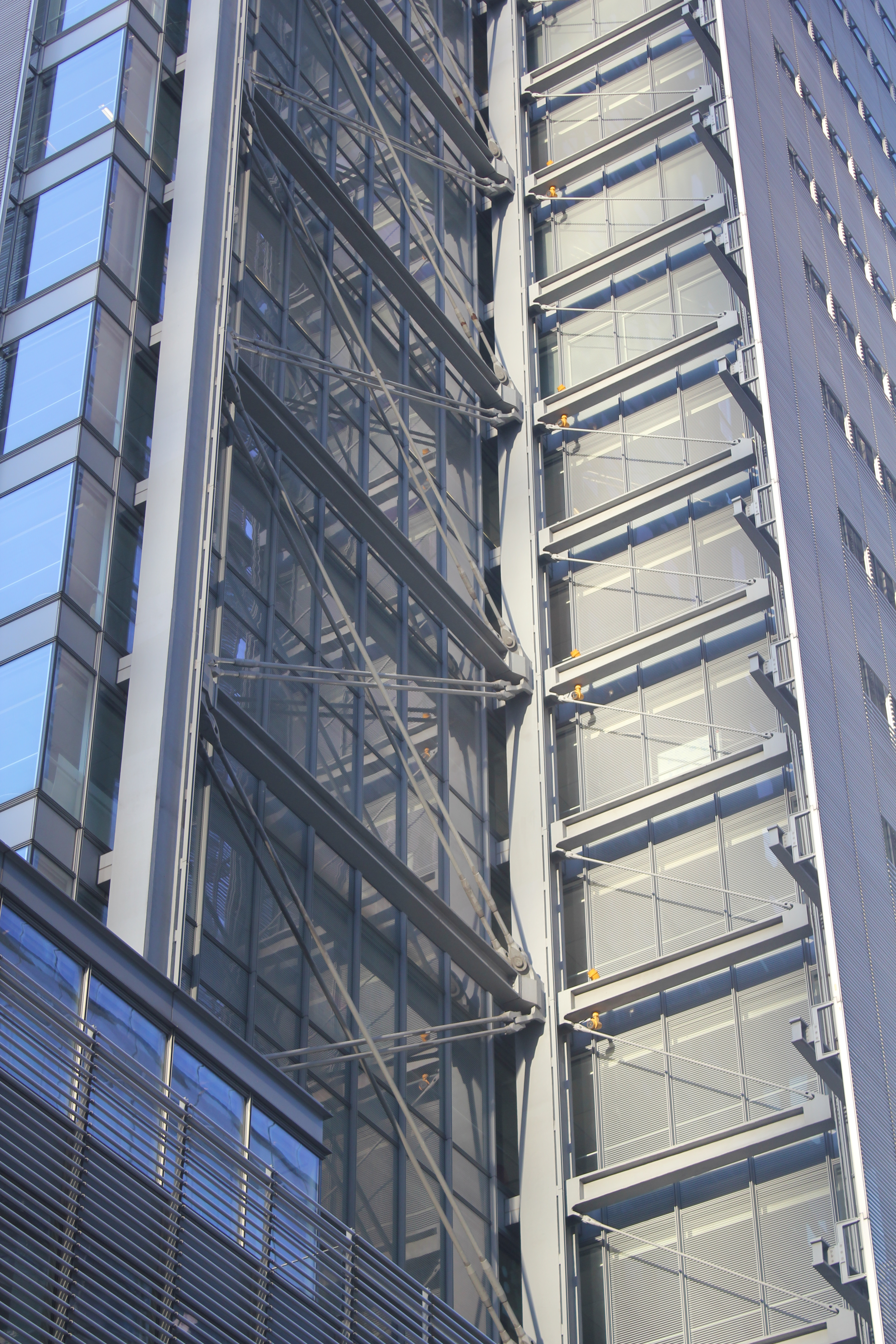
The "X"-bracing of the tower's corners can be seen at left, while the cantilevering of the ceramic screen can be seen at right.

The superstructure of the tower is braced to the mechanical core, which measures 90 by 65 feet (27 by 20 m). This allows the perimeter of the tower stories to be no more than 42 feet (13 m) from the core. The lower section of the tower, containing the Times's offices, contains two sets of bracing frames that surround the core from north to south. The top 21 stories contain a single bracing line extends from north to south. There are outriggers at the mechanical floors on the 28th and 51st stories. X-shaped braces are used at the tower's corners because the elevator core limits the extent to which west-east bracing lines could be used. The "X"-braces were pre-tensioned during construction to compensate for the shortening of columns. The braces are built in pairs, rather than as single rods, which would have required larger diameters.

On the north and south elevations, the center bays are cantilevered about 20 feet (6.1 m) past the perimeter columns. The floor girders of the cantilevered sections are arranged into three framing lines: two at the outer ends of the cantilevers and one at the center. The central girder on each floor is supported by a Vierendeel truss. The outer girders are connected to the perimeter columns by diagonal beams and to each other by columns. Because the Times's stories have raised floors, the girders on these stories protrude through the facade in an offset "dogleg".

The 51st-story mechanical space contains elevator rooms, air-conditioning, lighting, and telecommunications equipment, as well as a control area for the building's mechanical services. The main roof above the 52nd story consists of an asphalt covering, above which are concrete pavers on stone ballast. The mast atop the building is about 300 feet (91 m) tall and is made of carbon fiber, allowing it to bend during heavy winds without snapping. It extends from a circular baseplate on the 51st story, where it measures 8 feet (2.4 m) wide, and tapers to a width of 8 inches (200 mm) at its pinnacle. The mast is also supported from the roof of the 52nd story. To support the mast, trusses were designed within the floor slabs on the 51st and 52nd stories, and vertical trusses were used to shift the weight of the mast to the columns below.

=== Mechanical features ===
The New York Times Building has a cogeneration plant, which can provide 40 percent of the building's energy requirements. It is variously cited as being capable of 1.4 megawatts (1,900 hp) or 1.5 megawatts (2,000 hp). The plant is in a mechanical room on the top floor of the podium, at the far eastern end. The cogeneration plant is powered by two natural gas-fired engines. The New York Times Building is also connected to the main New York City power grid, which serves as a backup power source. Because of a disagreement with Consolidated Edison (Con Ed), the cogeneration plant is not connected to the grid. The plant runs at 85 or 89 percent efficiency.

Heat is generated as a byproduct of the cogeneration plant's operation and is used to provide hot water. The recovered hot water is used in the building's perimeter heating system during the winter, while it is fed into the building's chillers during the summer. The New York Times Building contains a single-stage absorption chiller that is capable of 250 metric tons (280 short tons; 250 long tons). The building also has five electric centrifugal chillers of 1,150 metric tons (1,270 short tons; 1,130 long tons) each, which serve the building's central chilled-water plant. The air from the chillers is delivered from chillers at 68 °F (20 °C). It travels to an underfloor air distribution system under each of the Times's stories and to the ceilings of the top 21 stories. The steam for heating the building itself is purchased from Con Ed rather than being generated on-site, since the architects determined on-site heat generation to be more expensive. The cellar and the podium's roof contain air handling units with steam coils that take low-pressure steam.

There are over 18,000 lighting fixtures in the offices, all of which can be dimmed. The electrical ballast in each fixture contains a computer chip, which adjusts the lighting based on natural light levels and on whether the office is occupied. There are also automatic shades, which change automatically based on the sun's position, sunlight glare, and interior heat gain. The shades can also be manually overridden. The movable shades reduce energy consumption by about 13 percent and reduce solar heat gain by 30 percent in the Times portion of the building. The upper stories have two data closets and two electric closets each. In addition, the building has emergency generators throughout.

=== Interior ===
There are 32 elevators total: 24 for passengers and eight for freight. The elevators can run as quickly as 1,600 feet per minute (490 m/min). The building's mechanical core contains four banks of elevators with seven shafts each. The lower stories are served by three elevators from each bank, while the upper stories are served by four elevators from each bank. The elevators contain a destination dispatch system, wherein passengers request their desired floor before entering the cab. Stairways on the tower's western and eastern sides also connect each of the tower stories.

==== Base ====
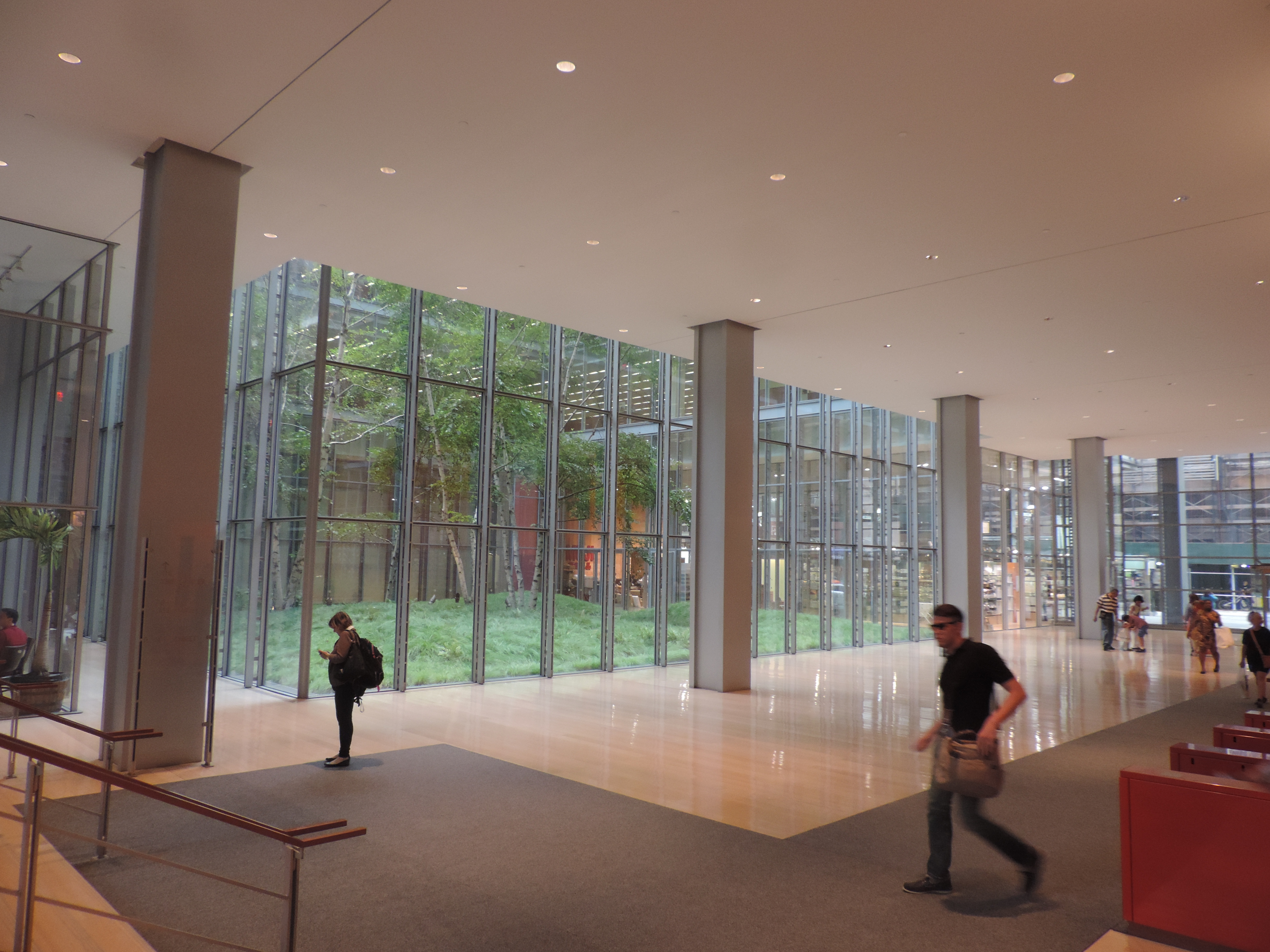
Lobby, facing toward the garden at the podium

When the New York Times Building was built, the ground floor was designed with a lobby, stores, auditorium, and central garden. Two restaurant spaces were also placed on Eighth Avenue. The retail space covers 21,000 square feet (2,000 m^{2}) or 22,000 square feet (2,000 m^{2}) of retail and was originally operated by Forest City Ratner. Under the building's lease agreement, space could not be leased to any fast-food or discount stores; educational centers; or any firm that could attract visitors "without appointment", including medical offices, employment agencies, welfare agencies, or court uses. Furthermore, the United Nations and most governmental agencies of any kind were banned if they could attract visitors "without appointment". (Note: For the terms of the lease, see: "Agreement of Lease by and Between 42nd St. Development Project, Inc., Landlord, and the New York Times Building Llc, Tenant Dated as of: December 12, 2001". U.S. Securities and Exchange Commission. December 12, 2001.) To allow passersby to look in, shelves could not be more than 6 feet (1.8 m) tall.

From 2007 to 2024, the ground-floor lobby had an art installation called Moveable Type, created by artist Ben Rubin and statistics professor Mark Hansen. The work consists of 280 small electronic screens arranged on either of the lobby's two walls, or 560 total. The screens on each wall are arranged in a grid measuring 53 by 5 feet (16.2 by 1.5 m), with forty columns and seven rows. They display fragments from both the Times's archives and current news stories. The lobby is supported by exposed intumescent beams and contains oak floors and full-height glass windows. Also inside the podium is The Times Center, which includes a 378-seat auditorium for events. The Times Center also includes a 5,000-square-foot (460 m^{2}) meeting space.

The Times Center and lobby overlook a garden at the center of the podium, which is visible from the lobby but closed to the public. The garden is surrounded by a glass wall measuring 70 feet (21 m) high and 70 feet across on three sides. Designed by HMWhite Architects, it contains seven paper birch trees measuring 50 feet (15 m) tall. (Note: One source, published before the garden was completed, said the garden would include nine paper birch trees measuring 40 feet (12 m) tall.) The garden originally had a moss glen, but this was replaced in 2010 with ferns and grasses. The birch trees are placed on the northwestern side of the garden, while the mosses were placed on hills in the rest of the space. A walkway made of Ipe wood runs around the garden, and doors lead to the garden from the north and south sides. The walls of the atrium are transparent, resulting in numerous incidents where birds flew into the walls.

==== New York Times office unit ====
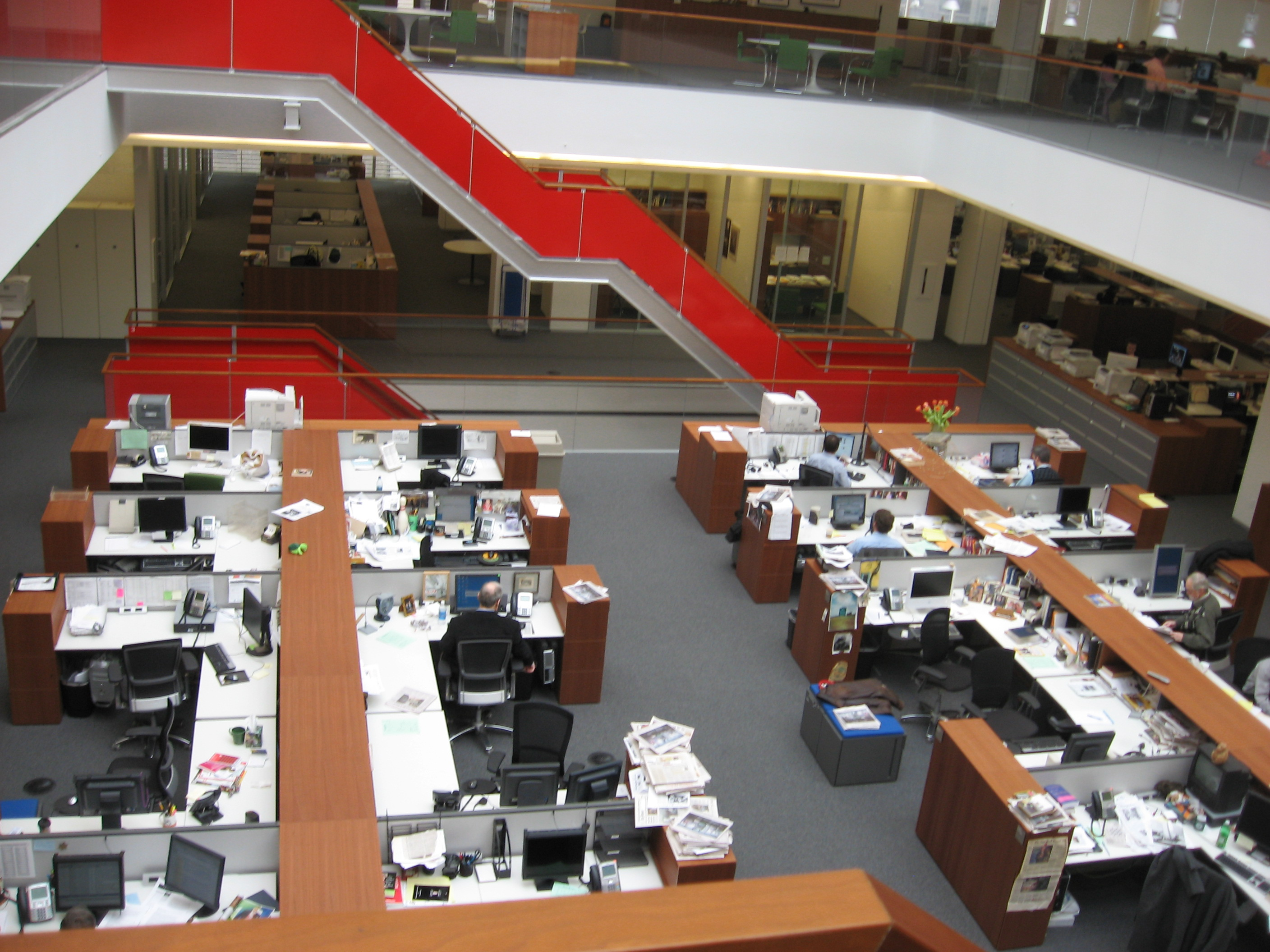
The New York Times newsroom

The Times owned the 2nd to 27th stories but leased out the top six stories of that space before the building's opening. Within the Times section of the building, the structural floor slabs are 16 inches (410 mm) below the finished office floors. The girders at the building's core, as well as utilities and mechanical systems, are placed beneath the raised floors. Air is delivered from under the raised floors. Air enters most of the office spaces through diffusers near each workstation, and perforated floor tiles are used in the Times' conference rooms. The Times offices can also use outdoor air for ventilation, and the air is generally ventilated through the ceiling. The perimeter of each Times story has a ceiling 10.5 feet (3.2 m) high, but most of the office space has a ceiling 9 feet 7 inches (2.92 m) high. The ceiling is divided into a grid of tiles measuring 5 by 5 feet (1.5 by 1.5 m), aligned with the vertical mullions of the facade.

The Times generally arranges its offices in an open plan. The 2nd through 4th stories contain the Times newsroom, which extends into the podium and overlooks the garden. The podium also accommodated the Times' web-based staff. Stairs with red banisters connect the newsroom's stories, while a skylight illuminates the workspaces. Throughout the building, the Times offices mainly contain cherry wood furniture. The desks of the Times offices had gypsum-board accents, which themselves are colored in a scarlet red tone, nicknamed "Renzo Red". Copy writers' desks are smaller and have laminate desks without partitions. Two red staircases, one on each side of the building, connect the Times offices. There is also a double-height cafeteria in the Times' section of the building. To encourage interactions between staffers, the offices were generally not assigned to specific workers, and various furniture was scattered throughout; even the staircases are designed as wide-open spaces.

The Times space is decorated with about 560 black-and-white prints from the paper's archive. The conference rooms are named after notable figures, supplemented by images from the Times archive. There are about 750 distinct photographs, which illustrate not only the conference rooms but also spaces such as mechanical rooms, electrical closets, and restrooms. The elevator lobbies on each story have different pieces of contemporary furniture, as well as a set of ten video screens that display images from that day's newspaper. Lessees within the upper portion of the Times space, such as law firms Goodwin Procter and Seyfarth Shaw, decorated their offices with more ornate finishes to attract clients.

==== Brookfield office unit ====
The top 21 stories were designed to be leased to tenants. The rental office floors generally use chilled-water air handlers and receive both cooling and ventilation from the ceiling. On the 29th through 50th stories, the core girders are not depressed below the floor slab, but they can support a raised floor of up to 6 inches (150 mm). The minimum height of the office space is 9 feet 7 inches (2.92 m), though some parts of the ceiling can be up to 10 feet (3.0 m) high.

The upper floors were generally marketed to law firms. The spaces were, for the most part, also designed by Gensler. Since law firms generally did not require the open-plan layouts that the Times used, Gensler modified the upper stories' floor-plate dimensions to accommodate more attorneys in the same space. According to the firm's managing principal Robin Klehr Avia, this was done "so you don't have a lot of support areas without enough windows". Some tenants did not use the 5-foot-wide modules that the Times used. Gensler designed several tenants' offices with furniture and color schemes similar to those in the Times offices.

== History ==
=== Context ===
==== Previous New York Times buildings ====
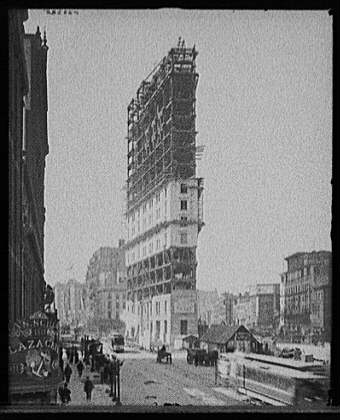
The former Times Building at One Times Square as seen in 1904

The New York Times, founded in 1851, was first housed in 113 Nassau Street in Lower Manhattan. It moved to 138 Nassau Street, the site of what is now the Potter Building, in 1854. The Times moved to a neighboring five-story edifice at 41 Park Row in 1858. Partially prompted by the development of the neighboring New York Tribune Building, the Times replaced its building in 1889 with a new 13-story building at the same site, one that remains in use by Pace University with some modifications.

In 1905, the paper moved to One Times Square at 42nd Street and Broadway. The area surrounding the new headquarters was renamed from Longacre Square to Times Square. The Times outgrew the slender Times Tower within a decade and, in 1913, moved into the Times Annex at 229 West 43rd Street. By 1999, the Times operated at six locations in Manhattan and had a printing plant in Queens.

==== Site redevelopment ====
The Urban Development Corporation (UDC), an agency of the New York state government, had proposed redeveloping the area around a portion of West 42nd Street in 1981. Among the UDC's plans was a garment merchandise mart on Eighth Avenue between 40th and 42nd Streets, opposite Port Authority Bus Terminal. The project was to be completed by the Times Square Redevelopment Corporation, comprising members of the New York state and city governments. David Morse and Richard Reinis were selected in April 1982 to develop the mart, but they were removed from the project that November due to funding issues. Subsequently, the state and city disputed over the replacement development team, leading the city to withdraw from the partnership in August 1983. The state and city reached a compromise on the development team that October, wherein the mart would be developed by Tishman Speyer, operated by Trammell Crow, and funded by Equitable Life Assurance.

Kohn Pedersen Fox designed a 20-story structure with 2.4 million square feet (220,000 m^{2}) for apparel and computer showrooms. The building would have a limestone and granite facade, a wide arch with a clock spanning 41st Street, arched entrances on Eighth Avenue, and a set of pavilions with ten pyramids on the roof. The proposal was complicated by the fact that developer Paul Milstein wanted to build a 36-story hotel and office building on the northern half of the site, north of what is now the Times building. Kennedy Enterprises was selected to operate a smaller mart in 1987. Chemical Bank had considered occupying office space at the mart before withdrawing in 1989. The mart plan was never completed because of a weakened market.

=== Development ===
By mid-1999, state and city officials were planning a request for proposals for the southern half of the merchandise mart site. The Times's parent company, the New York Times Company, proposed a 1.3-million-square-foot (120,000 m^{2}) headquarters tower, citing its need to enlarge its operations. If this was not possible, the company would keep its headquarters at 43rd Street but move some jobs to New Jersey. In October 1999, the Times reported that its parent company was negotiating for the site. Though the site was highly visible due to the low stature of the Port Authority Bus Terminal to the west, it was also at the extreme corner of both the traditional Times Square area to the north and the Garment District to the south. Nevertheless, as architect Robert A. M. Stern wrote, the New York Times Company likely perceived the site's fringe location as a beneficial attribute. The new site was not commonly considered to be part of Times Square, leading Paul Goldberger of The New Yorker to say that the plan "has implications that go beyond the sentimental".

==== Selection of developer and architect ====
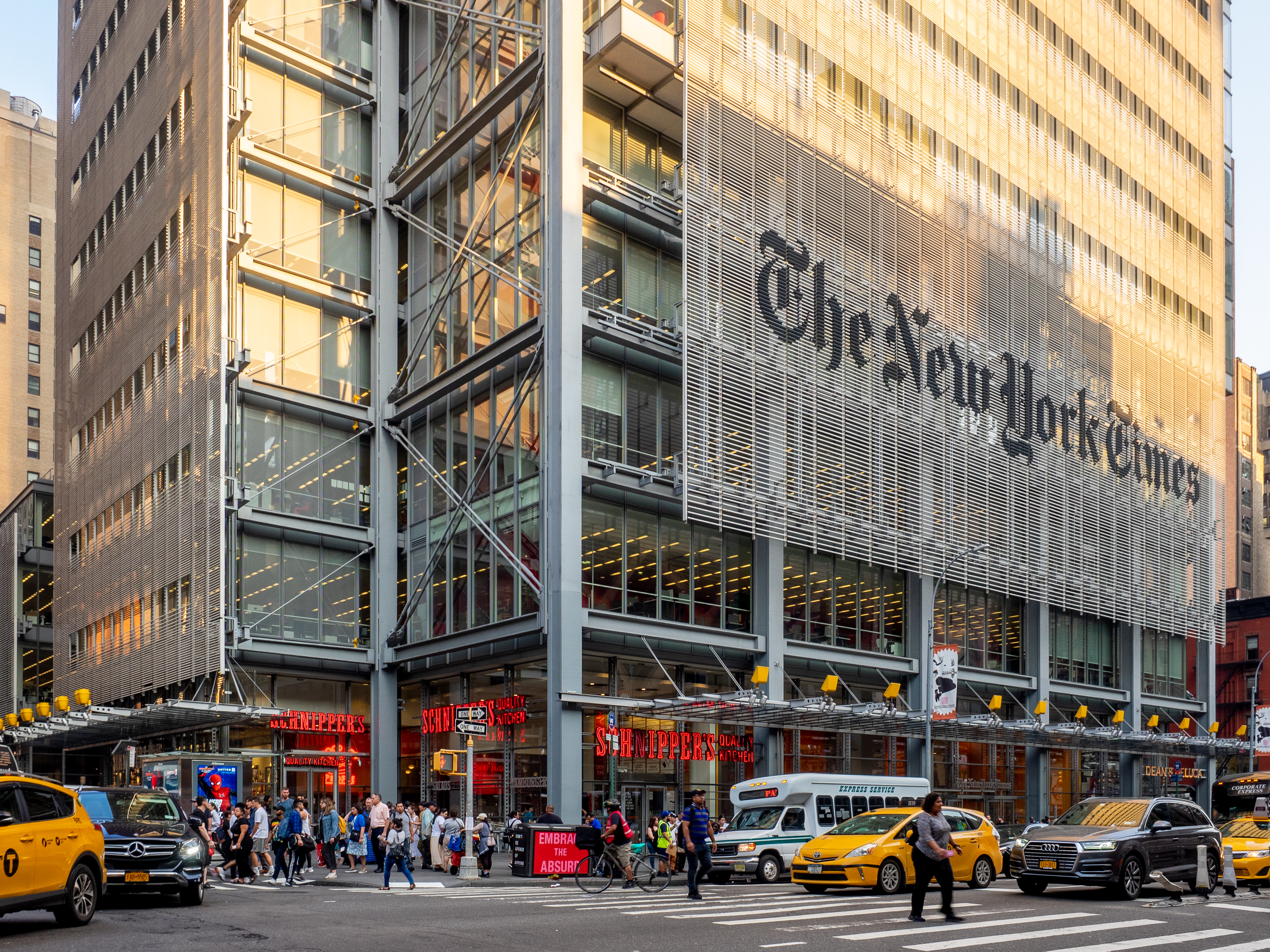
Lower portion of the building

The Times selected Forest City Ratner Companies as the developer for its Eighth Avenue tower in February 2000. The following month, the Times began negotiating with the city and state. The Times wanted to pay $75 million and a two-thirds deduction in real estate taxes, but the state wanted $125 million for the site and the city wanted the Times to pay full taxes. Some commentators wrote about how the Times had opposed corporate tax relief despite seeking such relief for itself. The parties signed a nonbinding agreement in June 2000, wherein the Times agreed to pay $100 million. The Times was to occupy half of the planned tower, a single unit covering the second through 28th floors. The remainder of the space would be operated by Forest City and leased to office tenants. At the time, other media headquarters were being developed nearby, such as the Hearst Tower on 57th Street and the Condé Nast Building at 4 Times Square.

Robert A. M. Stern, his colleague Paul Whalen, and Naresh Kapadia of the 42nd Street Development Project created a set of design guidelines in advance of an architectural design competition for the building. They also created a model conforming to ideals set by the chairman of the New York City Planning Commission. The design guidelines were printed in a 48-page program with a statement by Times architecture critic Herbert Muschamp. Times Company vice chairman Michael Golden said of the design: "We need to contribute to the skyline of New York. We don't want to have people say, 'Gee, The New York Times built a four-story brick warehouse in Manhattan.'"

In September 2000, four architects submitted bids for the new tower's design: Renzo Piano, Norman Foster, César Pelli, and the partnership of Frank Gehry and David Childs. Piano called for a rectangular tower rising from a large podium; Foster proposed a right triangle tapering toward the top; Pelli outlined a glass tower with several chamfers; and the Gehry/Childs partnership planned a structure with billowing sheets of glass on the facade. The Gehry/Childs partnership was widely speculated in the media to be the front-runner, but Gehry was worried that the integrity of his design would be compromised in later revisions. As a result, he and Childs withdrew their plan from consideration. Ultimately, the Times selected Piano's proposal in October 2000, and it selected Gensler as the interior architect in February 2001. Piano's plan called for a 776-foot (237 m) structure with a ceramic screen rising to 840 feet (260 m) and a mast rising to 1,142 feet (348 m). Fox & Fowle was selected as Piano's co-architect, focusing on smaller design details and costs.

==== Site acquisition ====
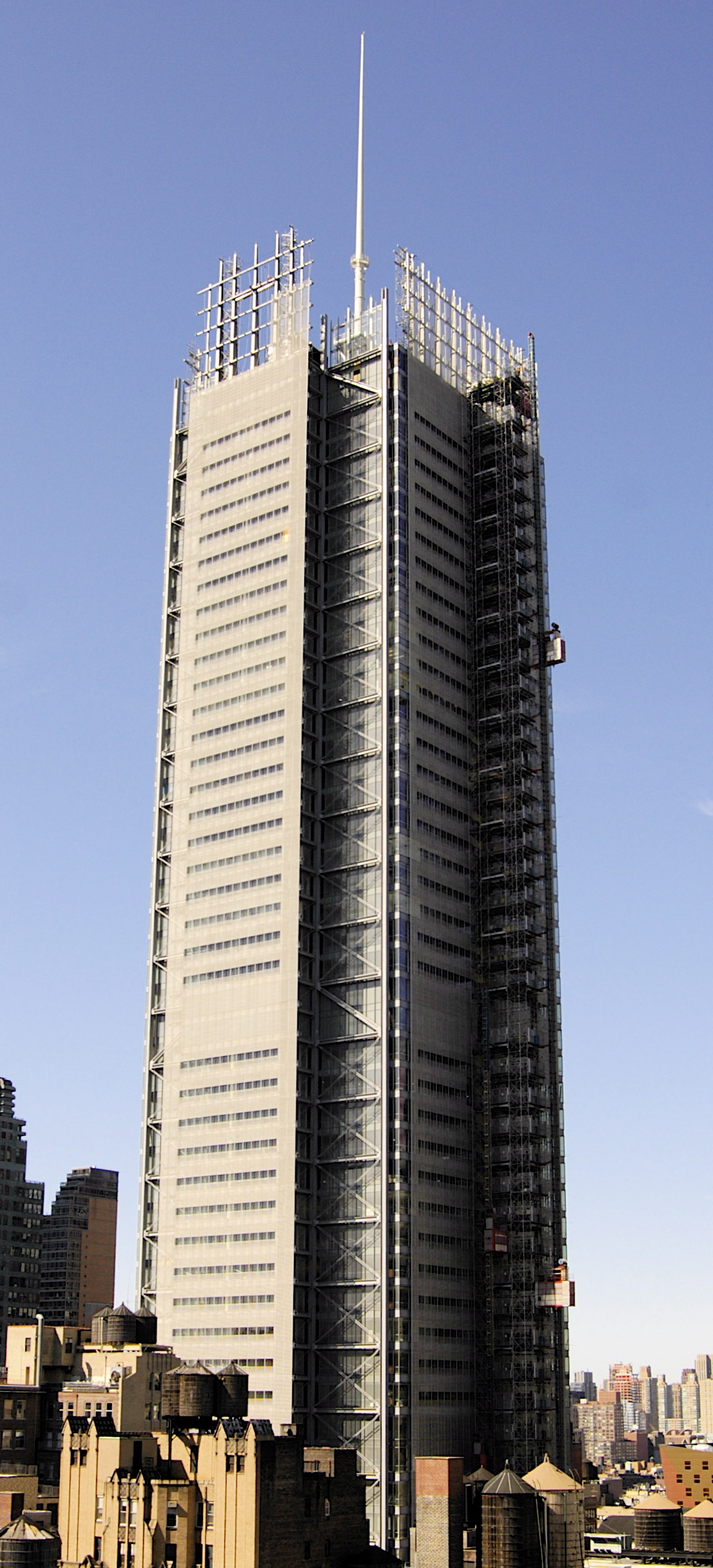
Seen from the southeast

The Empire State Development Corporation (ESDC) had, since the late 1990s, tried to condemn ten lots on the site through eminent domain, but some existing landlords had sued to stop the condemnation. A state court rejected the landlords' claim and, in February 2001, the New York Court of Appeals denied an appeal. The Times and Forest City Ratner negotiated terms of the project, in which the Times would receive $26.1 million in tax breaks. The company would lease the site from the state for $85.6 million over 99 years, considerably below market value. Its payment in lieu of taxes was equivalent to the site's full property tax assessments.

In September 2001, the ESDC scheduled a public hearing for the project. Following the September 11 attacks, which occurred in the meantime, the Times reaffirmed its commitment to a new headquarters. At the hearing, many large landlords expressed their support for the new Times headquarters, citing the loss of office space that had been caused by the collapse of the World Trade Center during the attacks. The existing property owners opposed the condemnation, saying that the block was no longer legally a blighted area. That December, the ESDC was authorized to condemn the properties on the site. If the acquisition cost exceeded $85.6 million, the additional cost would be covered by taxpayer funds. By law, the ESDC first had to offer to buy the land from the owners, using the condemnation process only as a last resort.

The Times publicly announced plans for the building on December 13, 2001. Piano had originally intended to include an open piazza at the base, but the revised plans called for a tower rising directly from Eighth Avenue, with the Times newsroom surrounding a garden. The main roof would have its own garden and antenna mast. The tower retained its planned glass curtain wall, but the structural system was strengthened. Paul Goldberger wrote that the building, the largest New York City development proposed since the September 11 attacks, "would have drawn plenty of attention even if it had been just another corporate box".

Gary Barnett of Intell Development, one of the landowners on the site, filed a lawsuit that December, alleging that the Times had engaged in "fraud, bad faith, and collusion against the taxpayers of the city" by taking tax breaks. Barnett was joined by five other owners who wanted to build their own structure on the land. During the lawsuit, The Village Voice reported that taxpayer funds would need to cover an additional $79 million of the Times site's cost. A New York state judge ruled against Barnett and his co-plaintiffs in August 2002. Over the following year, the state evicted some 55 businesses on the site. The Times itself reported that the state had only provided modest compensation to displaced property owners. The Supreme Court of the United States declined to hear a challenge brought by the landowners in February 2003. That September, the state had assembled the site and the developers started razing existing buildings. Forest City and ING Real Estate held a 42 percent leasehold stake while the New York Times Company owned the remaining 58 percent.

==== Funding ====
In mid-2003, Forest City announced it would request $400 million in tax-free Liberty bonds, allocated for September 11 recovery efforts, to finance the building's construction. Forest City claimed it could not finance its portion of the tower. This request, along with a similar one for the Bank of America Tower three blocks northeast, received public criticism. By October 2003, the construction of the headquarters had been delayed by a year. Forest City had not been able to secure an anchor tenant for its portion of the building, and the Liberty-bond negotiations between Forest City and the state and city governments had stalled. By that time, Forest City had reduced its request to $150 million. ESDC head Charles A. Gargano reportedly held an unfavorable view of Forest City's application for bonds. If financing could not be obtained before construction started in 2004, the project would have to be canceled.

After failing to secure Liberty bonds, the developers applied to GMAC Commercial Mortgage Corporation for financing. GMAC provided $320 million in construction funding for the project in July 2004. Times officials predicted that work would start in the middle of that year. That November, the Times sold its old 229 West 43rd Street building to Tishman Speyer for $175 million, though the paper planned to remain at that building for the time being. This prompted criticism from some of the site's former landowners, and The Village Voice said the proceeds from the sale "wiped out the need for much, if not all, of the taxpayer money the Times asked for". According to the Voice, the Times had predicted that its 43rd Street building would have sold for $45 million in 1999.

=== Construction ===
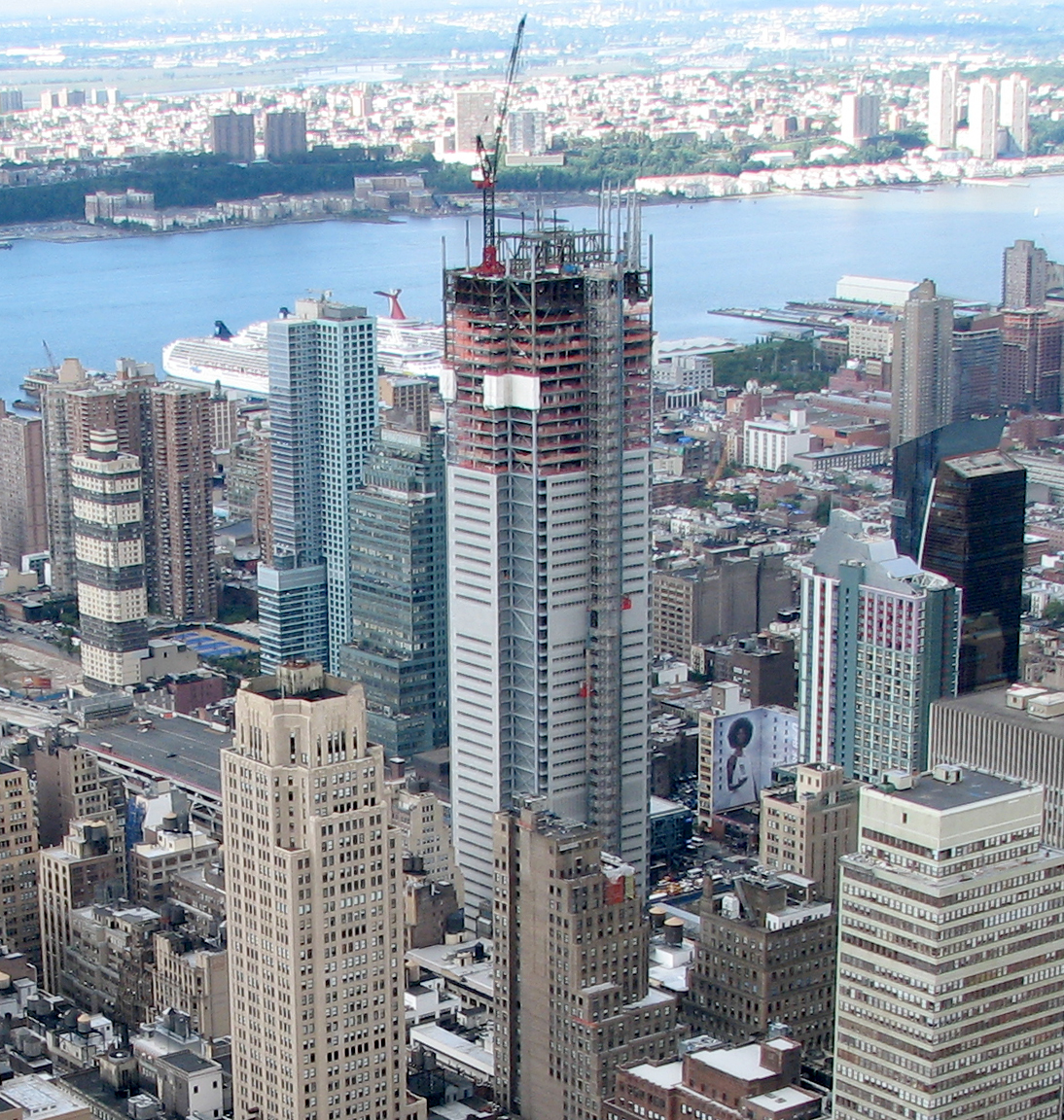
The building under construction in September 2006

Work began on the new Times building in late 2004, after financing had been secured. Civetta Cousins Joint Venture was hired as the foundation contractor, and work started in August or September 2004. Forest City's executive vice president MaryAnne Gilmartin said the development would conclude a revitalization of the western extremities of Midtown Manhattan. The first steel was erected starting in April 2005, and the foundation was finished that July. Work was slightly delayed during the middle of that year due to a labor strike among ironworkers. The steelwork had reached a height of 400 feet by October 2005. By then, ten of the eleven former landowners were requesting that the city and state governments give them additional compensation, as they alleged their land had been seized at well below market value. The eleventh landowner had been satisfied with a settlement.

A groundbreaking ceremony took place in late 2005. The building still had several hundred thousand square feet of vacant office space, in part due to the higher rent in Midtown compared to Lower Manhattan. Real-estate industry executives also expressed uncertainty that architectural renderings of the ceramic curtain wall, and the site's location near the Port Authority Bus Terminal, would be a drawback for tenants. To advertise the upper stories, Forest City hired photographer Annie Leibovitz to photograph the tower's construction. During construction, in March 2006, a rod fell from the tower and dented the roof of a passing car, slightly injuring its occupants. The steel superstructure was topped out during July 2006. The mast was installed later that year. By that October, the facade had been installed to the 42nd floor and interior finishes were being placed on lower stories. Before the lights and screens on the facade were installed, a mockup of the system was constructed in the parking lot of the Times printing plant in Queens.

=== Usage ===
==== Opening and late 2000s ====
The first office tenant at the New York Times Building was law firm Seyfarth Shaw, which leased the 31st to 33rd stories in May 2006. Law firm Covington & Burling then leased the 39th to 43rd stories, while law firm Osler, Hoskin & Harcourt signed for the 36th and 37th stories. Investment firm Legg Mason signed a lease in August 2006 for the 45th to 50th stories, committing to develop the roof garden and a conference center on the 52nd story. Simultaneously, Forest City also announced its intention to buy ING's stake in the ground-story retail and upper-story office space. By late 2006, there was strong demand for office space in the building, particularly among law firms, and the Times had hired CBRE Group to market the 23rd to 27th stories.

Goodwin Procter leased the 23rd through 27th, 29th, and 30th stories in March 2007. The 38th floor was taken that April by Korean architecture firm Samoo Architects & Engineers and developer JP Properties, while Judicial Arbitration and Mediation Services took the 34th floor. The first New York Times employees started moving into the building by May 2007. The following month, on June 11, the Times shifted its publishing operations from 43rd Street to its new Eighth Avenue headquarters. Times reporter David W. Dunlap wrote that Piano had described the new building as having "lightness, transparency and immateriality", which intentionally did not fit the traditional image of the "old-fashioned newspaper". The Eighth Avenue building officially opened on November 19, 2007. In total, the structure was projected to cost over $1 billion. In two separate incidents in December 2007 and January 2008, several window panes were cracked by wind gusts.

The Japanese company Muji opened a store at the base during May 2008. The four other retail spaces were leased by grocery store Dean & DeLuca, Japanese restaurant Inakaya, Italian restaurant Montenapo by Bice, and a roadside-themed cafe. Also in 2008, the 44th story was occupied by solar energy company First Solar and the Flemish Government. After the tower was scaled several times in mid-2008, workers removed some of the facade's ceramic rods and added glass panels to deter climbing. Piano supported the modifications, but he said that climbing was not even a consideration during the planning process, even though Times executives had focused extensively on reducing the tower's vulnerability to terrorism. By the end of that year, the New York Times Company was facing financial shortfalls and sought to mortgage its building to refinance debt. By January 2009, the Times was negotiating to sell the nineteen stories that it occupied, the 2nd through 21st stories, to W. P. Carey for $225 million. In exchange, the Times would lease back its floors for $24 million a year for 10 years. The leaseback was finalized in March 2009.

==== 2010s to present ====
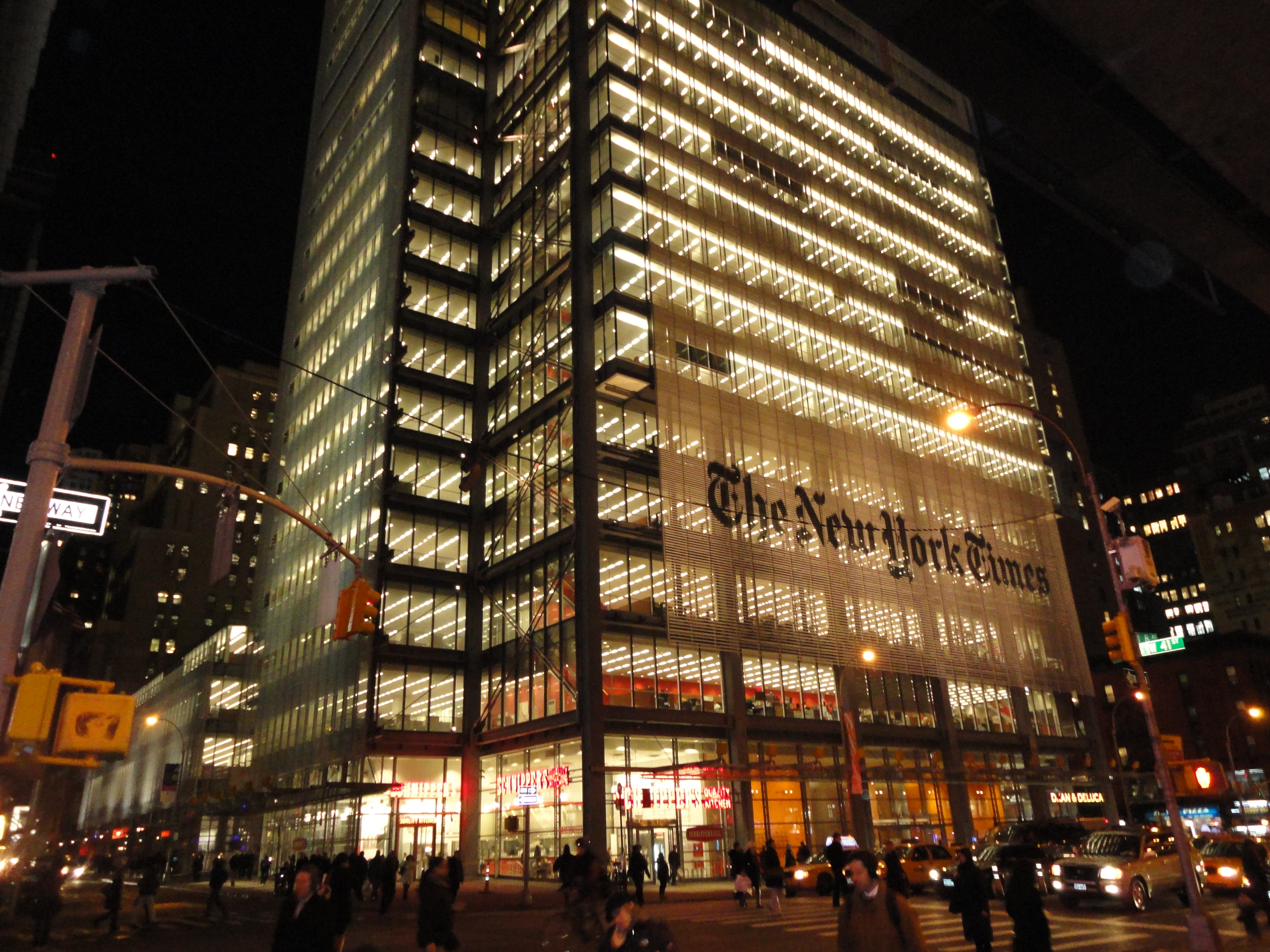
The main entrance on Eighth Avenue

Part of the 44th story was sublet in 2010 to Kepos Capital, which occupied the space for eight years. By late 2013, the Times wished to lease out the 21st story, the only part of the building that it still owned. Technology company Bounce Exchange leased the 21st story in early 2015 from the Times, which had previously housed its sales and marketing department there.

In December 2016, the Times announced it was subletting at least eight floors, totaling 250,000 square feet (23,000 m^{2}), to save the costs of occupying that space. Gensler was hired to reorganize the space, including removing some corner offices that belonged to high-ranking executives such as the CEO and the publisher. Over half of the sublet space, covering 140,000 square feet (13,000 m^{2}), was sublet a little more than a year later to financial firm Liquidnet. During late 2018, British outsourcing firm Williams Lea Tag signed a 10-year lease for 31,058 square feet (2,885.4 m^{2}) of space on the 10th story. Covington & Burling also expanded to the 44th story that year.

The Times announced in February 2018 that it would repurchase the building's leasehold from W. P. Carey. Brookfield Properties, which had acquired Forest City Ratner, refinanced the building's first floor and the 28th- through 50th-story condominiums in late 2018 for $635 million. The loan was provided by Deutsche Bank, Bank of America, Barclays Capital, and Citi; it consisted of a $515 million commercial mortgage-backed security and a $120 million junior note. Some $115 million in mezzanine debt was also provided. The Times exercised its option on the leasehold in late 2019 for $245 million. In February 2025, the credit rating of Brookfield's office space was downgraded after several major tenants moved out. Brookfield had taken out mortgage loans totaling $900 million, which needed to be repaid by that December, and there was not enough rental income to pay off the loans.

== Reception ==
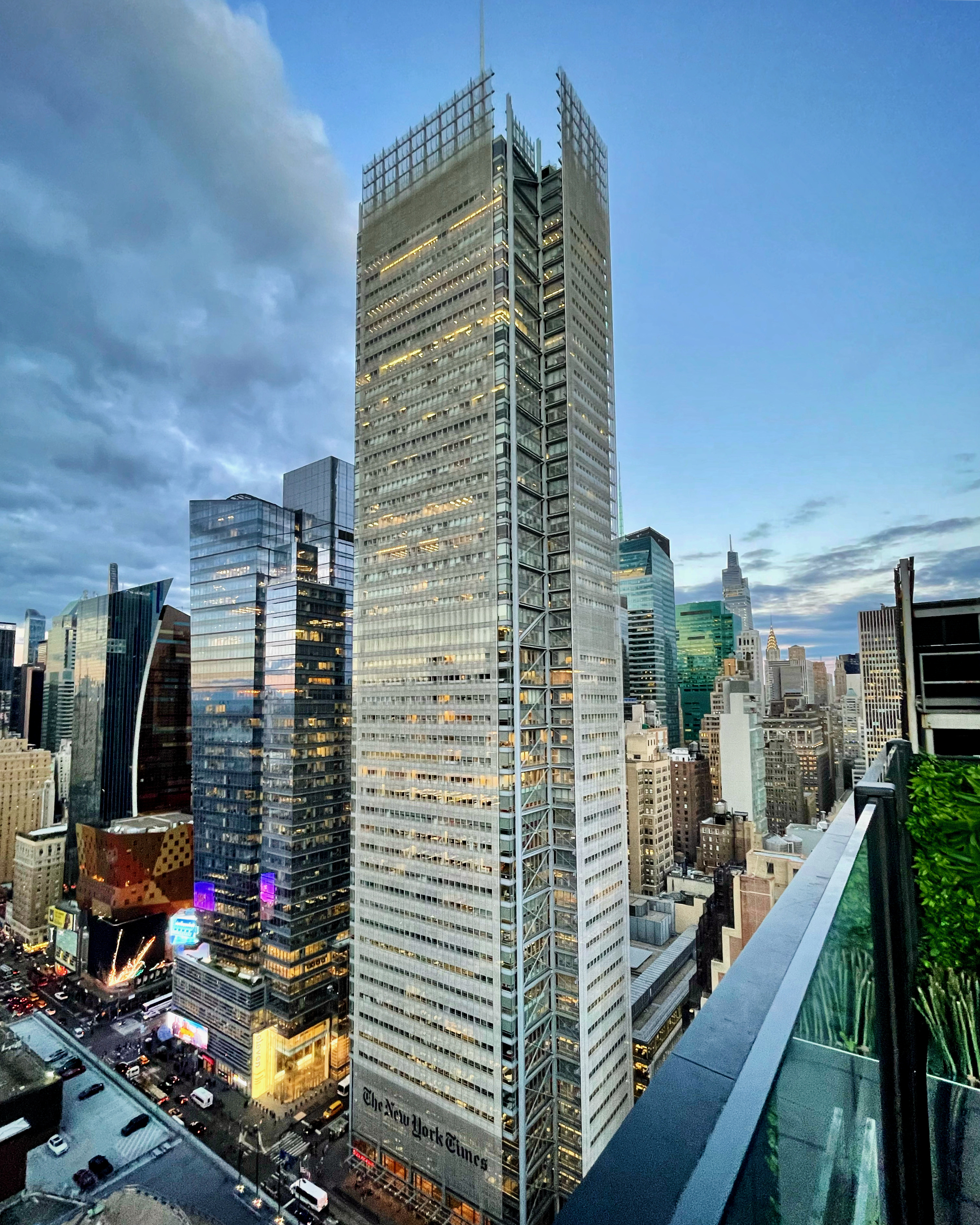
The building at sunset

When Piano was selected for the Times Building, architectural critic Martin Filler called the selection "very disappointing", saying that "a lot of [Piano's] commercial work is really terrible". Herbert Muschamp, architecture critic for the Times, wrote that Piano was the "world's greatest living practitioner of what I call 'normative' architecture", though he criticized the base as having "too little contrast with the city outside". After the September 11 attacks, Muschamp wrote, "There may be no more constructive way to fill the architectural void [of the World Trade Center] than to revisit the history of progressive architecture in this town", including the planned Times Building and Hearst Tower. Times design writer Steven Heller lamented the move, saying: "The Piano building will be a showpiece, not a home."

Architecture magazine wrote in early 2002 that, with its paucity of bright signage that characterized other Times Square buildings, "The architect has chosen to speak to the Times, not to Times Square." Just before the start of construction, Justin Davidson of Newsday wrote that "lightness is both a metaphoric and an architectural goal" in the building's design. In 2006, Paul Goldberger wrote for The New Yorker that the Times Building "comes off as dainty, even flimsy, as if inside this huge tower a little building were struggling to get out", in contrast with Piano's then-recent Morgan Library & Museum expansion. Goldberger felt the newsroom was austere, but he praised the Times Building's "light, ephemeral crown" as elegant. James Gardner of the New York Sun said that he did not believe the Times Building to be "a bad building" but that the ceramic bars "becomes the sort of pure ornamentalism that betrays so much contemporary architecture that overzealously aspires to appear purely functional". James S. Russell said the building "conjures the most beautiful light I have ever seen in an office building", even though he regarded it as overwhelming.

When the building was completed, Times architecture critic Nicolai Ouroussoff wrote: "Depending on your point of view, the Times Building can thus be read as a poignant expression of nostalgia or a reassertion of the paper's highest values as it faces an uncertain future. Or, more likely, a bit of both." He found the crown lackluster and the screens "flat and lifeless", Suzanne Stephens of Architectural Record wrote that the building "seems strangely bland in New York's architecturally variegated context". Historian Francesco Dal Co said the horizontal rods gave the impression of bands, which he felt enhanced the building's modernist pedigree, and architect Philip Nobel said the X-shaped braces evoked the Port Authority Bus Terminal.

The American Institute of Architects' 2007 survey List of America's Favorite Architecture ranked the New York Times Building among the top 150 buildings in the United States. In addition, the building received the American Institute of Architects' 2009 Honor Award.

== See also ==
- List of tallest buildings in New York City
- List of tallest buildings in the United States
- List of tallest freestanding structures in the world
- List of tallest freestanding steel structures
