= CoCa =

CoCa may refer to:

- Center on Contemporary Art, non-profit arts organization in Seattle, Washington, USA
- Centre of Contemporary Art, curated art gallery in Christchurch, New Zealand
- Coheed and Cambria, American progressive rock band
