= 911 Media Arts Center =

Non-profit media center in Seattle

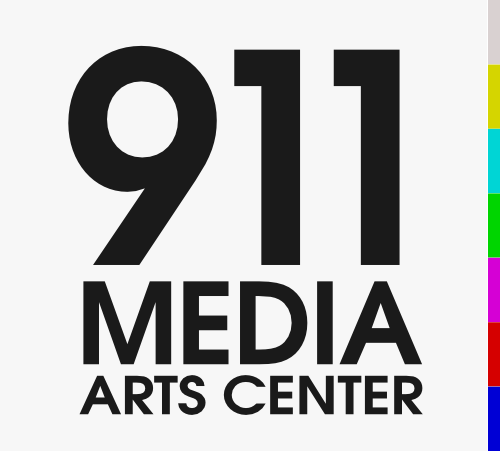
911 Media Arts Center Logo, 2011

911 Media Arts Center is a non-profit media arts and access center located in Seattle, Washington. 911 Media Arts Center was incorporated on August 14, 1984, to support the expressive use of media tools through training, equipment, and access grants. The organization also provides a forum and venue for those working in the new media disciplines. The center is a member-supported non-profit organization and receives other funding from education tuition and state, city, and county grants, along with grants from private foundations and individuals.

== History ==
Former Screening Room at 911 Media Arts Center's 9th Avenue Address in 2006

Initially known as the Focal Point Media Center, "Nine One One Media" split off from the AND/OR Gallery in Seattle during August 1984. The center was founded by Anne Focke, Heather Dew Oaksen, Jill Medvedow, Norie Sato, and others. 911 Media Arts Center was originally located at 911 E. Pine Street in Seattle, hence the namesake.

The first director of the organization, during 1984-85, was Jill Medvedow who is now director at the Institute of Contemporary Art, Boston. The directorship was followed by Glenn Weiss during 1986-88, Weiss is now Manager of Public Art in Times Square. The current director is art historian, critic and educator Steven Michael Vroom.

911 Media Arts Center has had addresses on both Yale Street and 9th Ave in what is now the South Lake Union neighborhood. The center is currently located at 909 NE 43rd Street Suite 206, in the same building as the Jack Straw Foundation.

In 2011, under the directorship of Steven Michael Vroom, the center received a $50,000 capacity building grant from the Andy Warhol Foundation.

== Services ==
The center provides education for professionals, students and youth. Classes and workshops topics focus on media literacy including video, audio, physical computing, image processing, code art and web production. Youth education is a strong focus of the organization. Current partnerships include Coyote Central and Northwest African American Museum.

The organization also provides access to equipment resources, such as cameras and editing facilities, as part of its operations.

911 Media also supports civic programs involving media literacy with the City of Seattle and greater King County, WA. It also partners with, and aids, other local non-profit organizations such as the Seattle Art Museum, Wing Luke Museum and the Museum of History and Industry.

== Artists and exhibitions ==
911 Seattle Media Arts Center has hosted and exhibited works by filmmakers and video artists since its founding.

In 1990, Guillermo Gómez-Peña was invited to perform at On The Boards in partnership with 911 Media. In 1994 the Northwest Cyber Artists partnered with 911 Media Arts Center to create an exhibit of interactive art at the Seattle Center House. Gary Hill has also exhibited at the center several times since its inception.

Among artists-in-residence is director James Longley, who edited the documentary Iraq in Fragments at the center working with producer John Sinno. The film was nominated for an Academy Award for the Best Documentary Feature. Other recent recipients of the centers artist-in-residence programs include Margot Knight, whose work has been featured internationally in magazines such as PHOTO France, EFX Art & Design, and Zoom.
