= Focke =

Focke may mean:

== Companies ==
- Focke-Wulf Flugzeugbau AG, a German manufacturer of civil and military aircraft during World War II
- Focke and Co, a worldwide manufacturer of packaging equipment and systems

== People ==
- Anne Daubenspeck-Focke (née Focke, born 1922), German sculptor and painter
- Gustav Woldmar Focke (1810-1877), German physician and naturalist
- Henrich Focke (1890-1979), German aviation pioneer, co-founder of the Focke-Wulf company
- Katharina Focke (1922–2016), German politician (SPD)
- Wilhelm Olbers Focke (1834–1922), German botanist

== Other uses ==
- The Focke-Wulf Fw 190 aircraft

== See also ==
- Fokker, a Dutch aircraft manufacturer
