= Jill Medvedow =

American museum director

Jill Medvedow is the former Ellen Matilda Poss Director of the Institute of Contemporary Art (ICA), Boston. She was appointed Director in 1998. Since then, Medvedow has led the ICA's transformation from a small, non-collecting institution into a major presence in the contemporary art world and on Boston's waterfront, in particular, by building the first new museum building in Boston in a century, increasing the museum's attendance tenfold. She stepped down from her position as Director at the end of March in 2025.

== Background ==
Jill Medvedow was raised in New Haven, Connecticut. She received a B.A. from Colgate University and a Masters of Arts from the Institute of Fine Arts, New York University. She founded the 911 Media Arts Center in Seattle, Washington, before moving to Boston and serving as the Deputy Director of the New England Foundation for the Arts, Program Director at WGBH, and the Deputy Director and Curator of Contemporary Art at the Isabella Stewart Gardner Museum. In 1997, Medvedow founded Vita Brevis, a public arts program that brought innovative contemporary works to a city known for its conservative taste in public art.

== ICA Director ==
Medvedow was appointed Director of the ICA in 1998. Her time as Director is most notable for the construction of a new ICA building on the Boston waterfront, which has established the ICA as a major cultural institution in Boston and facilitated an enormous growth in museum membership and attendance. Under Medvedow, the ICA took a chance on hiring architecture firm Diller Scofidio + Renfro to design the new museum, offering the now-prominent team their first commission for a building in the United States. The new ICA was the first museum built in Boston in a century and a catalyst for the development of Boston's waterfront. In Medvedow's time as ICA Director, annual attendance at the museum has increased from 25,000 to 280,000. Membership has increased sevenfold.

Under Medvedow, the ICA has also acquired a permanent collection for the first time. The ICA's teen programs, a focus of Medvedow's tenure, have been recognized by the White House as national models. During this period, the ICA has also continued to organize landmark contemporary art exhibitions. Medvedow has also led two major capital campaigns, raising funds to build the new ICA building and to create a meaningful endowment for the museum.

In 2018, under Medvedow’s leadership, the ICA opened the Watershed, transforming a 15,000-square-foot, former copper pipe and sheet metal factory in East Boston into a vast space for experiencing large-scale art, free of charge to all. The Watershed was closed to the public in 2020 due to the Covid-19 pandemic and the site was used to distribute boxes of food and art kits to the East Boston community from April 2020 through December 2021, serving approximately 50,000 people.

Medvedow served as co-commissioner of the Venice Biennale in 2022 with the historic selection of Simone Leigh, the first Black American woman to represent the U.S. at the Biennale, the world’s most prestigious contemporary art exhibition.

== Awards, honors, and civic service ==
Medvedow served as chair of Massachusetts Governor Deval Patrick's Working Group on the Creative Economy and was a member of Boston Mayor Marty Walsh's Economic Development Transition Team. Her tenure at the ICA is the subject of an MIT Sloan School of Management Case Study on Leadership and Risk. Medvedow serves on the Board of Boston After School and Beyond. In 2006, the Boston Globe named Medvedow one of its People of the Year, naming her "The Visionary." Medvedow was elected to the American Academy of Arts and Sciences in 2022.
