= Institute of Contemporary Art, Boston =

Art museum in Boston, Massachusetts, US

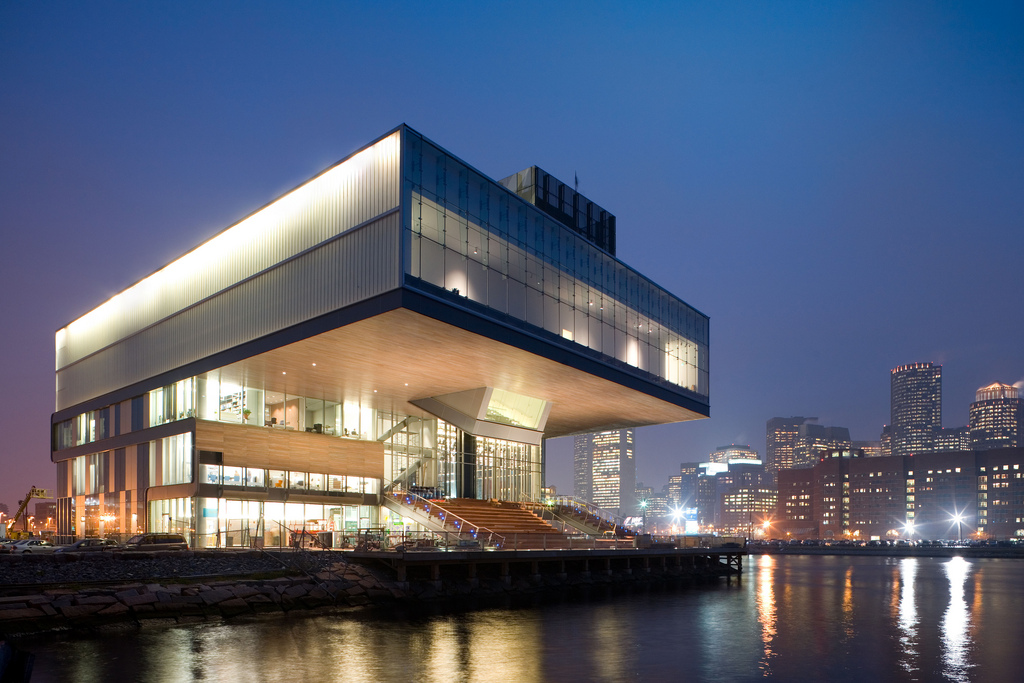
- The ICA's current building in South Boston
- Former name: Boston Museum of Modern Art
- Established: 1936
- Location: 25 Harbor Shore Drive, Boston, MA 02210
- Coordinates: 42.352843°N 71.042857°W
- Type: Art museum
- Accreditation: American Alliance of Museums
- Director: Jill Medvedow
- Architect: Diller Scofidio + Renfro
- Public transit access: Silver Line (SL1, SL2, or SL3) Courthouse Station
- Website: icaboston.org

The Institute of Contemporary Art (ICA) is an art museum and exhibition space located in Boston, Massachusetts, United States. The museum was founded as the Boston Museum of Modern Art in 1936. Since then it has gone through multiple name changes as well as moving its galleries and support spaces over 13 times. Its current home was built in 2006 in the South Boston Seaport District and designed by architects Diller Scofidio + Renfro.

== History ==
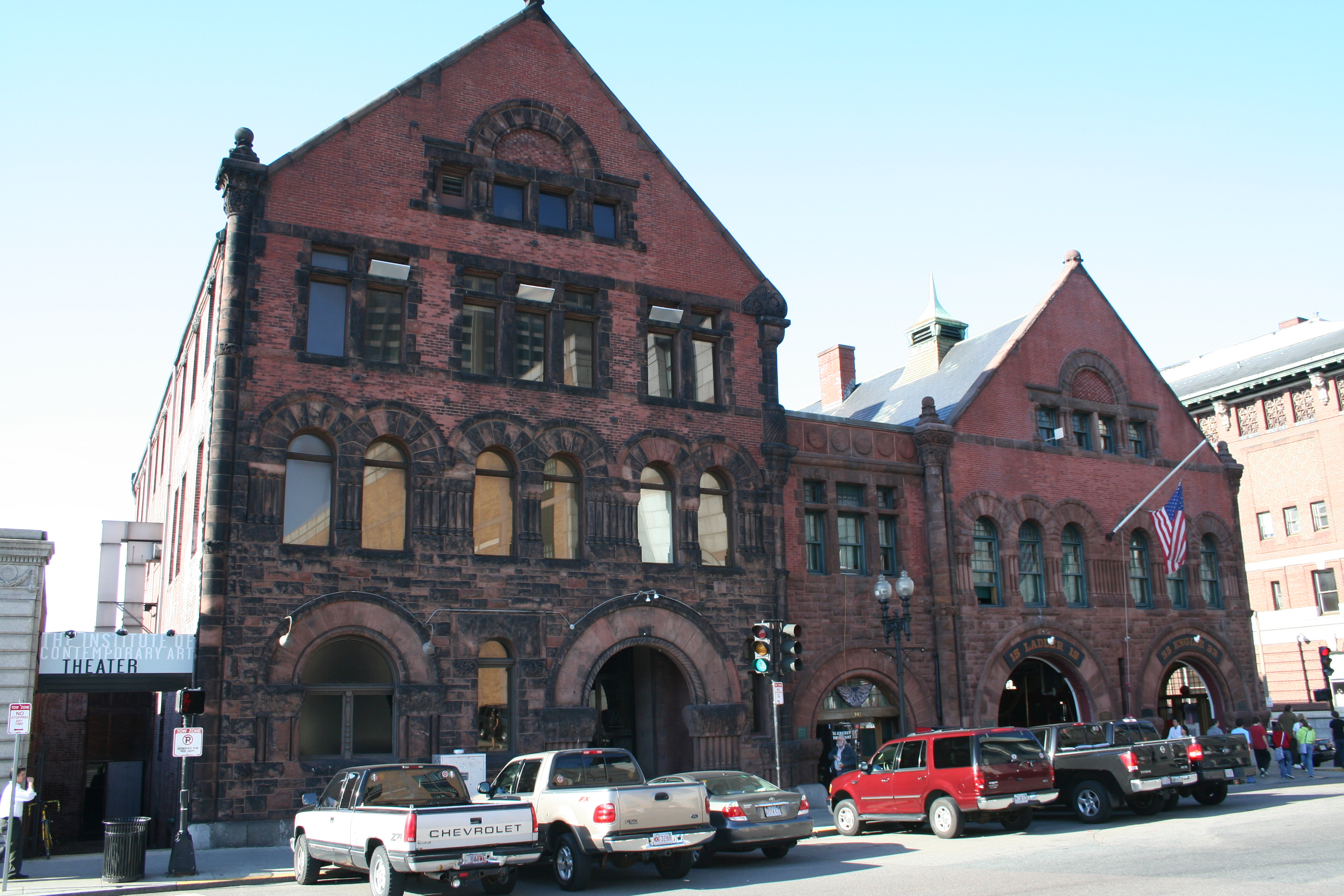
The former ICA building located at 951/955 Boylston Street, now occupied by the Boston Architectural College

The Institute of Contemporary Art was founded as the Boston Museum of Modern Art in 1936 with offices rented at 114 State Street with gallery space provided by the Fogg Museum and the Busch–Reisinger Museum at Harvard University. The Museum planned itself as "a renegade offspring of the Museum of Modern Art", and was led by its first president, a 26-year-old architect named Nathaniel Saltonstall. The first exhibit curated by the new museum was "the first survey show of Paul Gauguin in the Boston Area." Also in this first year the institution's first fundraiser was held, the Modern Art Ball, to which many big names in the art world attended including Gala and Salvador Dalí who entered the ball dressed as sharks.

In 1937 the Boston Museum of Modern Art moved to its first self-administered gallery space located at 14 Newbury Street and instated a 25 cent admission charge. This year the museum displayed the first survey of dada and surrealist art. On exhibit during this show was the now famous work Object (Le Déjeuner en fourrure) by Méret Oppenheim. This exhibit was followed in 1938 by the museum sponsoring the Ballet Russe de Monte-Carlo's United States premiere. The performance had set pieces and costumes designed by Henri Matisse which was in keeping with the current exhibit, an examination of the relationship between Matisse and Pablo Picasso. The museum also moved again, this time to the Boston Art Club at 270 Dartmouth Street.

In 1939 the museum officially cut ties with the Museum of Modern Art and changed its name to the "Institute of Modern Art." After changing its name the museum held a show of German degenerate art, labeled as such by Hitler himself. Artists included in the exhibit included Max Beckmann, Ernst Ludwig Kirchner, Emil Nolde, and Paul Klee. The museum hosted a traveling exhibition of Pablo Picasso's works in 1940 named "Picasso, Forty Years of His Art", which included Picasso's famous work Guernica. The museum moved for a third time in as many years in 1940 to 210 Beacon Street and put together Frank Lloyd Wright's first museum survey in the United States. The museum stayed on Beacon Street until 1943 when it moved to 138 Newbury Street and assembled the first African American artist survey in New England, including works by Romare Bearden and Jacob Lawrence among others. The museum was also an important venue for the Boston Expressionists.

In 1948 the "Institute of Modern Art" changes its name once again to the "Institute of Contemporary Art" (ICA) to "[distance] itself from the ideological inflections the term 'modern' has accrued in favor of its original meaning: 'that which exists now.'" This same year the newly renamed ICA exhibits works by Le Corbusier in his first show in a United States museum.

For the next several years the ICA exhibited many touring and self-curated shows, including a 1950 survey of Edvard Munch including his famous work The Scream, a 1952 survey of Wassily Kandinsky including works never seen in the United States, and the first retrospective of Milton Avery in 1953. In 1956 the museum moved once more, this time to the School of the Museum of Fine Arts at 230 The Fenway, where in 1958 it organized the first United States museum survey of Roberto Matta. In 1959 the ICA installed artwork on the interior of a Stop & Shop on Memorial Drive in a show titled "Young Talent in New England." Some claim that the show anticipated the pop art movement and its interest in consumerism.

1960 saw the ICA moving to the Metropolitan Boston Arts Center, located at 1175 Soldiers Field Road, which was designed by the museums founder, Nathaniel Saltonstall. The newly built, modernist glass-enclosed gallery was 80 feet long and 33 feet wide and was raised 12 feet off the ground on steel supports. The ICA only inhabited this space until 1963 where it moved, this time to 100 Newbury Street. During the five years the ICA spent at this location the museum exhibited, among other things, a collection of works by artists representing the United States at the Venice Biennale (John Chamberlain, Jim Dine, Jasper Johns, Morris Louis, Kenneth Noland, Claes Oldenburg, Robert Rauschenberg, and Frank Stella) and in 1965 the museum housed an exhibit on video and electronic art called "Art Turned On" to which Marcel Duchamp attended.

In 1966 the museum organized an Andy Warhol exhibition with roughly 40 works including selections from Campbell's Soup Cans and portraits of Jackie Kennedy, Marilyn Monroe, Elvis Presley, and Elizabeth Taylor, as well as the first exhibitions in a museum setting of Warhol's films including Eat, Sleep, and Kiss. This same year saw Warhol and The Velvet Underground stage a performance of Exploding Plastic Inevitable at the ICA.

1968 saw the ICA return to the Metropolitan Boston Arts Center, at 1175 Soldiers Field Road, for two years just to move again in 1970 to the Parkman House at 33 Beacon Street as a temporary home. During these two years the ICA held an exhibit called "Monumental Sculpture for Public Spaces" where large-scale sculptural works by well-known artists, such as Alexander Calder, Donald Judd, Robert Morris, Louise Nevelson, Claes Oldenburg, and Mark di Suvero, were placed in public spaces across the city. Possibly the most notable sculpture from this exhibit was the installation of the original 12 foot tall Cor-ten steel edition of Robert Indiana's LOVE on City Hall Plaza

In 1972 the ICA installed the first Douglas Huebler solo show, and it briefly moved to 137 Newbury Street. A year later, in 1973, the ICA found a more permanent home at 955 Boylston Street in a former police station. The Museum occupied this building for 33 years over which many exhibits and performances were mounted. Highlights from the first decade of the ICA at this location include a 1976 retrospective of Claes Oldenburg in which Oldenberg himself attends, the first showing of David Hockney artworks in America in 1977, and in 1980 the museum hosted both the first United States museum exhibition of purely Dada artworks as well as a roller disco fundraiser.

The 1980s saw more exhibitions including the first museum installation of works by Francesco Clemente and Anselm Kiefer in 1982, and in 1984 the ICA joined with WGBH, Boston's PBS station, to create and fund the Contemporary Art Television Fund. This fund helped video artists get their works to be broadcast on television. Later in decade the ICA exhibited works by Allan Sekula in his first museum solo show in 1986, held the New England Premiere of the film True Stories by David Byrne, in 1986, who attended the screening, and in 1989 displayed both the first United States survey for Chris Burden as well as the first dedicated major exhibition of the Situationist International movement.

In 1990 the ICA was the last stop for the traveling highly controversial exhibit The Perfect Moment containing the works of Robert Mapplethorpe, as well as displaying the first museum exhibition in the United States of works by Sophie Calle. In 1997 Cildo Meireles received his first exhibition in a major United States museum at the ICA.

The late 1990s saw a dramatic shift at the ICA. A new director, Jill Medvedow, was hired and she embarked upon a new series called "Vita Brevis" which was a series of commissions of large-scale artworks to be exhibited in public spaces across Boston. One of the first works commissioned for this project was a film projected on the Bunker Hill Monument created by Krzysztof Wodiczko. These works greatly increased the public knowledge and image of the museum. Then, in 1999 the ICA won a competition to build a new cultural institution building on Boston's Fan Pier.

While plans for the new building on the waterfront were being created and the building itself constructed, the ICA continued to be located at 955 Boylston Street. During these years the ICA exhibited, among other things, the first solo exhibition in a museum of works by Cornelia Parker in 2000 and the first United States solo exhibit for Olafur Eliasson in 2001.

In 2006 the ICA moved to its new 65,000 square foot building on Fan Pier containing both galleries and a performance space. This same year, the museum began to build a permanent collection. Since moving to its new building, the ICA has presented world premiers of dance performances by the Mark Morris Dance Group in 2007 and the Bill T. Jones/Arnie Zane Dance Company in 2011. Exhibits have included the first major museum surveys of works by Tara Donovan in 2008, Damián Ortega and Shepard Fairey, who was arrested on vandalism charges on his way to an ICA event, in 2009, and Mark Bradford in 2010.

== Buildings ==
=== Main building ===
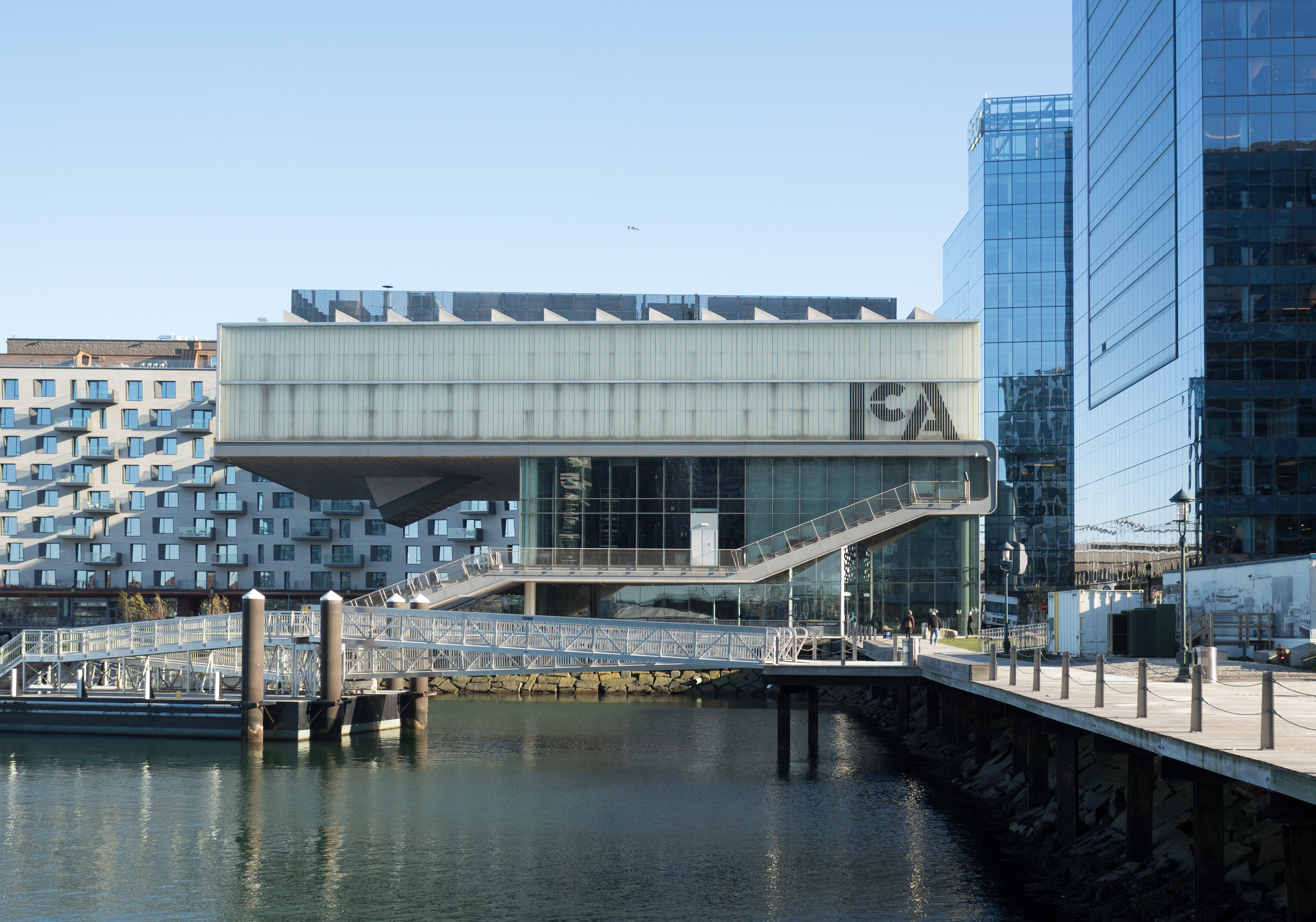
ICA building in 2019

Formerly located on Boylston Street in the Back Bay neighborhood, the ICA moved to a new facility in the Seaport District of South Boston. The museum celebrated the completion of its new building the weekend of December 9–10, 2006. The new building coincided with the museum's launch of its first permanent collection.

The new building was designed by the architectural firm Diller Scofidio + Renfro. It is one of that firm's first structures to be built, and the first to be built in the United States. It is also the first new art museum to be built in Boston in over a century.

The building is located between the Courthouse and World Trade Center stations on the MBTA Silver Line.

The building's design, which echoes that of nearby waterfront gantry cranes, has been celebrated by many critics for its openness, represented by its exterior grand staircase, and willingness to embrace the surrounding harbor. The ICA was the recipient of the 2007 Harleston Parker Medal, awarded to "the most beautiful piece of architecture" in Boston. It has also been called a "botched box" by architecture critic Philip Nobel, who criticised it for having poor circulation, a dull façade facing land, and casting into shadow the harborside promenade that Elizabeth Diller once referred to as "Boston's only viable civic space."

=== ICA Watershed ===
In 2018, the ICA transformed a condemned 15,000-square-foot building in the Boston Harbor Shipyard and Marina in East Boston into the "ICA Watershed". The renovation was designed by Alex Anmahian and Nick Winton.

Admission to the Watershed is free. The ICA offers ferry service from its main building to the Watershed, which is open each year from spring through fall.

Each year, an exhibit by one artist fills the space. The 2018 exhibit was by Diana Thater, and the 2019 exhibit was by John Akomfrah. The planned opening of the 2020 exhibit by Firelei Báez was delayed by the ICA's closure, due to the COVID-19 pandemic. With the museum closed because of the pandemic, the building was used as a staging area for delivery of food to East Boston residents. Báez's work was presented in the following 2021 season instead. The 2022 exhibit was entitled "Revival: Materials and Monumental Forms" and featured works by six artists working in the shared theme of reclaimed materials. The space returned to presenting works by a singular artist in 2023, with sculptures by Guadalupe Maravilla. The 2024-2025 seasons saw installations by Hew Locke (The Procession) and Chiharu Shiota ("Home Less Home"), respectively. As of Spring 2026, the space is set to open in May with kinetic and film works by Lucy Raven.

== Exhibitions ==
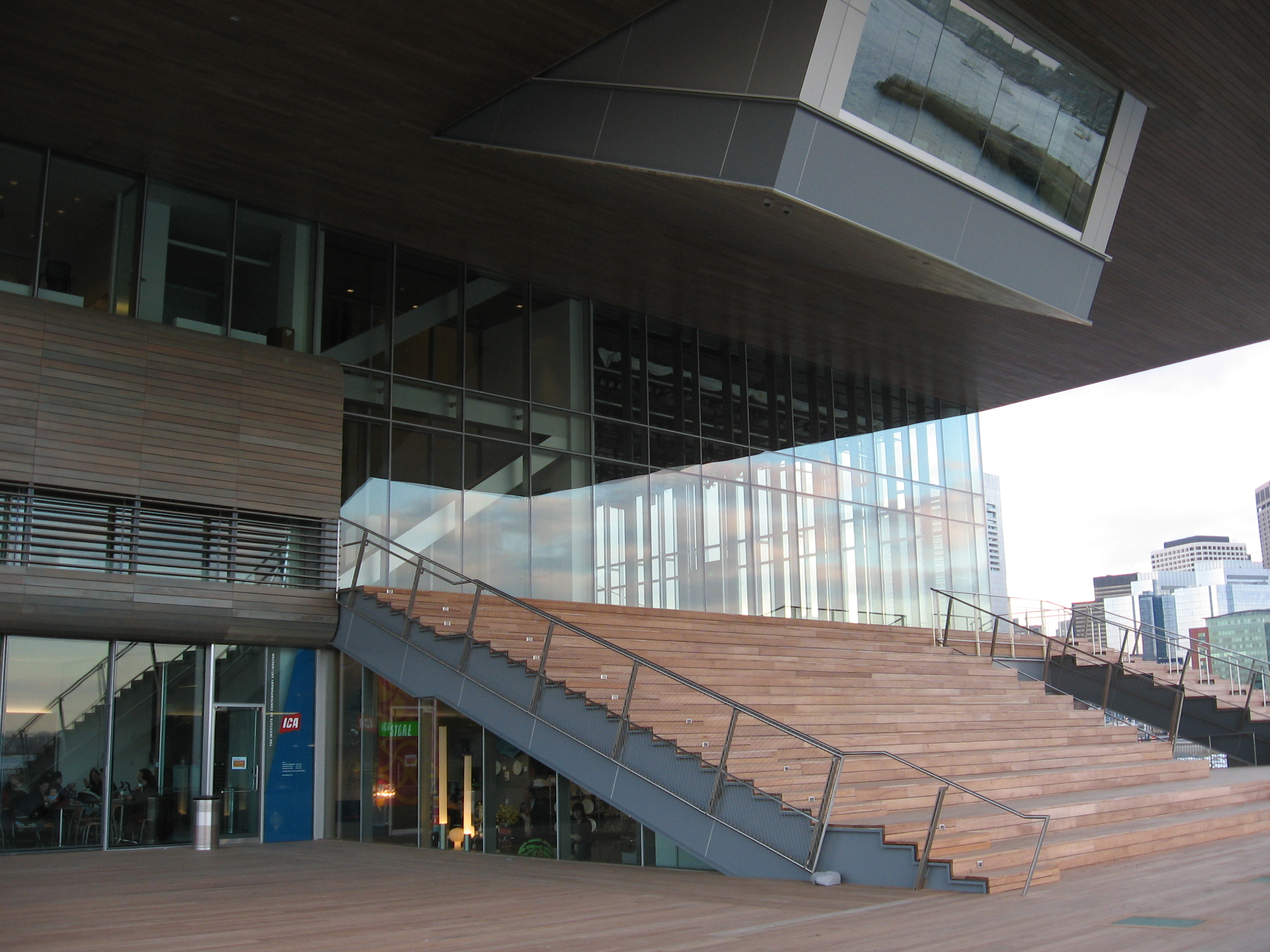
Outdoor amphitheater facing Boston Harbor

The ICA's exhibition program has included the Momentum series, focusing on the work of emerging artists; the Sandra and Gerald Fineberg Art Wall, an annual, site-specific commission in the museum lobby; the James and Audrey Foster Prize, a biennial exhibition and award for Boston-area artists; and selections from the permanent collection. The West Gallery (known today as Bridgitt and Bruce Evans Family and Karen and Brian Conway Galleries), the largest exhibition space, has featured solo and group exhibitions. Highlights include:

- Super Vision (2006)
- Philip-Lorca diCorcia (2007)
- Street Level (2008)
- Anish Kapoor (2008)
- Tara Donovan (2008)
- Shepard Fairey (2009)
- Mark Bradford (2011)
- Liz Deschenes (2016)
- Mark Dion: Misadventures of a 21st-Century Naturalist (2017)
- William Forsythe: Choreographic Objects (2018-2019)
- Yayoi Kusama: LOVE IS CALLING (2019-2020)
- Virgil Abloh: “Figures of Speech” (2021)
- Simone Leigh (2023)
- Derrick Adams: View Master (2026)

== Management ==
=== Directors ===
- 1998–2024: Jill Medvedow
- 2025–present: Nora Burnett Abrams

=== Chief curators ===
- 2010–2014: Helen Molesworth
- 2015–2023: Eva Respini
- 2023–present: Ruth Erickson
