= And/or alternative space =

Art gallery in Seattle, Washington, US

Coordinates: 47.6151065°N 122.3201698°W

The and/or alternative space was an exhibition, project, and performance space founded by Anne Focke in Seattle, Washington. The first alternative art exhibition and performance space in the Pacific Northwest, and/or was located at 1523 Tenth Avenue in Capitol Hill, and included an art library, a video editing and viewing facility, and an electronic music facility.

== History ==
and/or was organized by Anne Focke in 1974 to provide an alternative space for performances, exhibitions, and other experimental art forms that could not be seen otherwise. Its founding group included Focke, Norie Sato, David Mahler, Burt Garner, and Annie Grosshans. In 1981, the space evolved into an umbrella organization with four programs: the NX Library, a center for contemporary arts materials with a focus on periodicals; Soundwork, a composer-oriented new music organization; the Philo T. Farnsworth Memorial Video Editing Facility for artists and independent producers; and Spar, an arts magazine which collapsed soon afterward.

In October 1984, and/or was discontinued by its board of directors, who spun off its programs into four independent organizations: Artech, an art handling company; Artist Trust, a funding organization for artists; Center on Contemporary Art (CoCA) an exhibition venue; and the 911 Media Arts Center supporting new-media production and education. At its height in the late 1970s and/or was one of the major arts organizations in the Pacific Northwest with strong local and NEA funding and an national reputation for hosting top international artists, including Nam June Paik, George Maciunas, Meridith Monk, Laurie Anderson, Gary Hill, Martha Rosler, and Stuart Dempster, seeding a generation of contemporary artists in late-twentieth-century Seattle.
