= Anne Daubenspeck-Focke =

German sculptor and painter (1922–2021)

Anne Daubenspeck-Focke (née Focke, 18 April 1922 – 27 January 2021) was a German sculptor and painter.

== Biography ==
Anne Focke was born in Metelen in April 1922 as the daughter of Andreas Focke and Elisabeth Wensing, but grew up in Emsdetten. Already in her youth Focke was active as a sculptor. In 1942 she took evening classes at the art school in Münster and between 1943 and 1944 she studied Christian art in Heek-Nienborg with Wilhelm Felix Schlüter. From 1948 Focke worked and learned in the workshop of Heinrich Lückenkötter in Oelde. Finally she studied with Kurt Schwippert at the Werkkunstschule Münster from 1949 to 1954.

In 1954 Focke married the sculptor Herbert Daubenspeck from Emsdetten. The couple had a son and two daughters. Due to family reasons she was not able to do much artistic work in the following years. From 1965 she was able to devote more time to her artistic activities again; she created numerous drawings, portraits and small sculptures. In 1985 she designed her first life-size bronze sculpture for the Kreislehrgarten in Steinfurt with Der Leser (the reader). From 1985 Daubenspeck-Focke created various life-size bronze sculptures for municipal and private clients.

Since 1954 she has created Christmas cribs for churches. Daubenspeck-Focke has been represented in more than 40 solo and group exhibitions in Germany, the Netherlands, Great Britain and the European Parliament in Strasbourg and several other countries.

In 1970 the couple was one of the co-founders of the artists' association Welbergener Kreis.

Daubenspeck-Focke died in January 2021 at the age of 98.

== Gallery ==
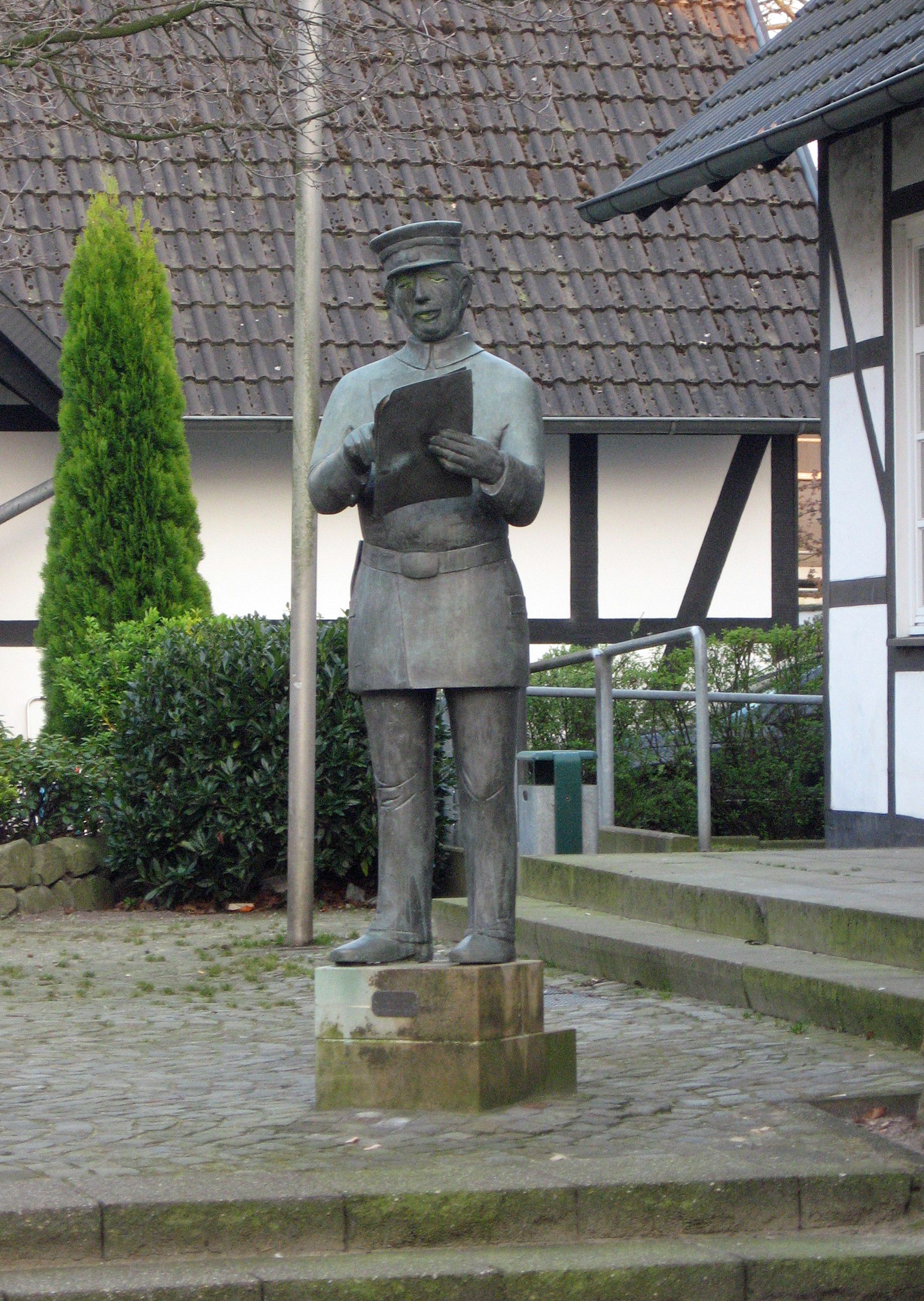
Afrouper (community messenger), Ladbergen

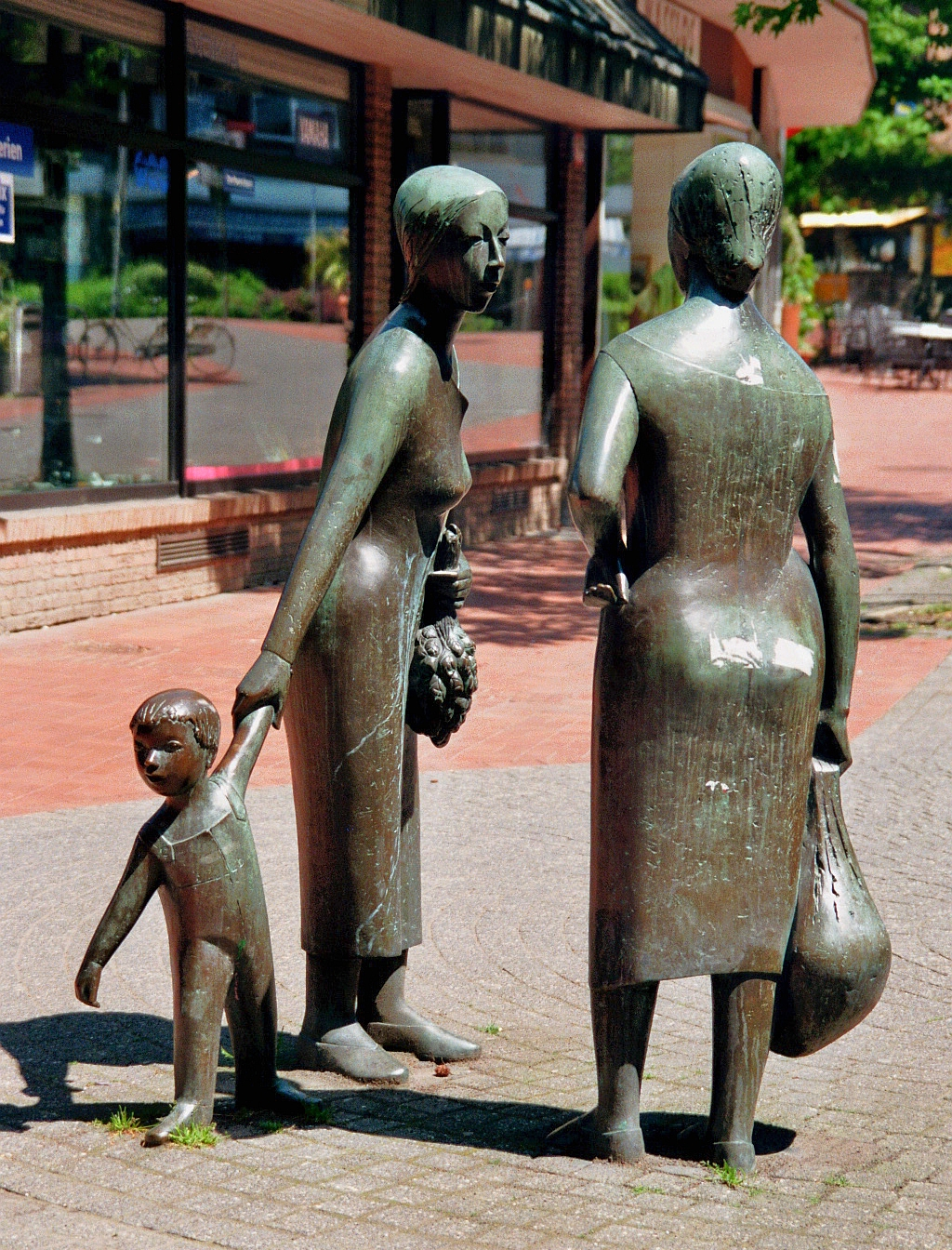
Vom Wochenmarkt kommend (Coming from the weekly market)

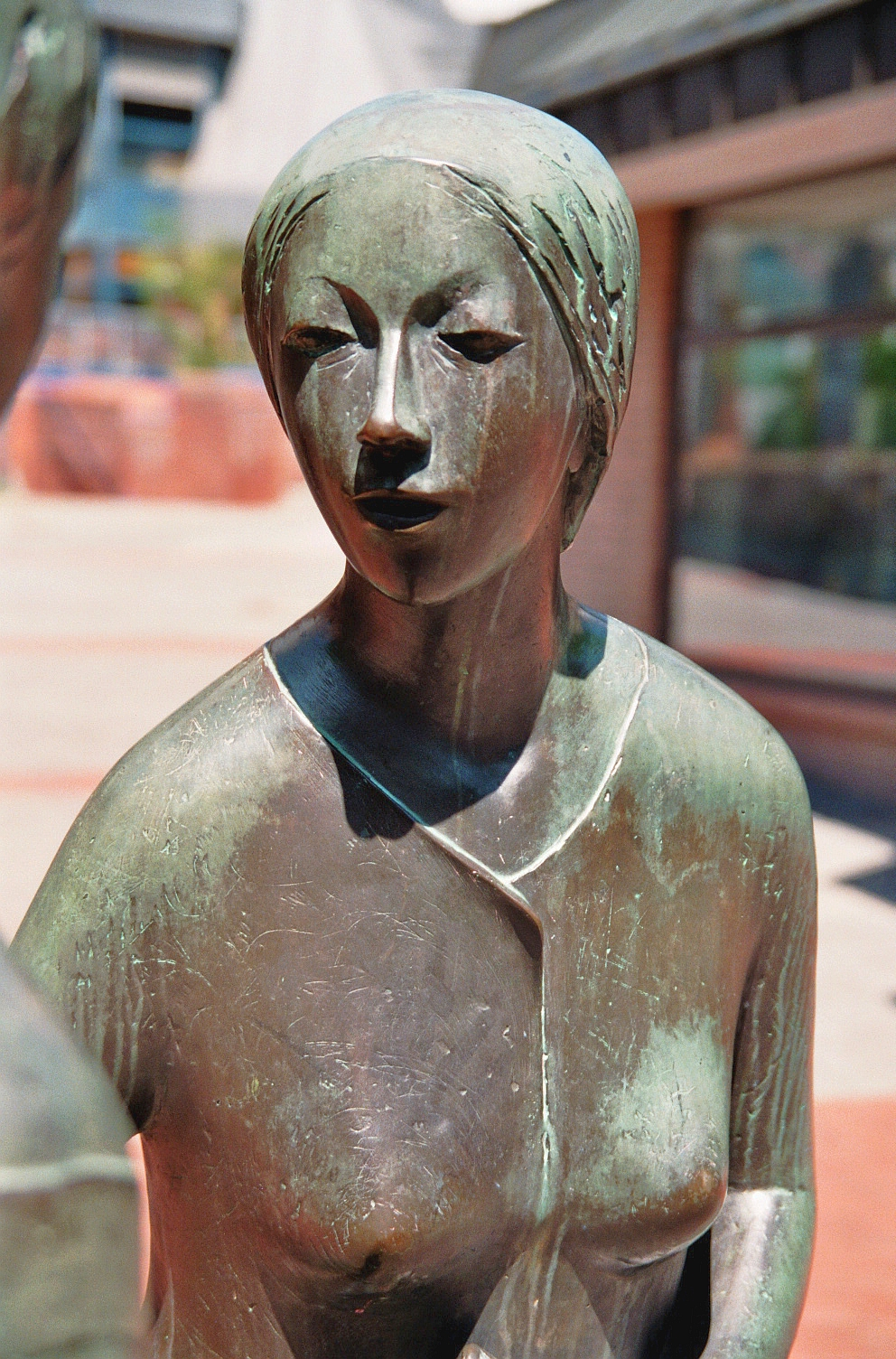
Coming from the weekly market – detail

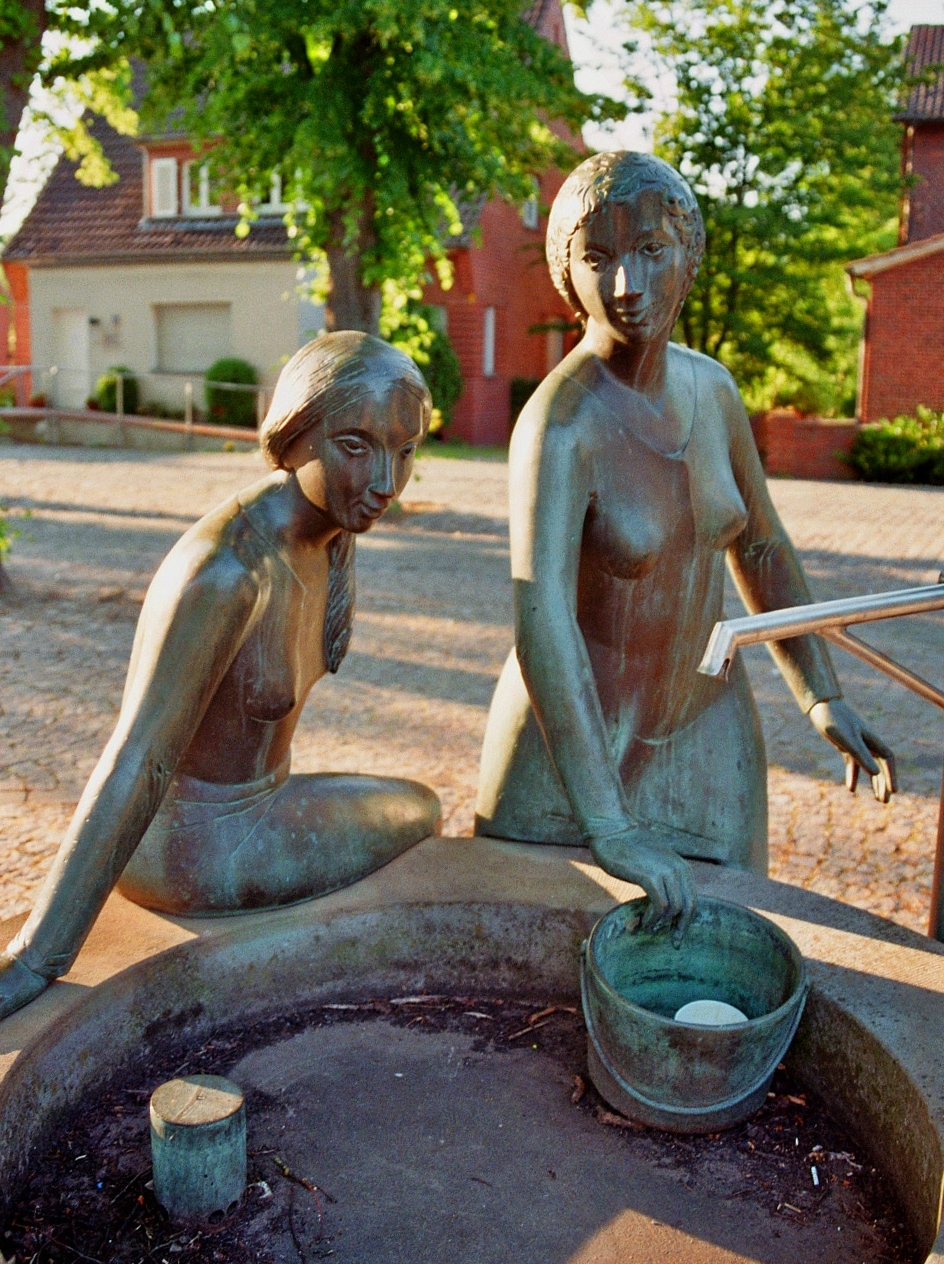
Brunnengeflüster (Fountain whispering), Saerbeck

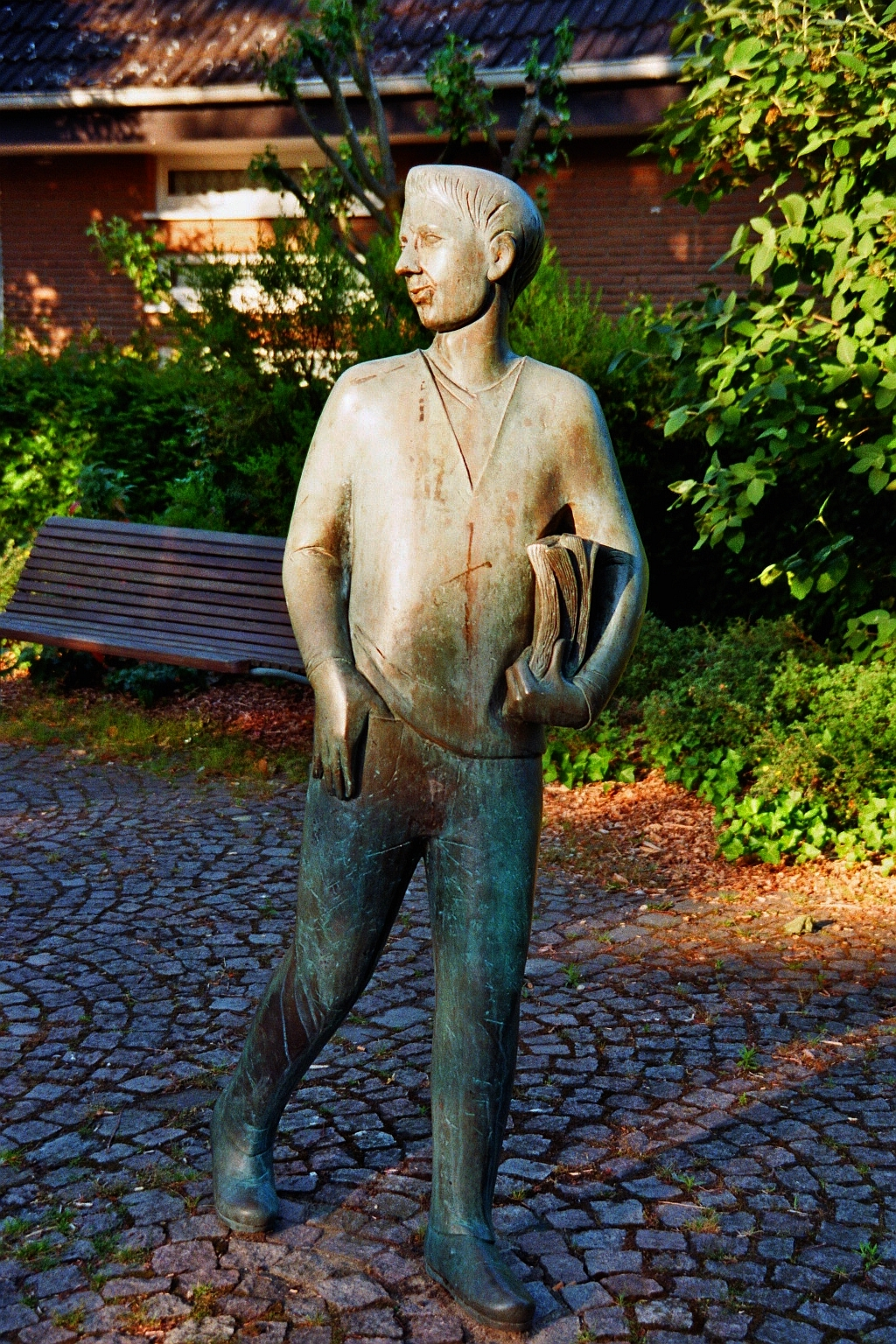
Fountain whispering

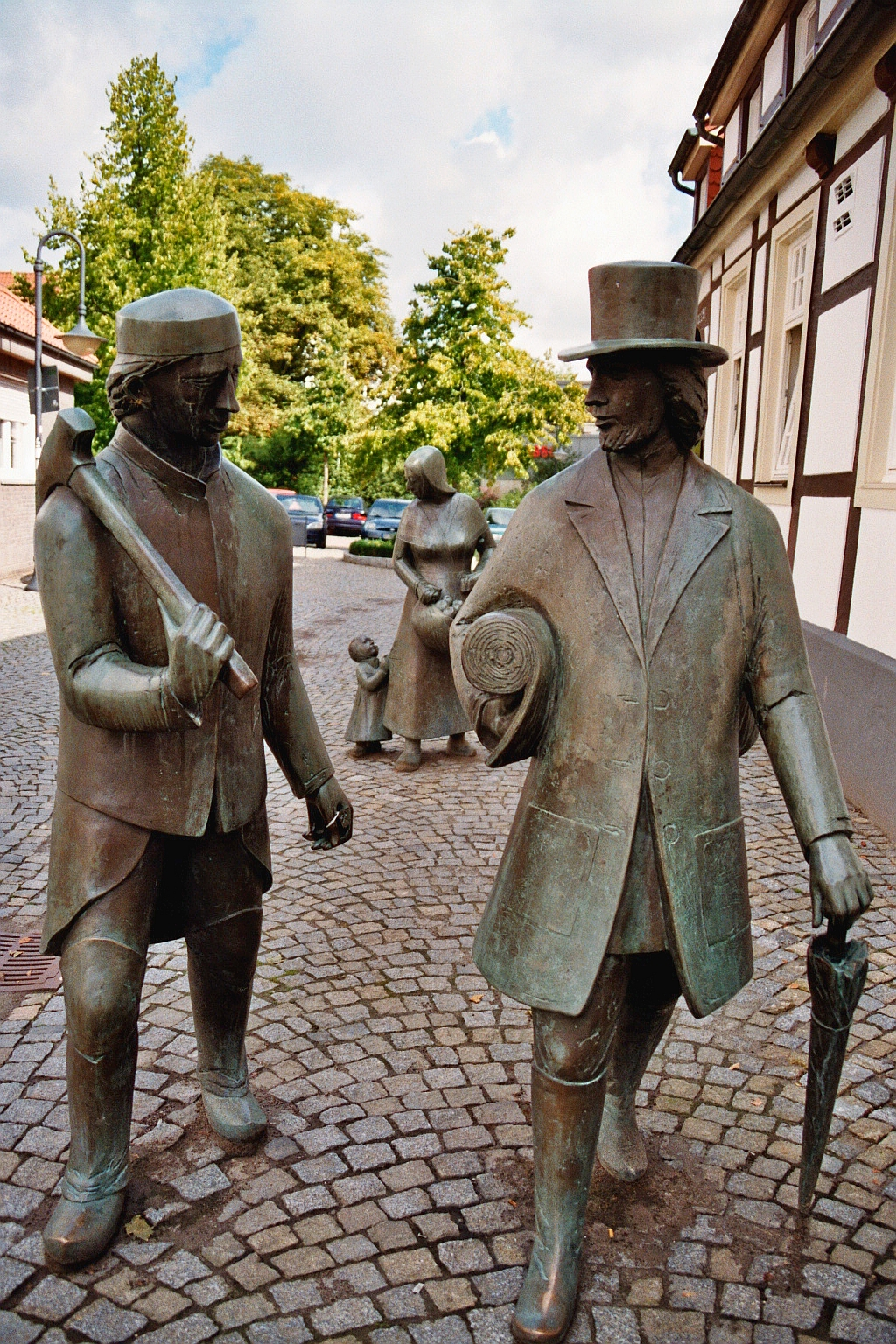
Bergmann, Tüötte und Bäuerin mit Kind (Miner, tüötte and peasant woman with child, Mettingen
