= Center on Contemporary Art =

Arts organization based in Seattle, Washington

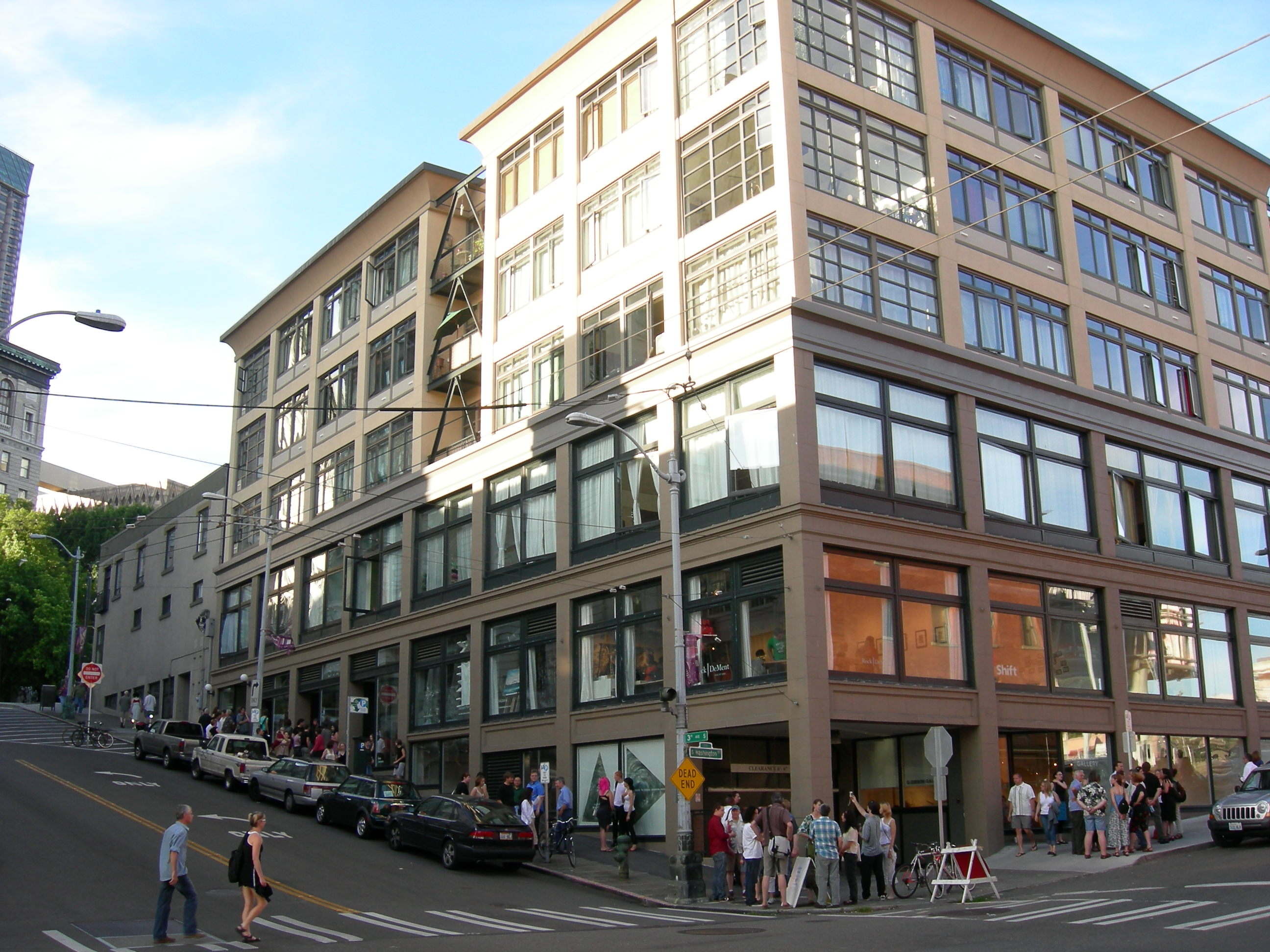
- The CoCA gallery is located in the Tashiro Kaplan Building in Seattle's historic Pioneer Square as of September 2016.
- Established: 1980
- Location: Seattle, Washington
- Type: Non-profit art institution
- Website: cocaseattle.org

The Center on Contemporary Art (CoCA) is a non-profit arts organization located in Seattle, Washington. CoCA was founded in 1980 by a group of artists, art patrons, and arts activists. Since its inaugural exhibition (James Turrell's "Four Light Installations", 1982, at the Lippy Building in Pioneer Square), CoCA has provided continuous programming that presents work by both established and emerging artists. CoCA originally existed without a permanent gallery space, and the organization has since inhabited numerous locations in Seattle. Its most recent location, as of September 2016, is the Tashiro Kaplan Building in historic Pioneer Square. Today, CoCA serves the community through exhibitions, artist residencies, publications, and discussions.

== Operations ==
Members, staff, donors and volunteers work to exhibit international, national and local artists in a gallery setting, create events and host annual programs.

CoCA is a tax-exempt non-profit run by a working Board of Directors.

CoCA launched their Archives Project in 2013 as a way to preserve, catalog and share the printed materials, slides, video and other materials gathered over the organization's history.

== Exhibitions ==
Annual programs have included the Northwest Annual, the 24-Hour Painting Marathon and Auction, and the Annual Members' Show. The Northwest Annual was originally under the Seattle Art Museum until CoCA took over the program from 1989 through 2014. The group exhibition showcased current work by local artists of various mediums selected by a juror. Past Northwest Annual jurors include visual artists Leon Golub and Nancy Spero in 1989, painter and sculptor Kerry James Marshall in 1999, and Canadian visual artist Ken Lum in 2004. At the 24-Hour Painting Marathon & Auction, originally titled "They Shoot Painters, Don't They?", CoCA invites artists to create work in one day, then auctions the artworks. CoCA also founded and produced Heaven & Earth, a group show of outdoor, temporary installations in Carkeek Park inaugurated in 2009 until the exhibit went independent in 2015.

== See also ==
- Contemporary art
