= Philip Nobel =

American architect

- Writing career
- Genre: Non-fiction
- Subject: Architecture

Philip Nobel is an architect, architectural critic, and author who has written about architecture at the New York Times, Curbed, Metropolis, Artforum, Architectural Digest and other publications. He discussed disposable diaper design on Public Radio International. He lives in Brooklyn and is divorced with children.

A Kirkus Reviews writeup described his book Sixteen Acres about redevelopment efforts at the World Trade Center site known as Ground Zero as "unsparingly showing New York City’s power brokers taking a nation-bending hole in the ground and mixing into it a witch’s brew of ego, politics, greed, and amnesia".

Nobel has stated that protest and organizing have moved online. He stated malls are becoming a place of civic engagement and training grounds for future urbanism.

== Bibliography ==
- Sixteen Acres : Architecture and the Outrageous Struggle for the Future of Ground Zero (2005), about the redevelopment of Ground Zero, the site of the World Trade Center
- New New York (2011), essay accompanying photographs by Jake Rajs.
- The Future of the Skyscraper : SOM Thinkers Series, 2015 Edition, one of several authors
- SHoP, introduction
